= 1994 Kyrgyz presidential referendum =

| 30 January 1994 |
- Do you confirm that the President of Kyrgyzstan who was democratically elected on 12 October 1991 for 5 years is the President of the Kyrgyz Republic with the right to act as head of state during his term of office?

Results
| Choice | Votes | % |
|---|---|---|
| Yes | 2,095,644 | 97.03% |
| No | 64,256 | 2.97% |
| Valid votes | 2,159,900 | 99.30% |
| Invalid or blank votes | 15,295 | 0.70% |
| Total votes | 2,175,195 | 100.00% |
| Registered voters/turnout | 2,267,163 | 95.94% |

A referendum on President Askar Akayev was held in Kyrgyzstan on 30 January 1994. Voters were asked "Do you confirm that the President of Kyrgyzstan who was democratically elected on 12 October 1991 for 5 years is the President of the Kyrgyz Republic with the right to act as head of state during his term in office?" The result was 97% in favour, with turnout reported to be 96%.

== Results ==
| Choice | Votes | % |
|---|---|---|
| For | 2,095,644 | 97.03 |
| Against | 64,256 | 2.97 |
| Total | 2,159,900 | 100.00 |
| Valid votes | 2,159,900 | 99.30 |
| Invalid/blank votes | 15,295 | 0.70 |
| Total votes | 2,175,195 | 100.00 |
| Registered voters/turnout | 2,267,163 | 95.94 |
Source: Nohlen et al.
