= 2000 Kyrgyz presidential election =

- 29 October 2000
- Registered: 2,501,102
- Turnout: 78.40% (▼7.79pp)
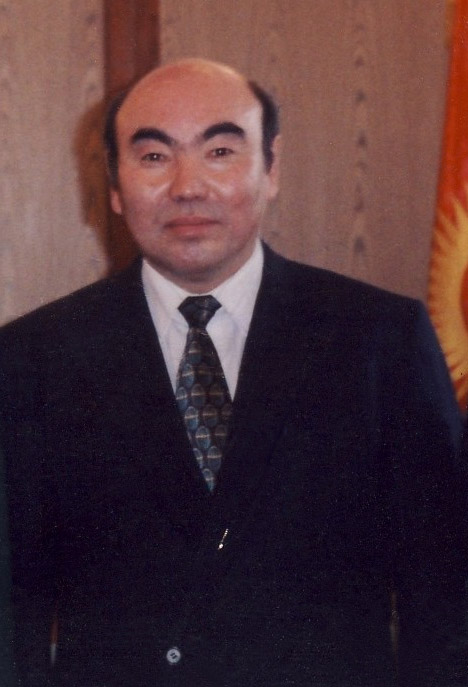

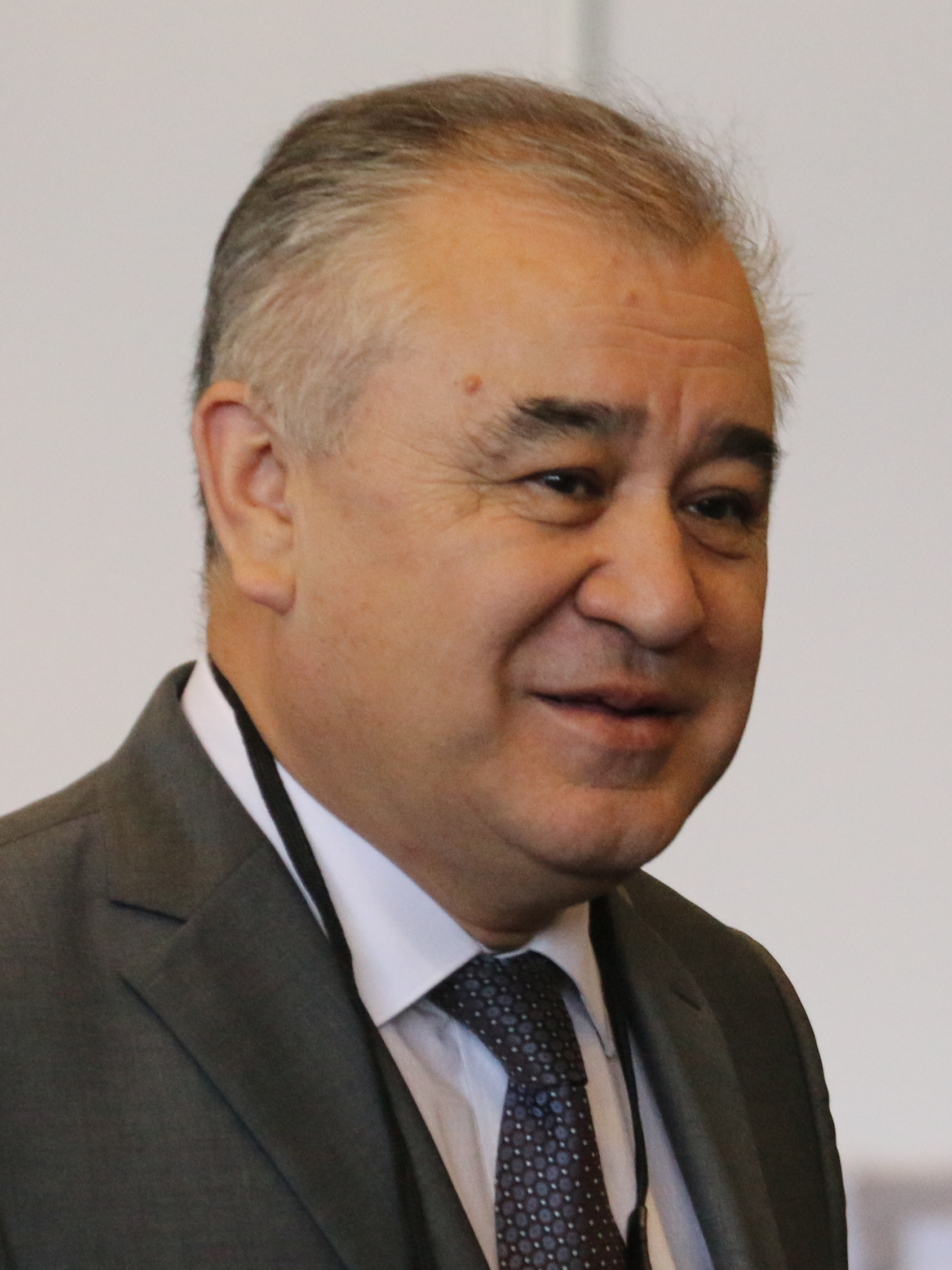

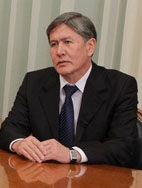
Nominee	Askar Akayev	Omurbek Tekebayev	Almazbek Atambayev
Party	Independent	Ata-Meken	SDPK
Popular vote	1,460,201	272,427	117,658
Percentage	76.36%	14.25%	6.15%
- Results by region
President before election
Askar Akayev
Independent
Elected President
Askar Akayev
Independent

Presidential elections were held in Kyrgyzstan on 29 October 2000. The result was a victory for incumbent President Askar Akayev, who was re-elected with 76% of the vote. International election monitors described the vote as failing to meet international standards. Voter turnout was 78%.

== Background ==
Askar Akayev was the incumbent president. He had first been elected as President of the Kirghiz Soviet Socialist Republic in October 1990, as a dark horse candidate. When Kyrgyzstan declared its independence from the Soviet Union in 1991, Akayev was elected president without opposition. His first term was set to expire in 1995, and his attempt to extend his term until 2002 was rejected by the Kyrgyz Parliament. Despite this, he was re-elected in 1995, in an election where three of his five opponents were disqualified by the Supreme Court of Kyrgyzstan. Akayev was granted eligibility for the 2000 election, despite the Kyrgyz constitution limiting presidents to serving two terms. The Supreme Court ruled that his first term did not count against the term limits because it started before the constitution was ratified.

Parliamentary elections were held in February and March 2000. Election observers from the Organization for Security and Co-operation in Europe (OSCE) noted concerns about the parliamentary elections, especially in the pre-election period. These included governmental interference against opposition parties and pro-government biases in the state media. The OSCE found that the parliamentary elections did not meet their standards for a free and fair election, and expressed concerns and potential improvements ahead of the presidential election.

Despite protests after the parliamentary elections that culminated with roundtable discussions between the government and opposition, these concerns were only partially addressed ahead of the presidential elections.

== Electoral system ==
The electoral system required an absolute majority (50%+1) for a candidate to be elected, with a run-off between the top two vote-getters if no candidate reached the 50% threshold. Candidates needed 50,000 signatures, spread across all regions of Kyrgyzstan, to qualify for the ballot. The winner was elected for a five-year term, ending in 2005.

== Campaign ==
Major issues in the election included an economic downturn, corruption, concerns about safety in the Fergana Valley. Opposition candidates generally pushed for political reforms that would weaken the president's power compared to the parliament's, with some proposing constitutional amendments to achieve this goal.

Three opposition candidates were excluded from the election due to criminal prosecutions after they announced their intentions to run for the presidency. Five opposition candidates were approved by the Central Election Commission to stand in the election.

== Conduct ==
Election observers noted vote counting discrepancies in multiple locations. These included implausibly high turnout numbers, inconsistencies between local vote counts and the reported counts from the electoral commission, and evidence of ballot stuffing.

== Results ==
The incumbent president, Askar Akayev, was re-elected with 76% of the vote, with a turnout of 78%. He received a majority of the vote in all eight regions of the country. The leading opposition candidate was MP Omurbek Tekebayev, who received 14% of the vote.

Candidate	Party	Votes	%
Askar Akayev	Independent	1,460,201	76.36
Omurbek Tekebayev	Ata Meken Socialist Party	272,427	14.25
Almazbek Atambayev	Social Democratic Party	117,658	6.15
Melis Eshimkanov	People's Party	21,260	1.11
Tursunbai Bakir Uulu	Free Kyrgyzstan Party	18,774	0.98
Tursunbek Akunov	Human Rights Movement	8,557	0.45
Against all		13,291	0.70
Total		1,912,168	100.00
Valid votes		1,912,168	97.52
Invalid/blank votes		48,679	2.48
Total votes		1,960,847	100.00
Registered voters/turnout		2,501,102	78.40
Source: Eschment & Grotz
