= List of Turkic Speaking States summits =

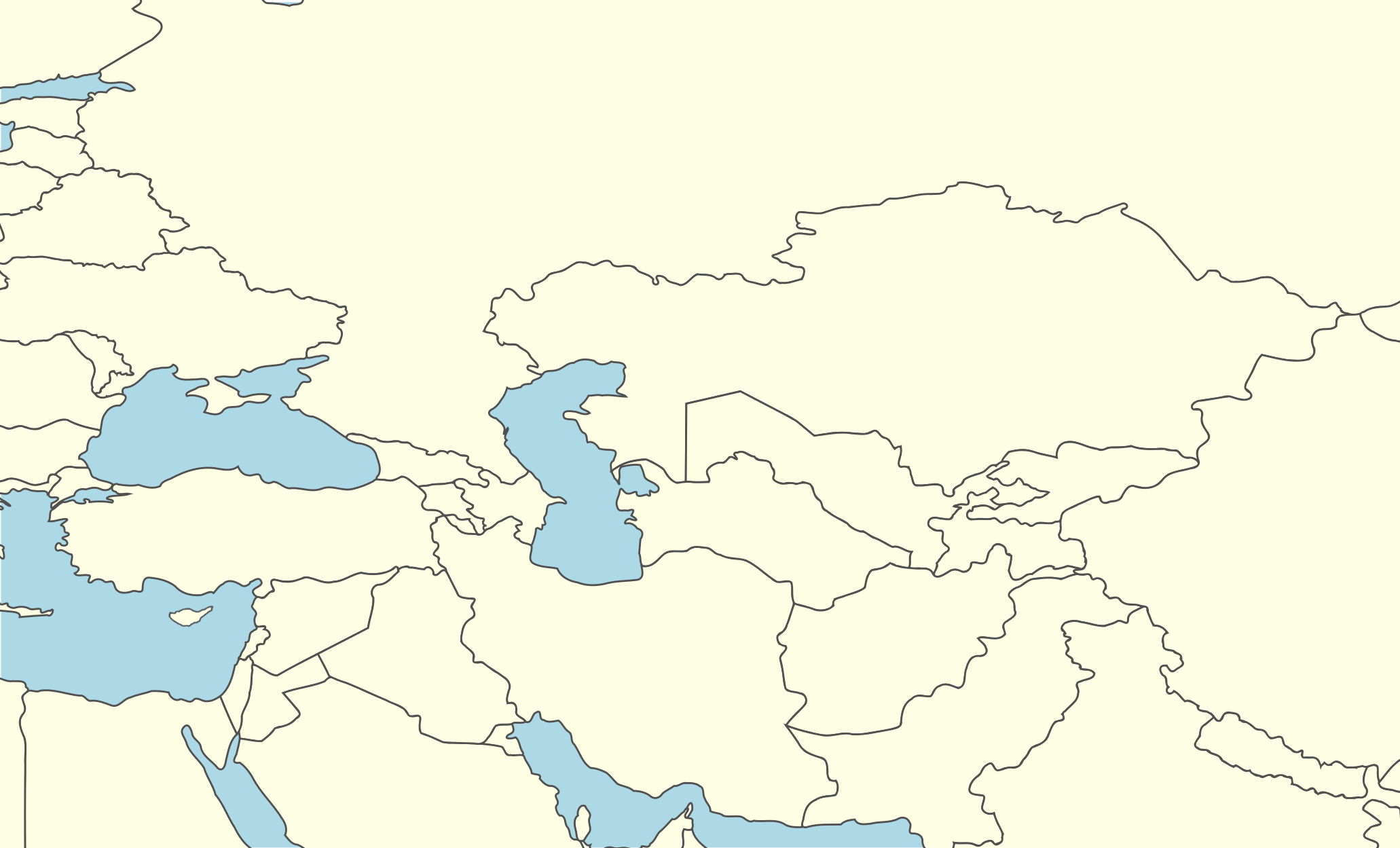
Location of Turkic Speaking States Summits

The following lists the Turkic Speaking States Heads of States Summits organized between 1992 and 2010. These summits were followed by the Turkic Council summits between 2011 and 2021 and as Organization of Turkic States summits since 2022.

== 1st summit ==
The first Turkic Speaking States summit was held in Ankara, Turkey, on October 30, 1992.

Participants

Abulfaz Elchibey, President of Azerbaijan

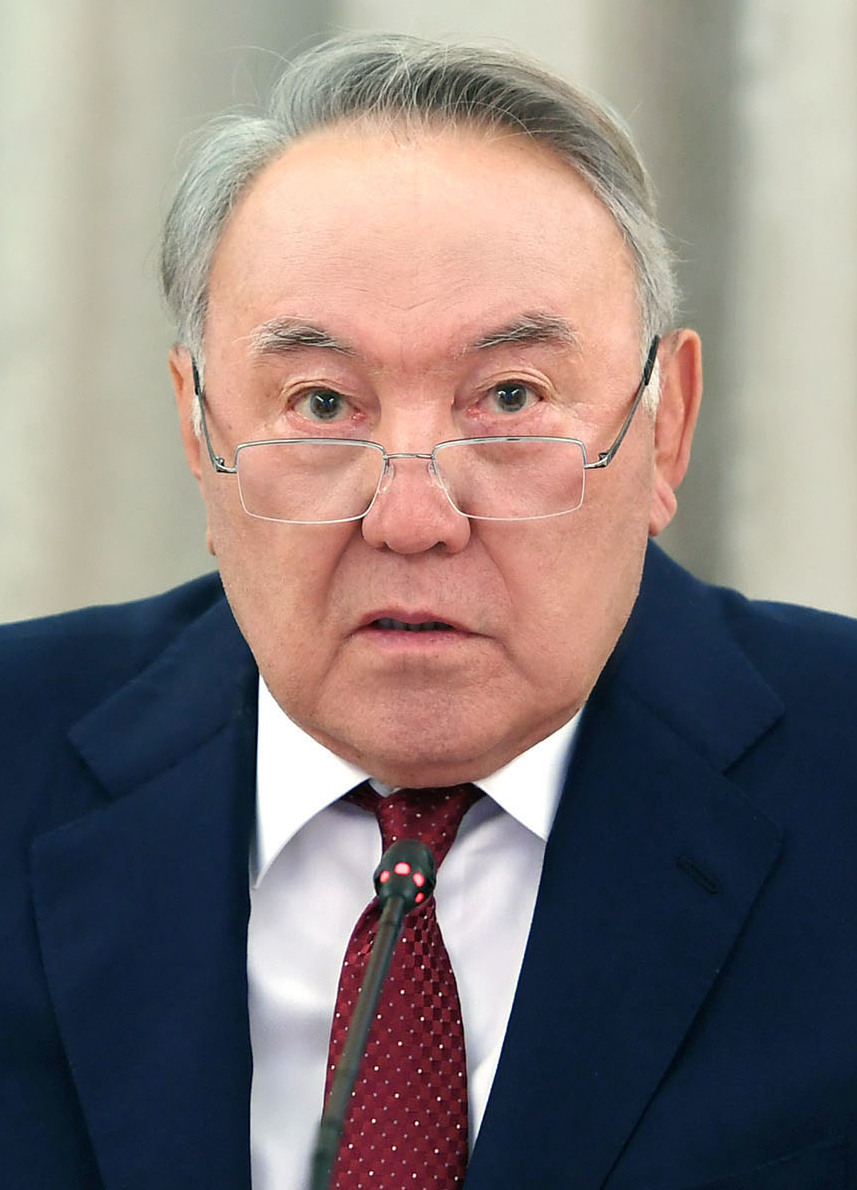
Nursultan Nazarbayev, President of Kazakhstan

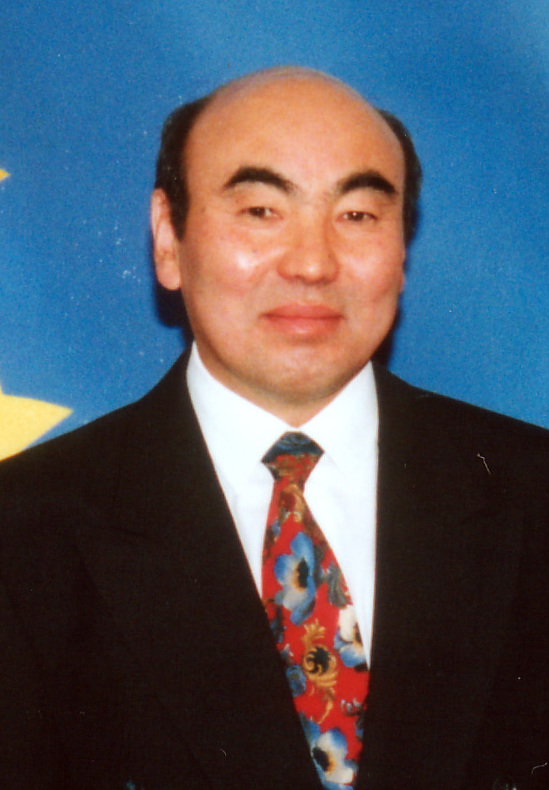
Askar Akayev, President of Kyrgyzstan

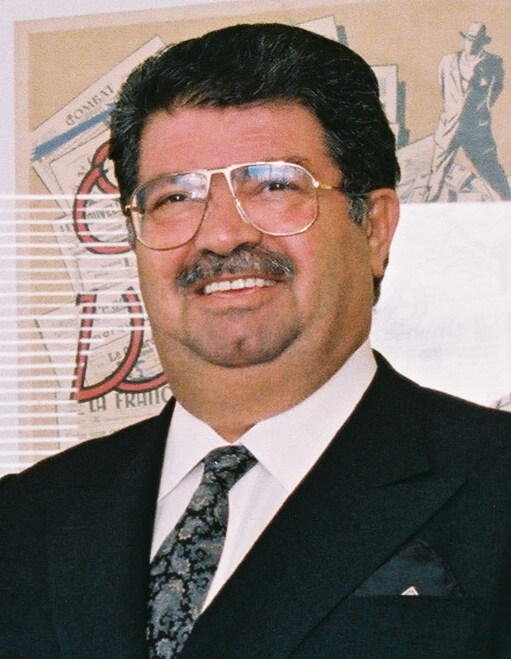
Turgut Özal, President of Turkey (host)

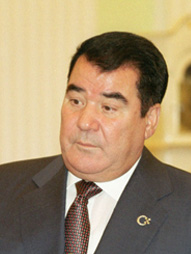
Saparmurat Niyazov, President of Turkmenistan

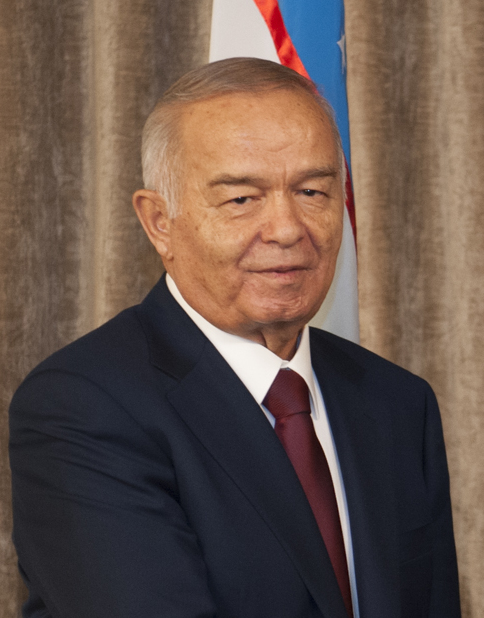
Islam Karimov, President of Uzbekistan

== 2nd summit ==
The second Turkic Speaking States summit was held in Istanbul, Turkey, on October 18, 1994.

Participants

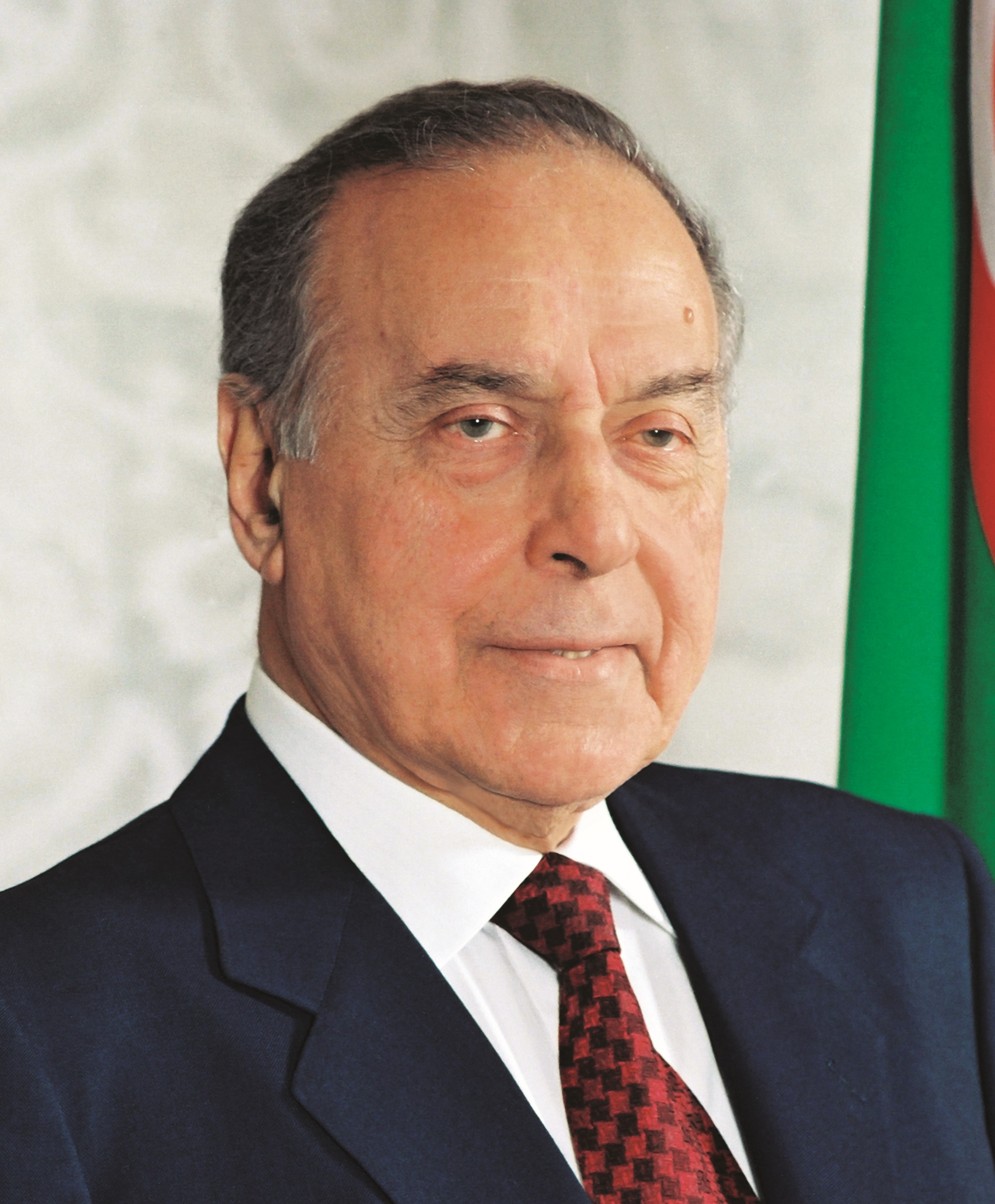
Heydar Aliyev, President of Azerbaijan

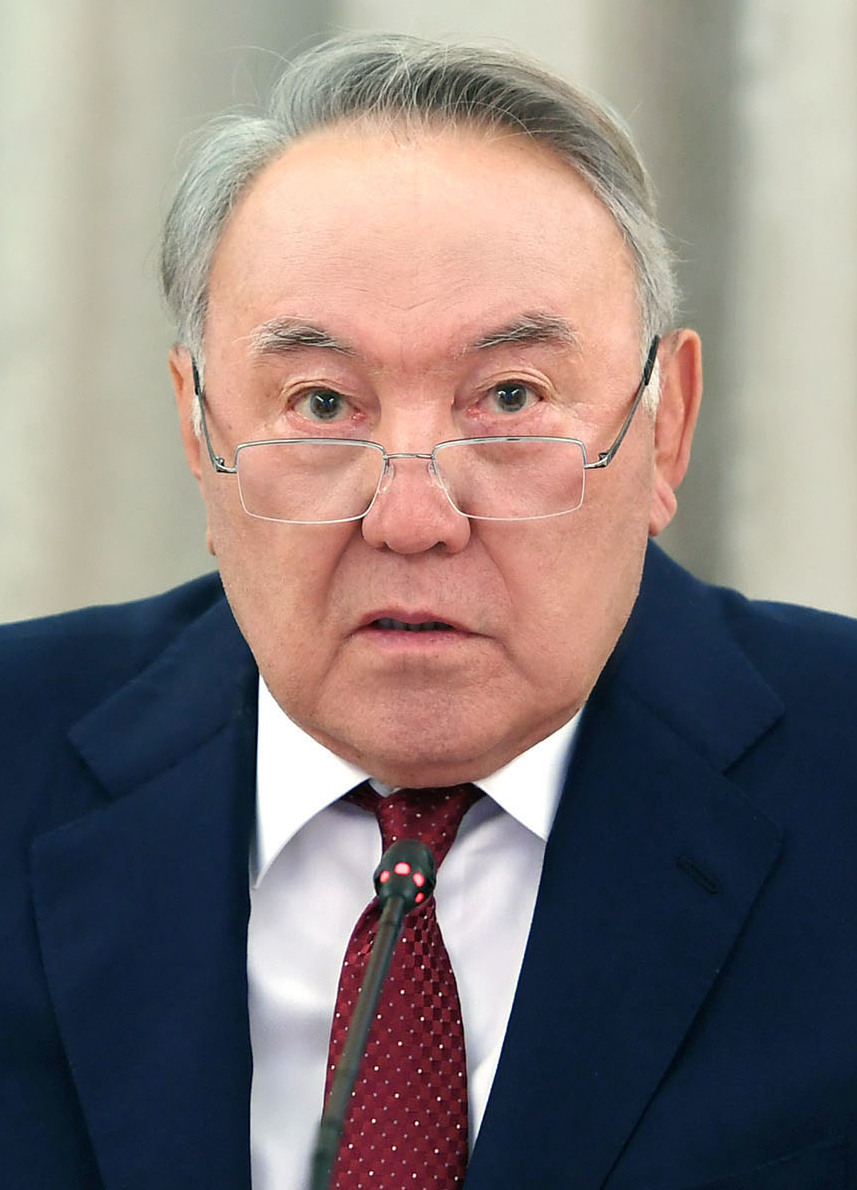
Nursultan Nazarbayev, President of Kazakhstan

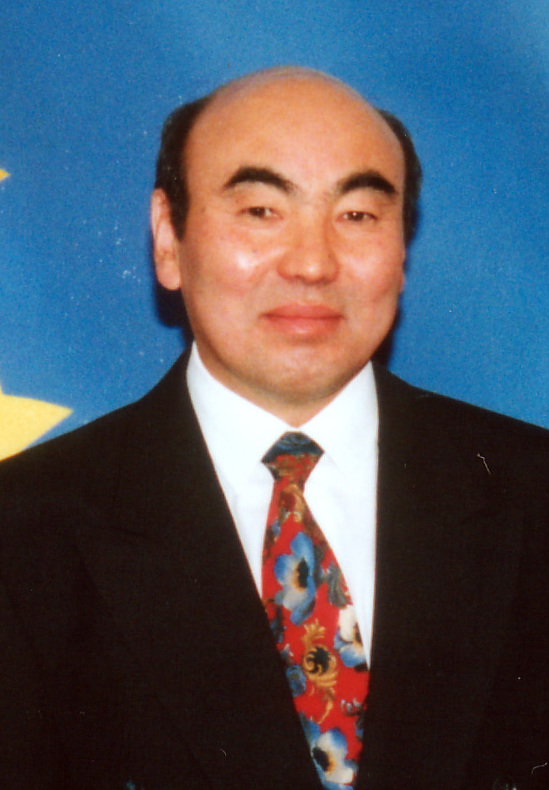
Askar Akayev, President of Kyrgyzstan

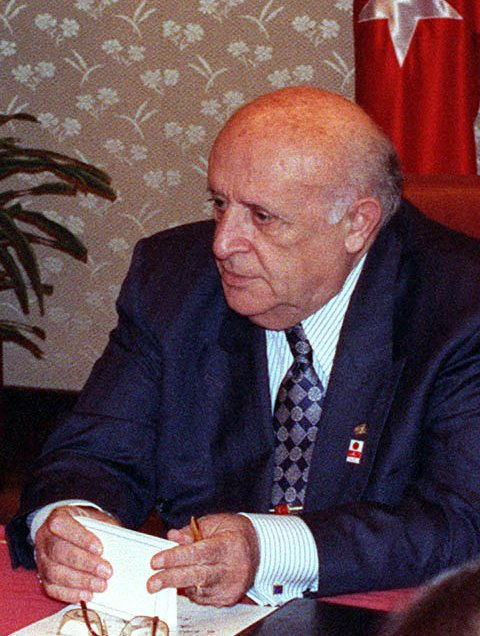
Süleyman Demirel, President of Turkey (host)

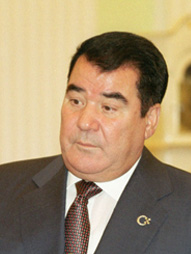
Saparmurat Niyazov, President of Turkmenistan

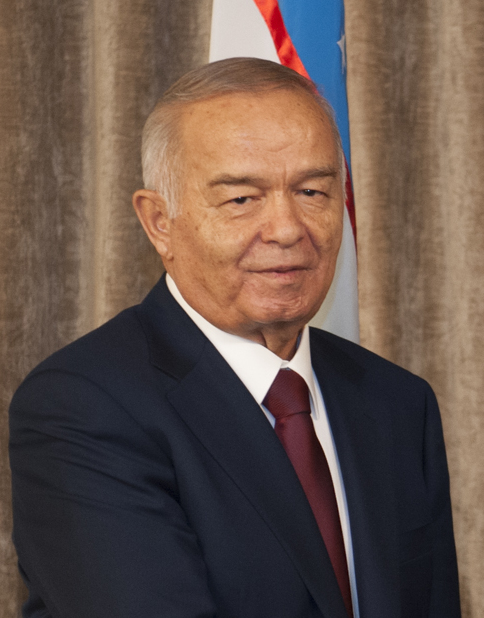
Islam Karimov, President of Uzbekistan

== 3rd summit ==
The third Turkic Speaking States summit was held in Bishkek, Kyrgyzstan, on August 28, 1995.

Participants

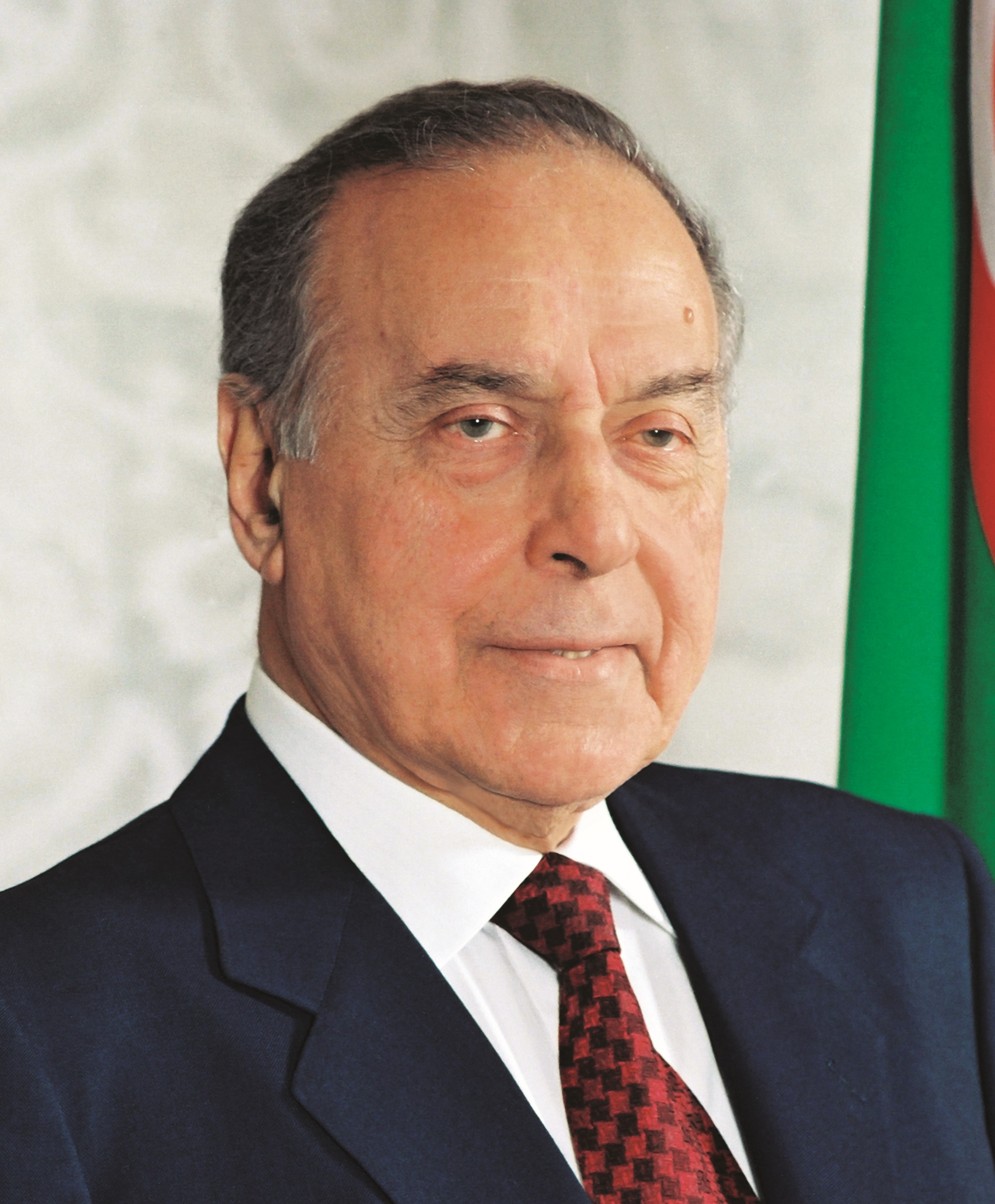
Heydar Aliyev, President of Azerbaijan

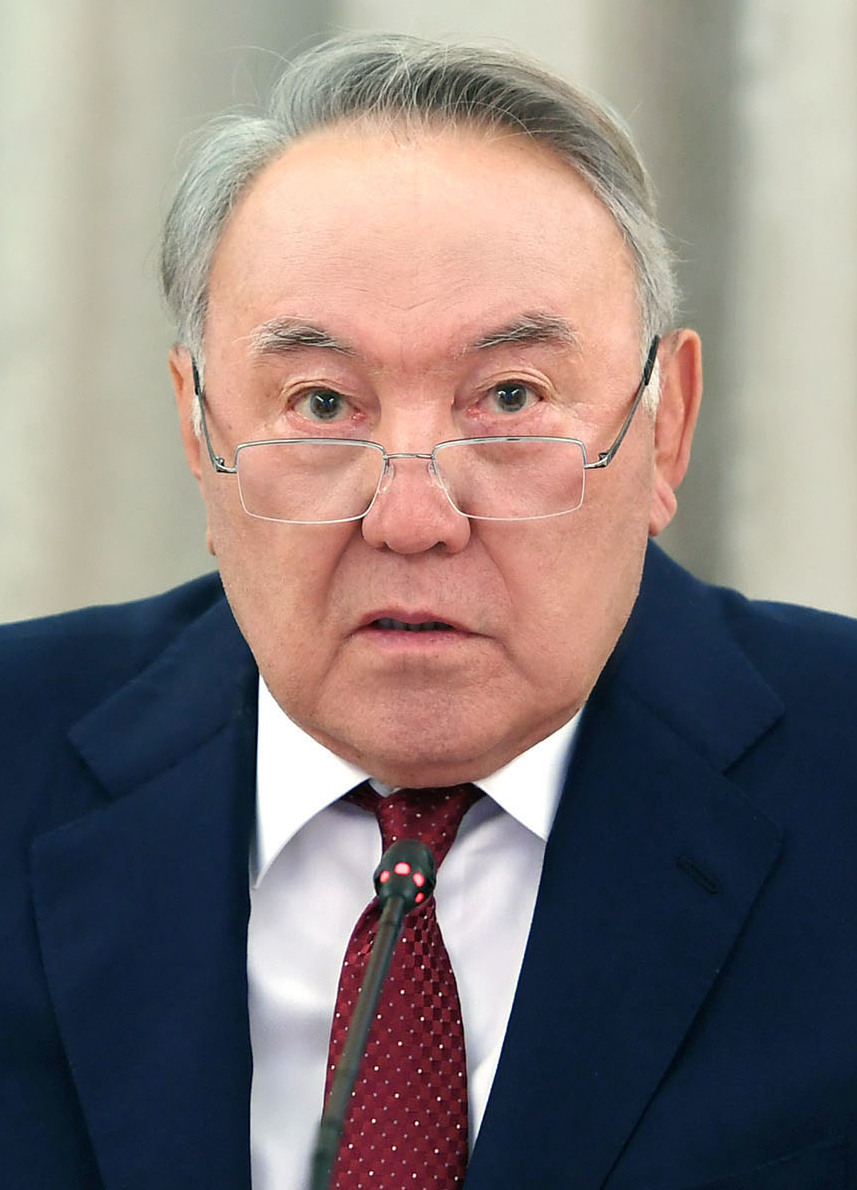
Nursultan Nazarbayev, President of Kazakhstan

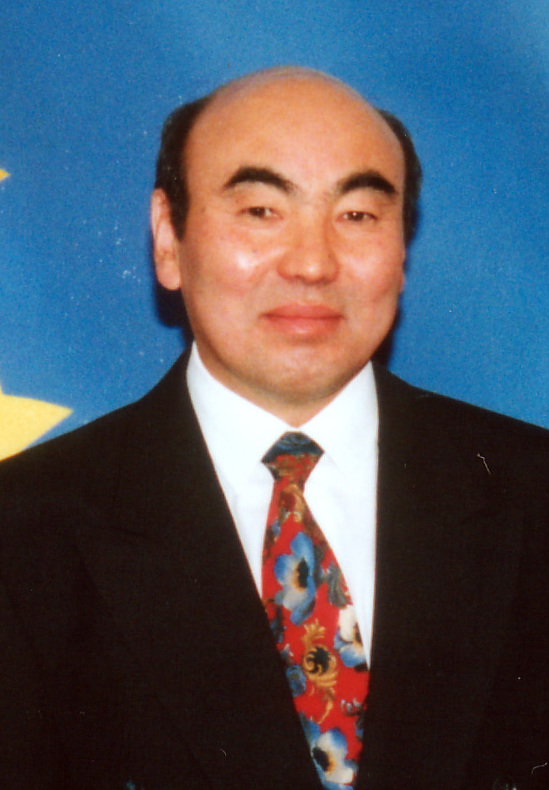
Askar Akayev, President of Kyrgyzstan (host)

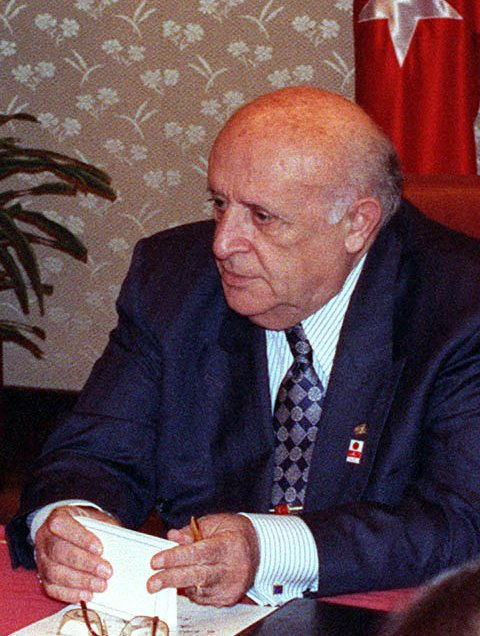
Süleyman Demirel, President of Turkey

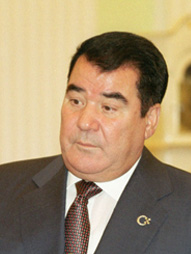
Saparmurat Niyazov, President of Turkmenistan

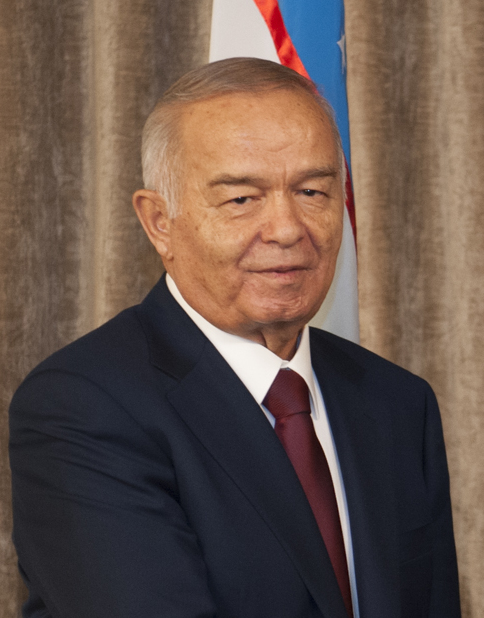
Islam Karimov, President of Uzbekistan

== 4th summit ==
The fourth Turkic Speaking States summit was held in Tashkent, Uzbekistan, on October 21, 1996.

Participants

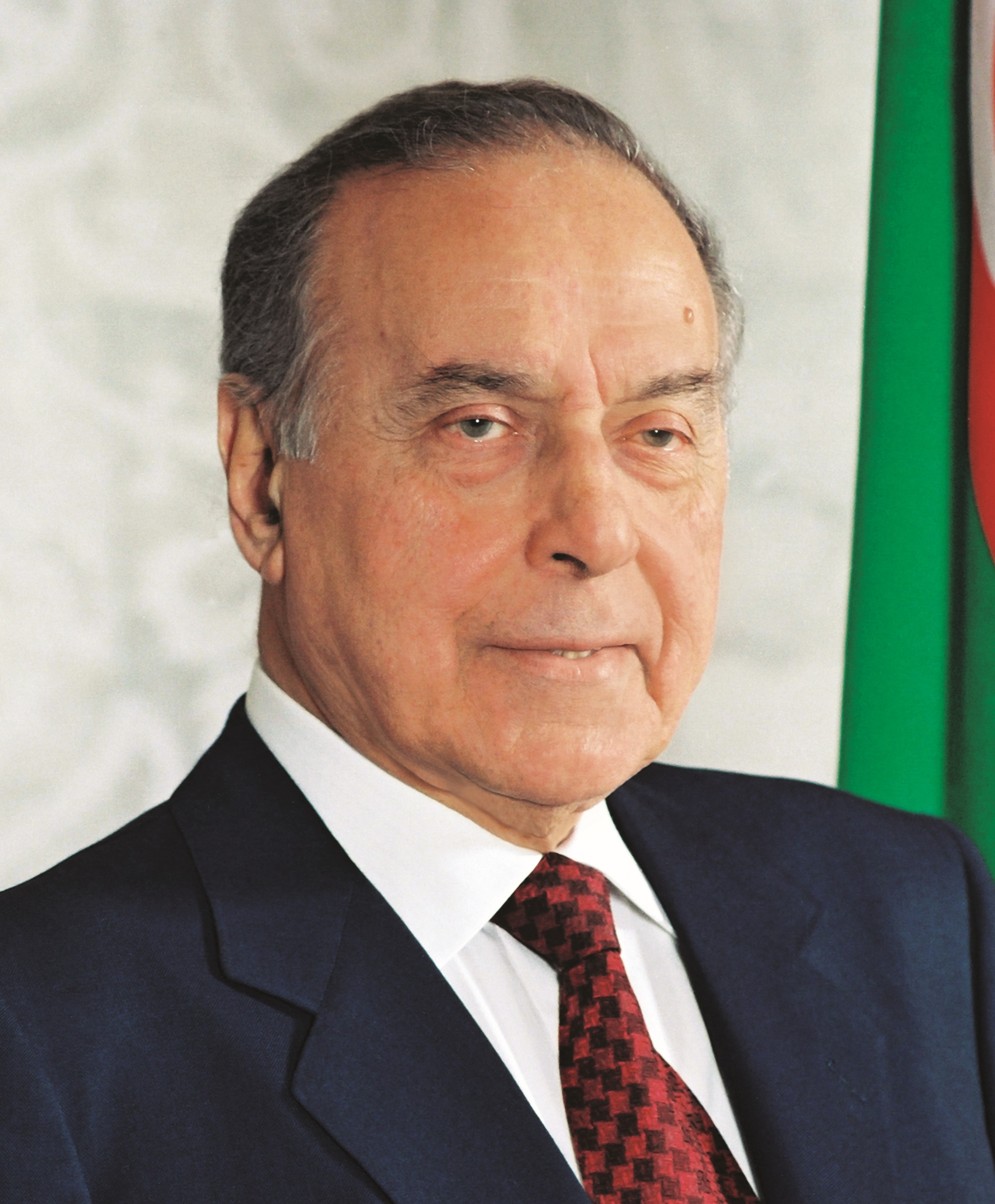
Heydar Aliyev, President of Azerbaijan

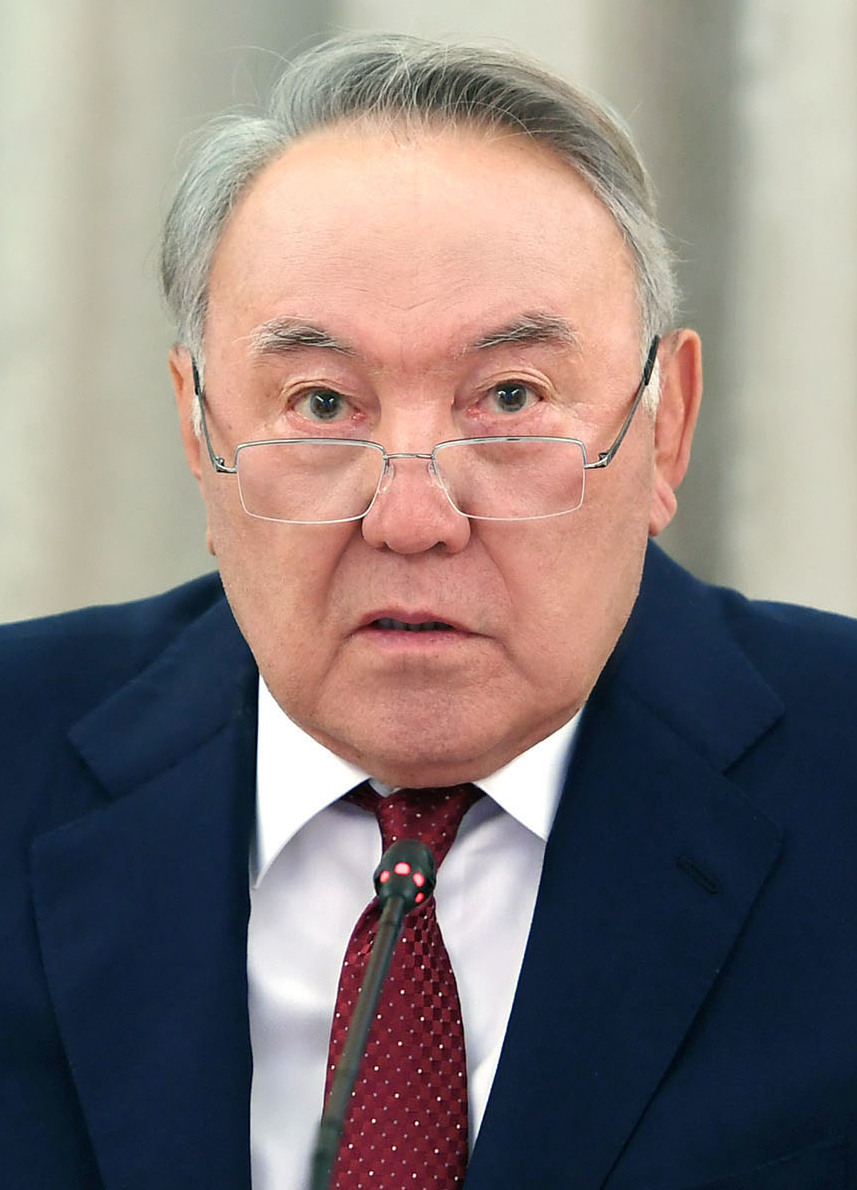
Nursultan Nazarbayev, President of Kazakhstan

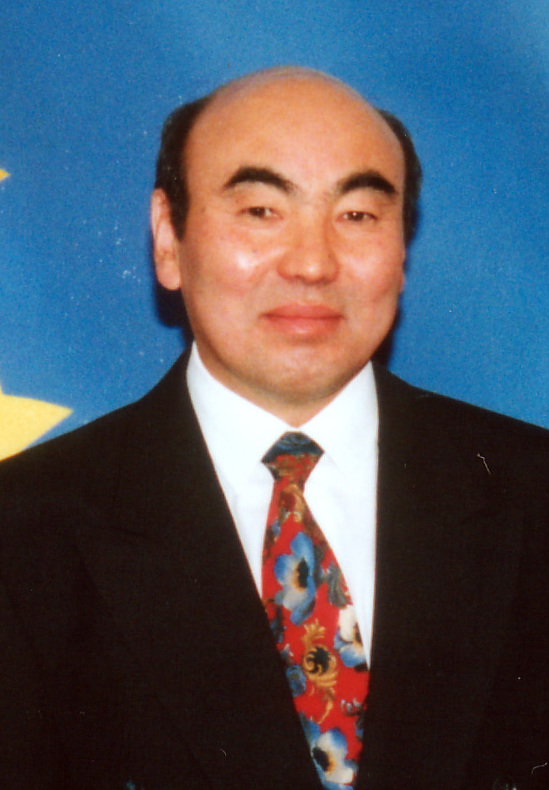
Askar Akayev, President of Kyrgyzstan

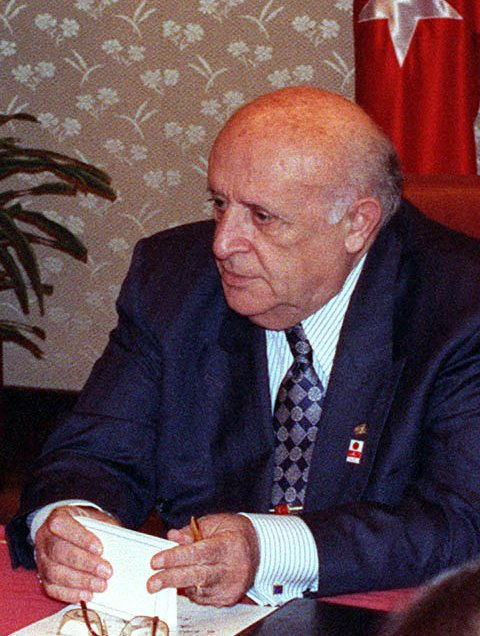
Süleyman Demirel, President of Turkey

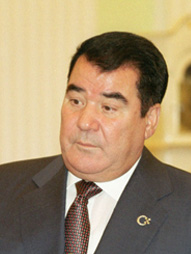
Saparmurat Niyazov, President of Turkmenistan

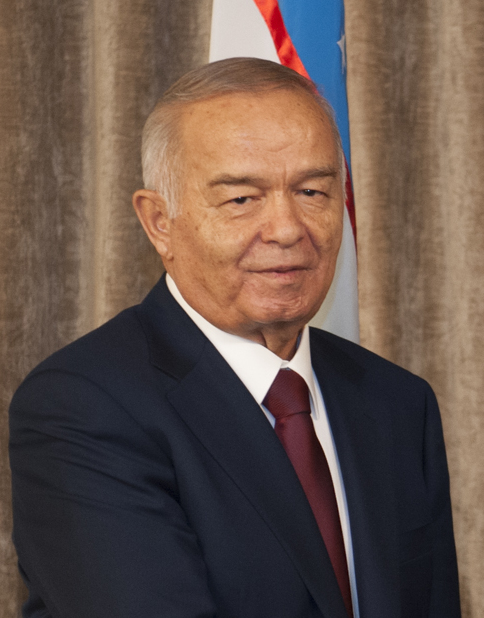
Islam Karimov, President of Uzbekistan (host)

== 5th summit ==
The fifth Turkic Speaking States summit was held in Astana, Kazakhstan, on June 9, 1998.

Participants

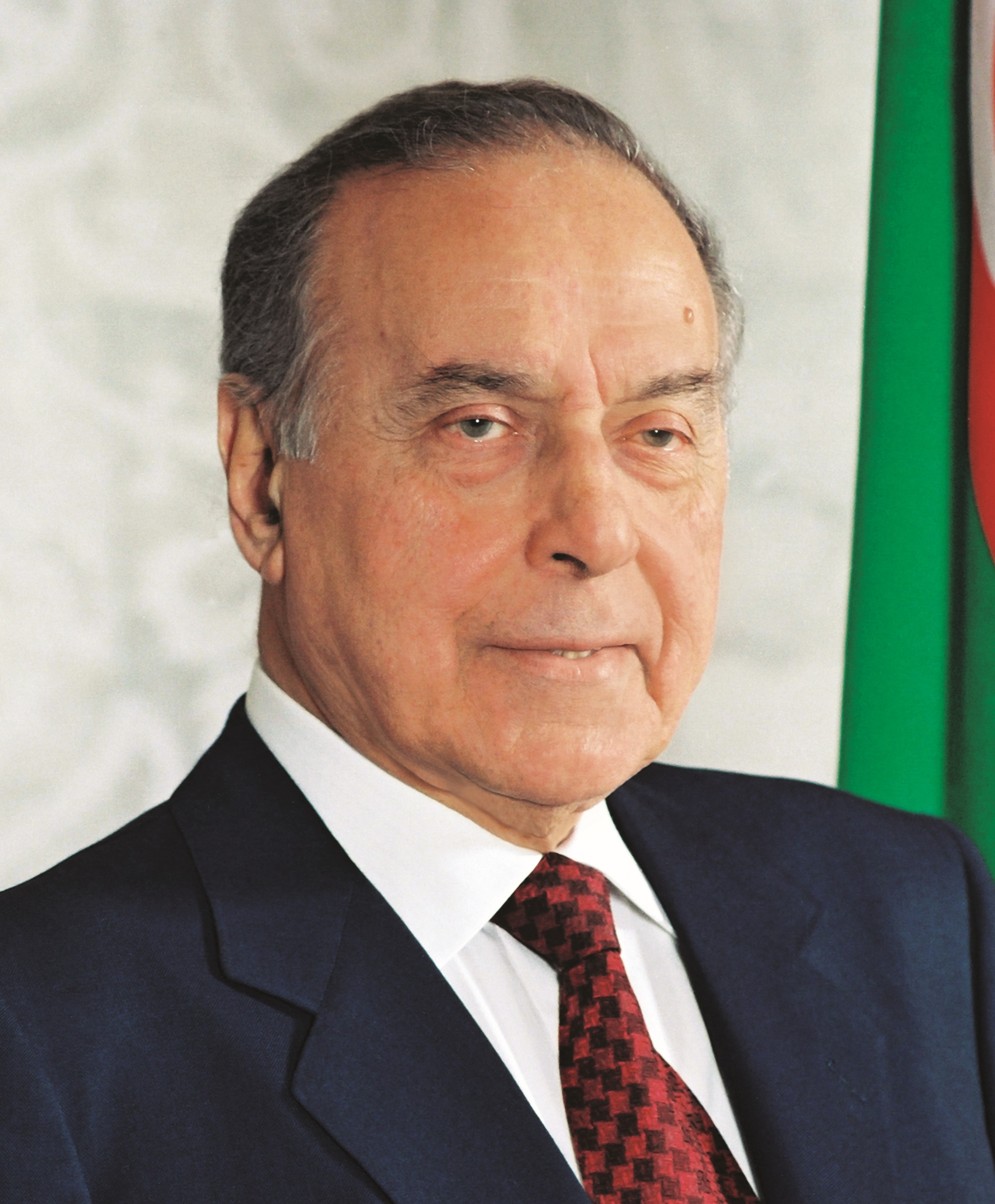
Heydar Aliyev, President of Azerbaijan

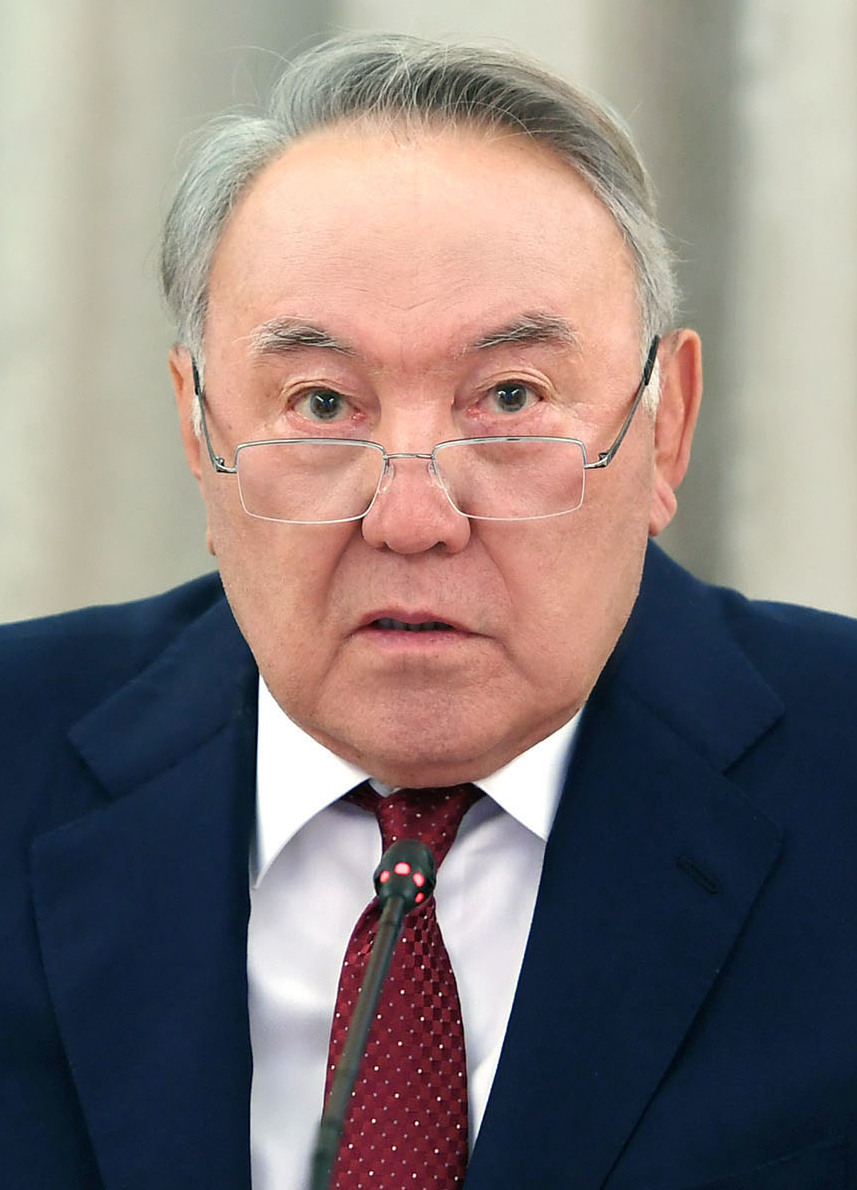
Nursultan Nazarbayev, President of Kazakhstan (host)

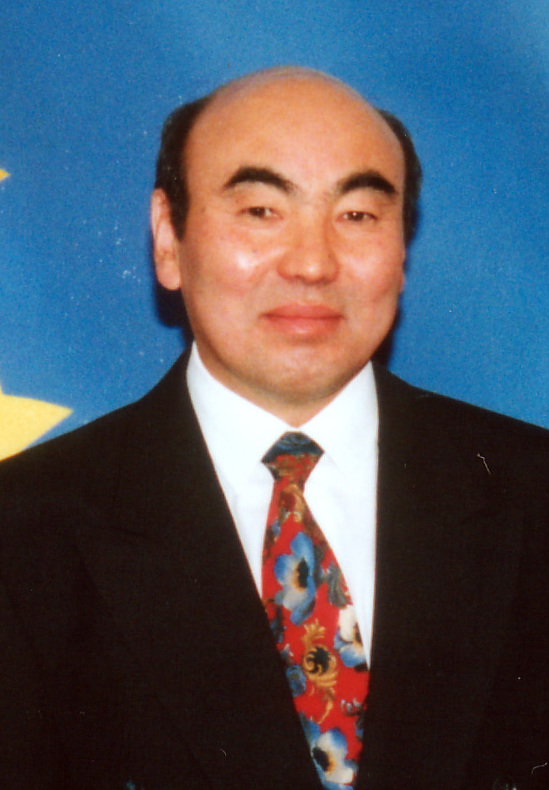
Askar Akayev, President of Kyrgyzstan

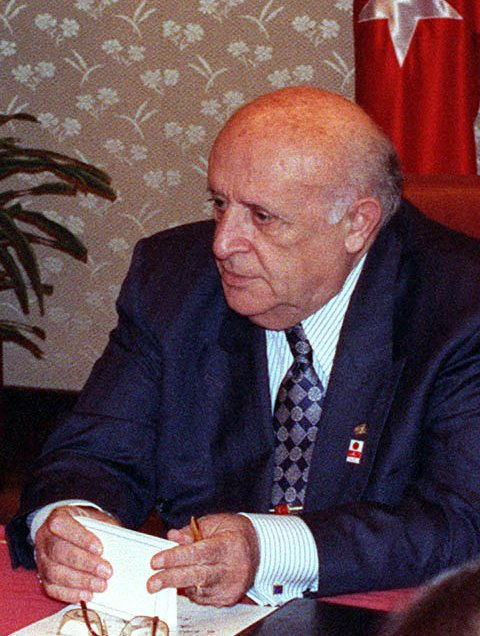
Süleyman Demirel, President of Turkey

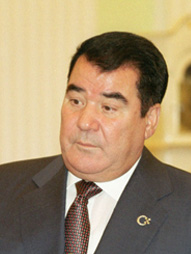
Saparmurat Niyazov, President of Turkmenistan

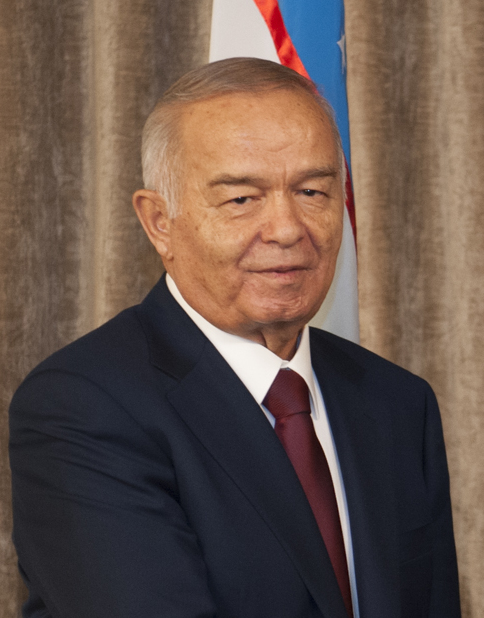
Islam Karimov, President of Uzbekistan

== 6th summit ==
The sixth Turkic Speaking States summit was held in Baku, Azerbaijan, on April 8, 2000.

Participants

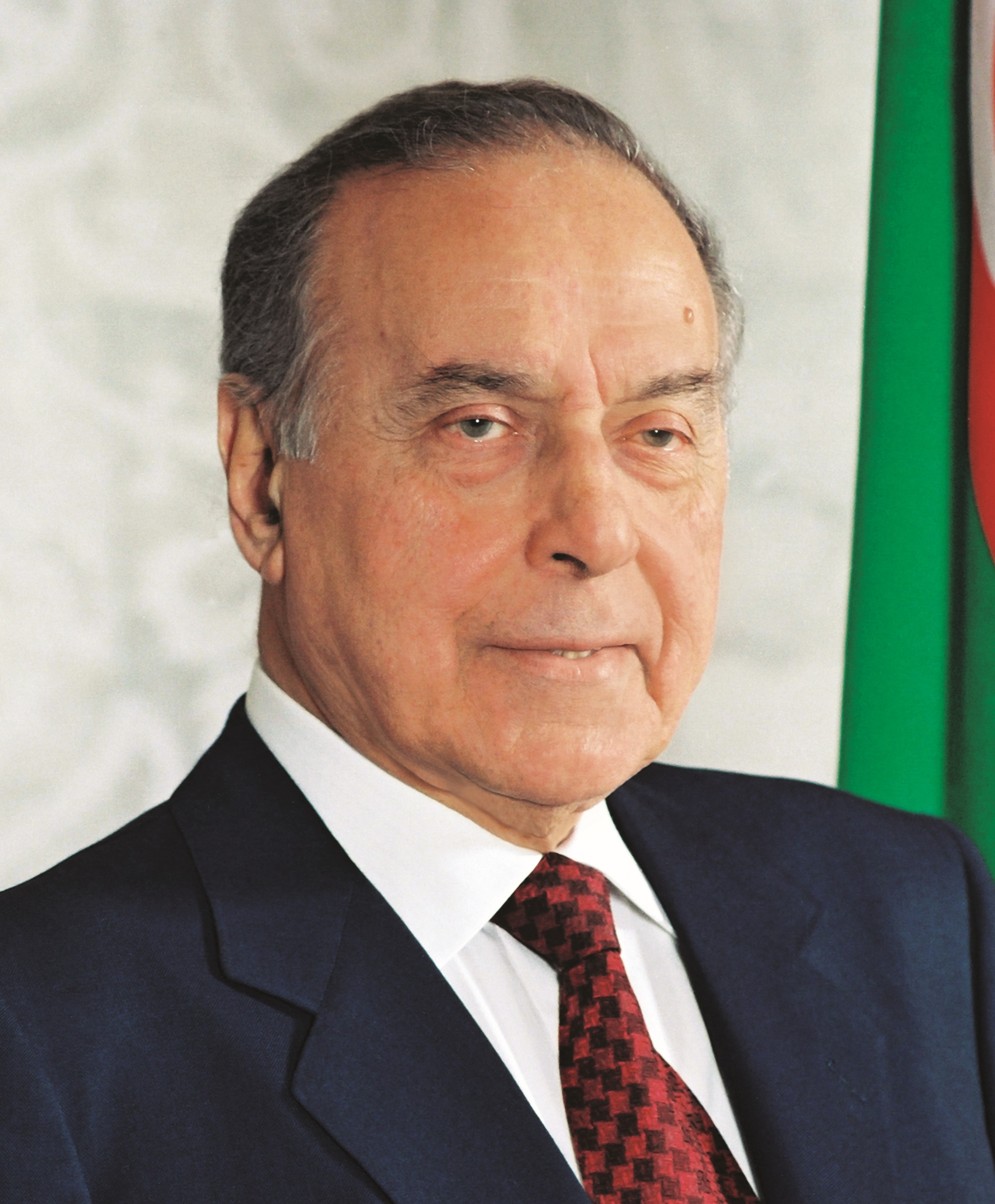
Heydar Aliyev, President of Azerbaijan (host)

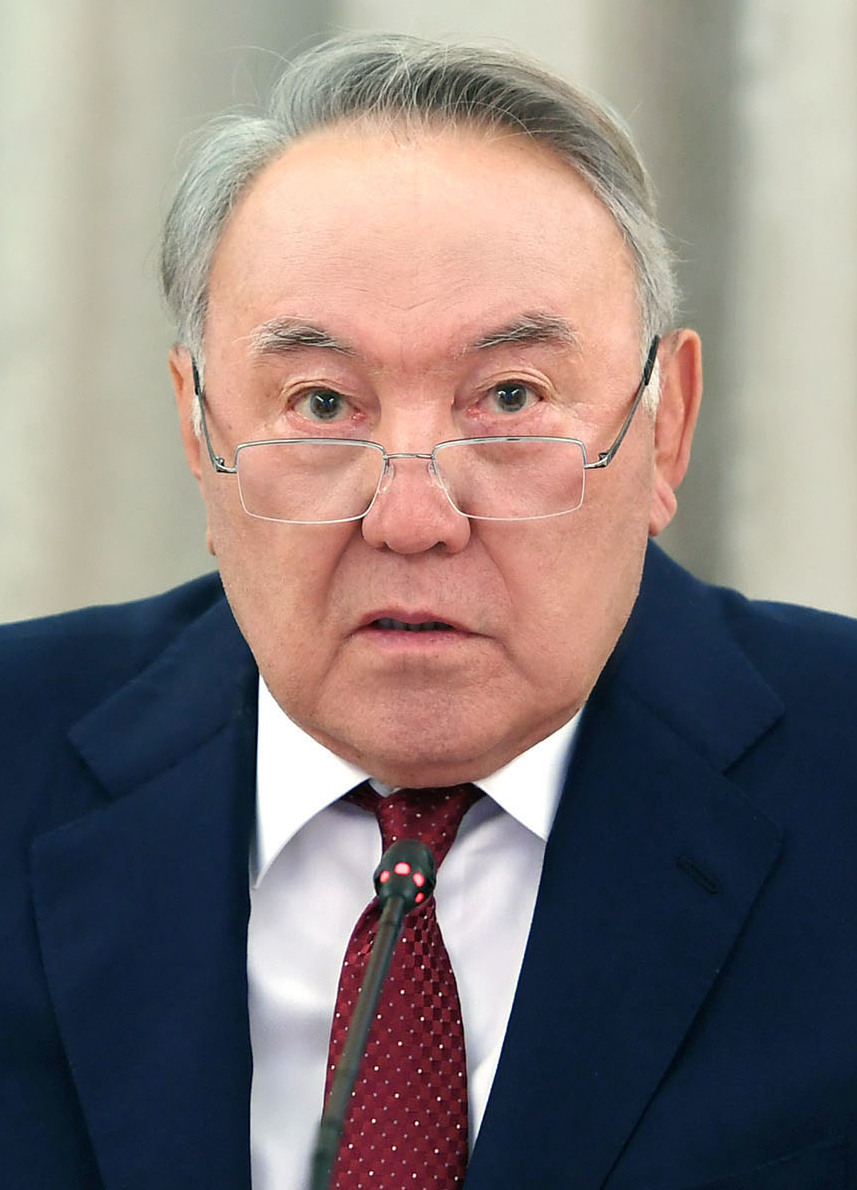
Nursultan Nazarbayev, President of Kazakhstan

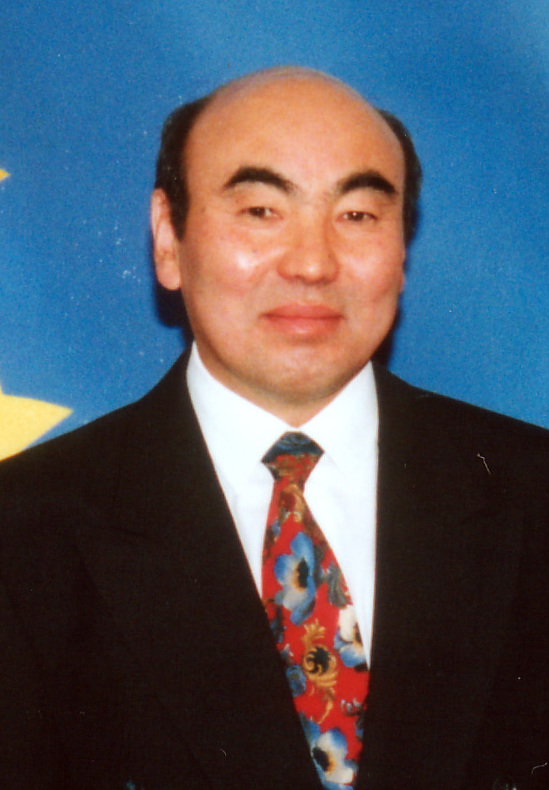
Askar Akayev, President of Kyrgyzstan

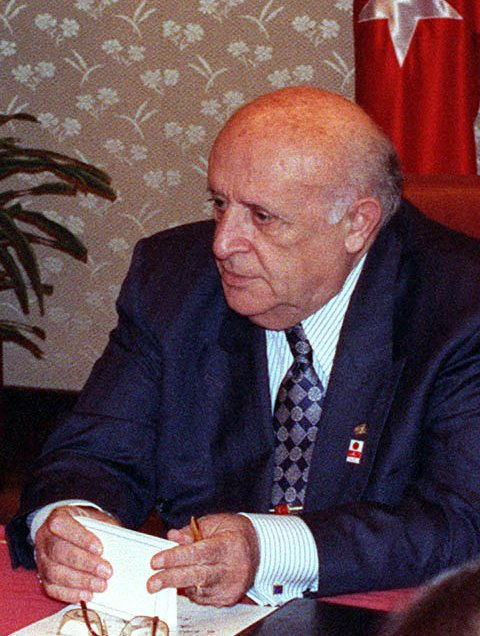
Süleyman Demirel, President of Turkey

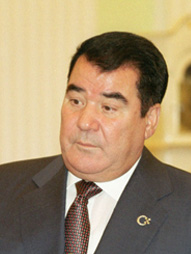
Saparmurat Niyazov, President of Turkmenistan

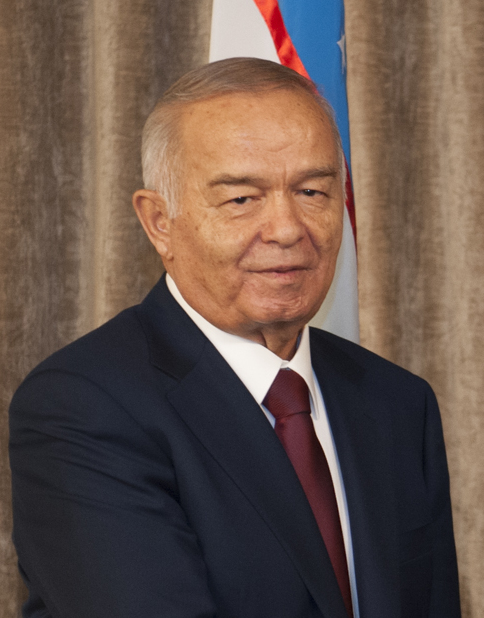
Islam Karimov, President of Uzbekistan

== 7th summit ==
The seventh Turkic Speaking States summit was held in Istanbul, Turkey, on April 26, 2001.

Participants

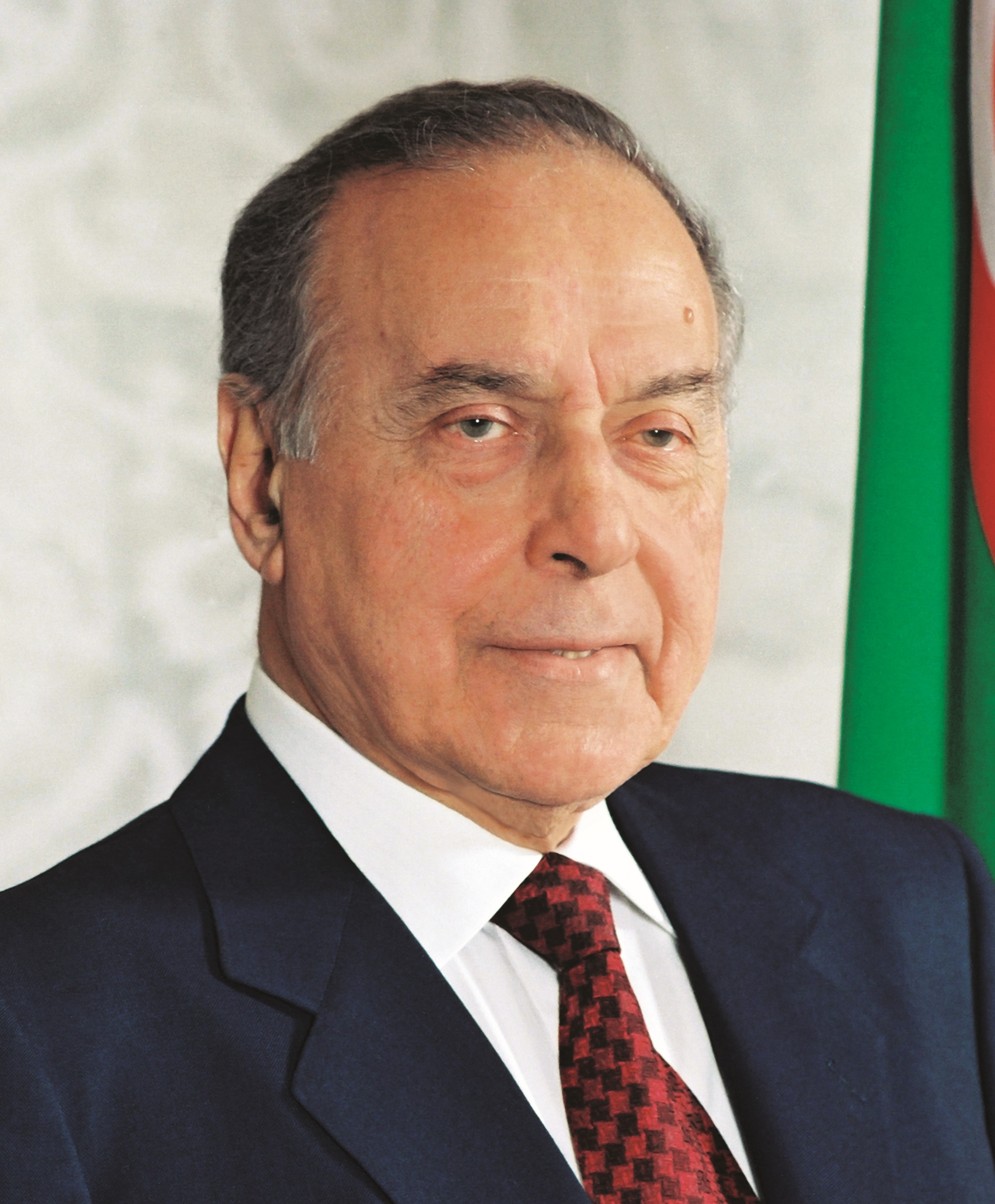
Heydar Aliyev, President of Azerbaijan

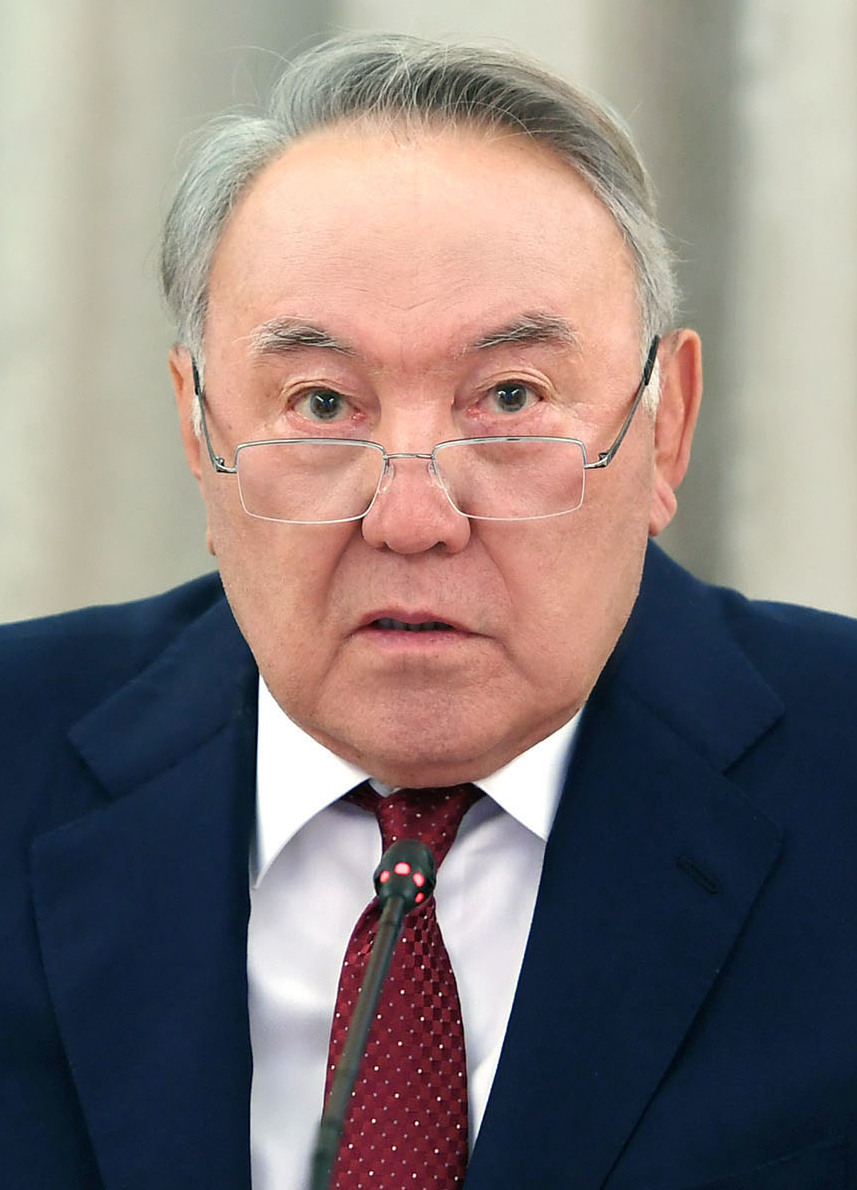
Nursultan Nazarbayev, President of Kazakhstan

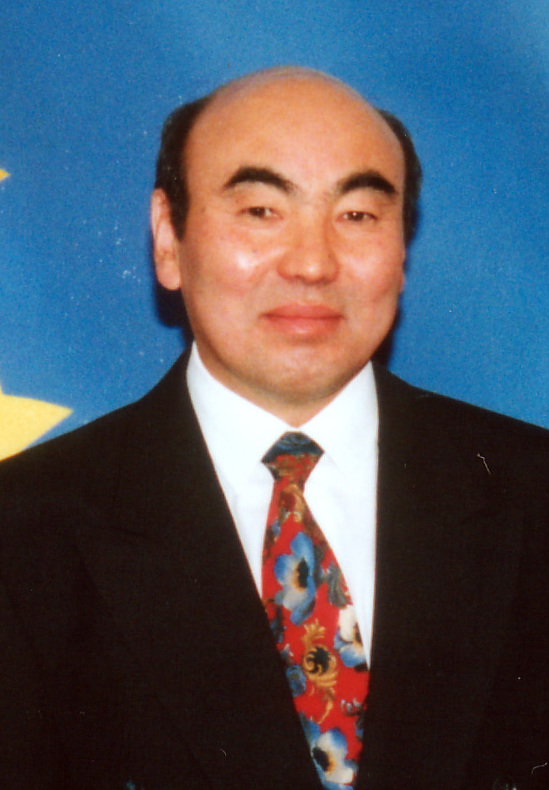
Askar Akayev, President of Kyrgyzstan

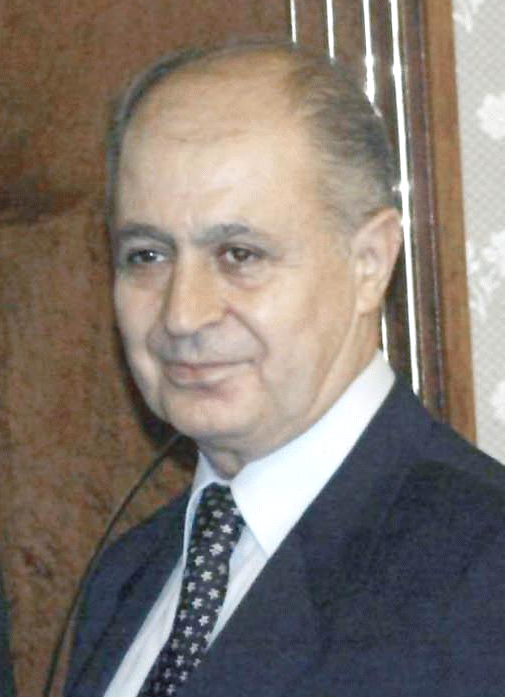
Ahmet Necdet Sezer, President of Turkey (host)

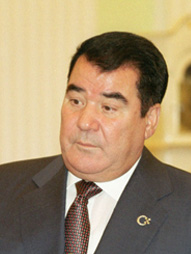
Saparmurat Niyazov, President of Turkmenistan

Erkin Halilov, Speaker of the Legislative Chamber of Uzbekistan

== 8th summit ==
The eighth Turkic Speaking States summit was held in Antalya, Turkey, on November 17, 2006.

Participants

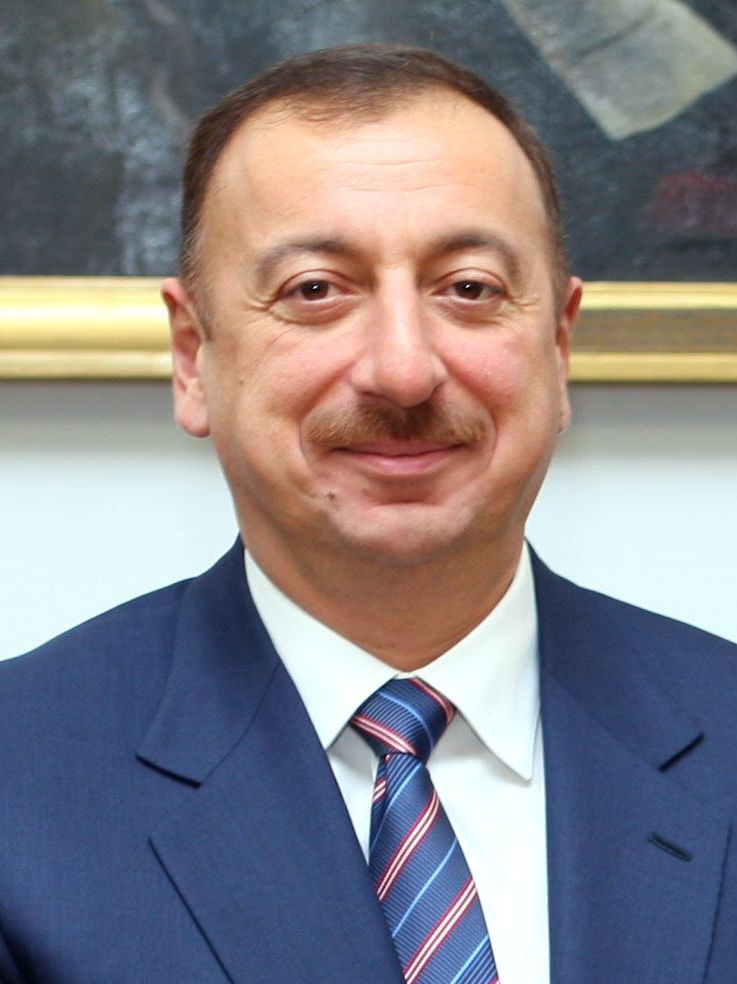
Ilham Aliyev, President of Azerbaijan

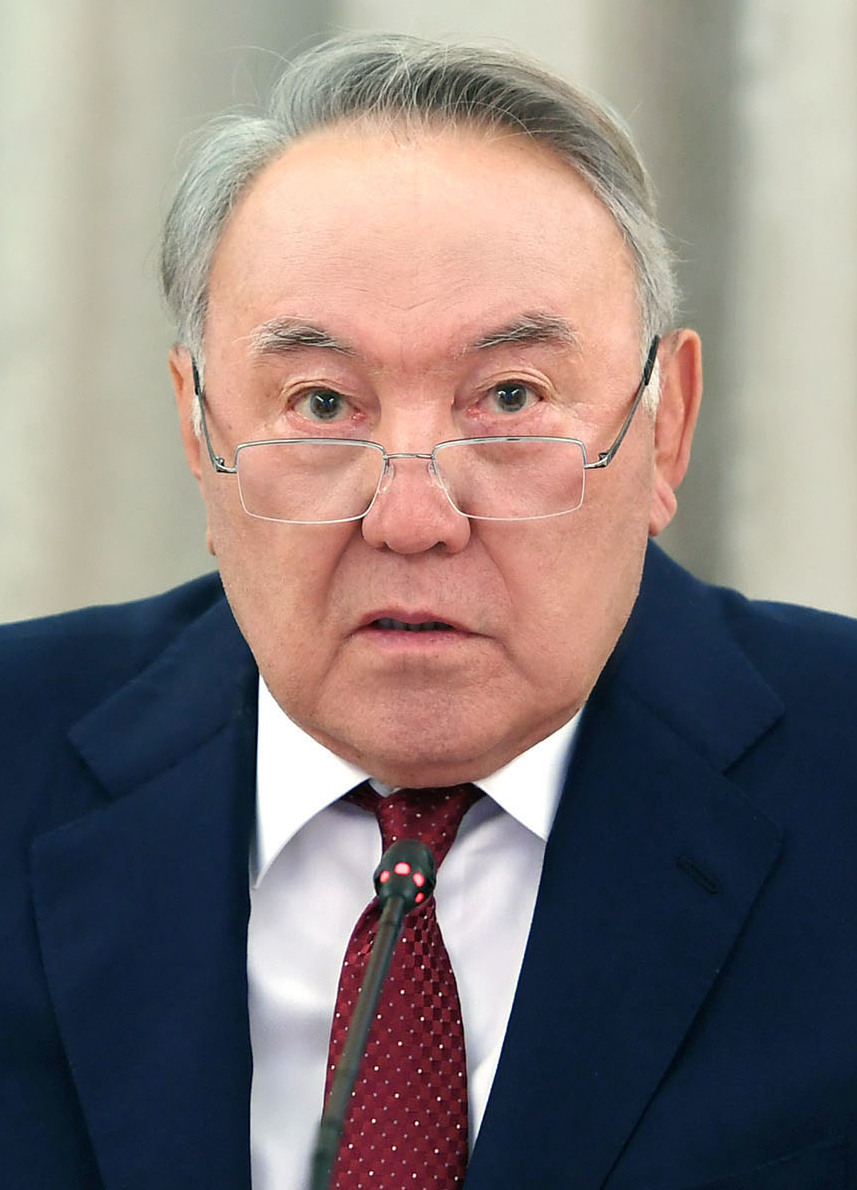
Nursultan Nazarbayev, President of Kazakhstan

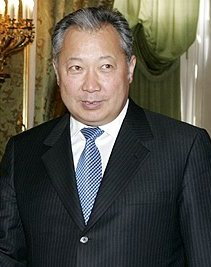
Kurmanbek Bakiyev, President of Kyrgyzstan

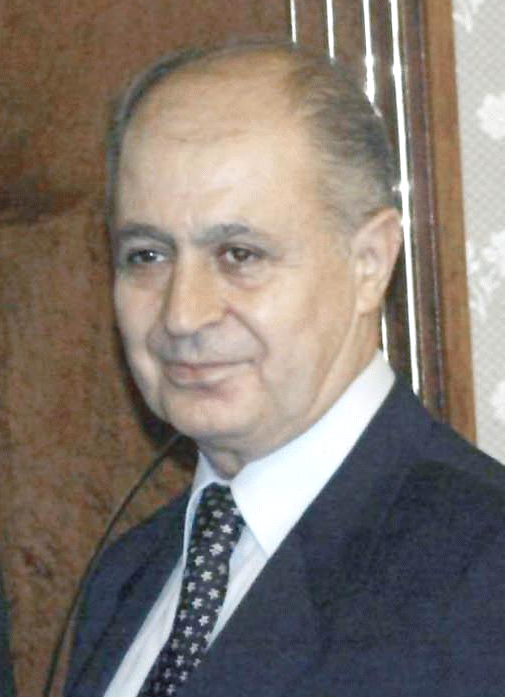
Ahmet Necdet Sezer, President of Turkey (host)

(Ambassador of Turkmenistan)

== 9th summit ==
The ninth Turkic Speaking States summit was held in Nakhchivan, Azerbaijan, on October 3, 2009. The Nakhchivan Agreement signed for founding the Turkic Council.

Participants

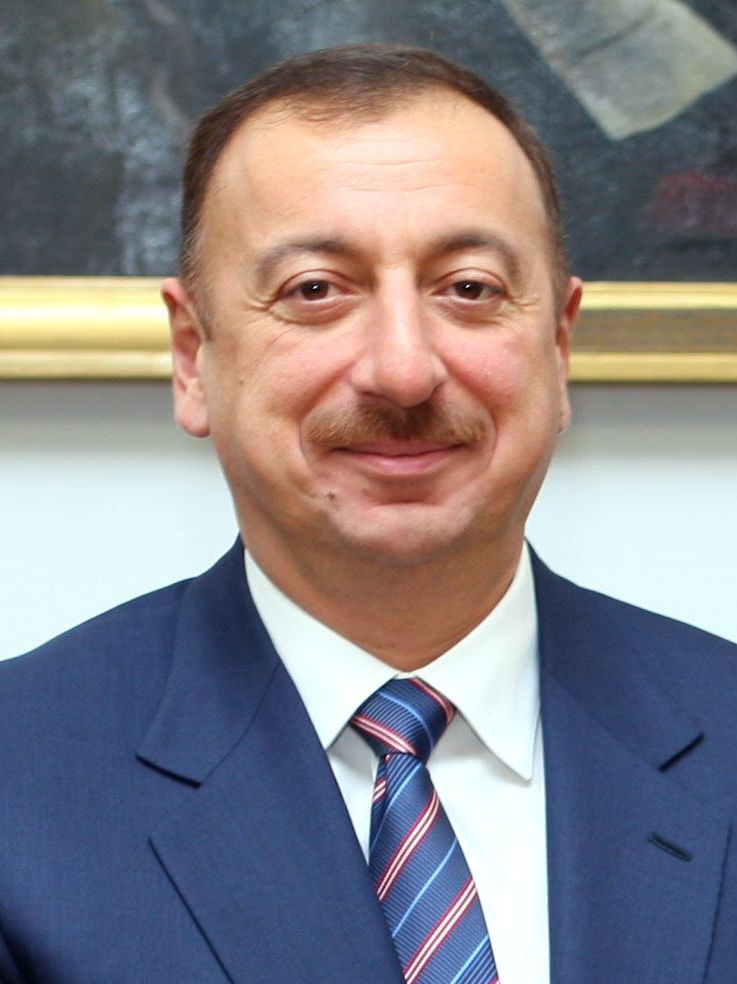
Ilham Aliyev, President of Azerbaijan (host)

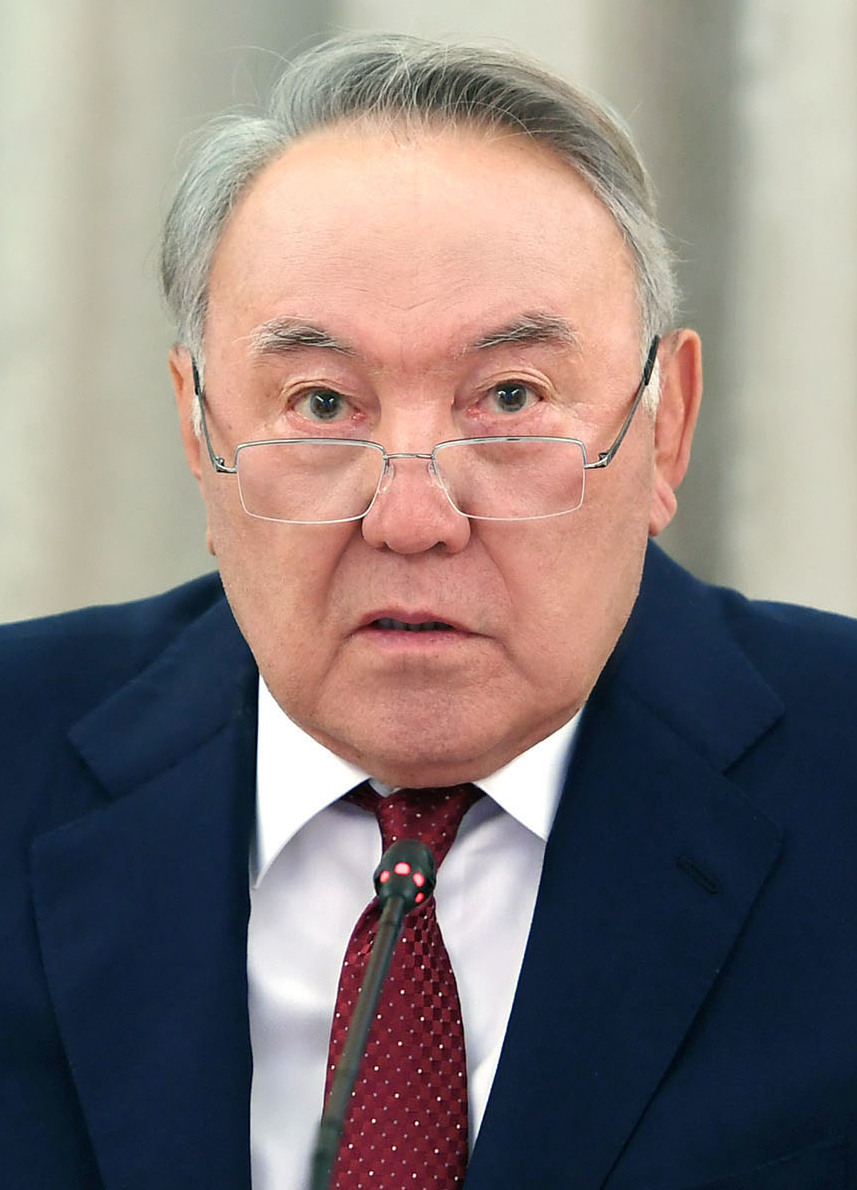
Nursultan Nazarbayev, President of Kazakhstan

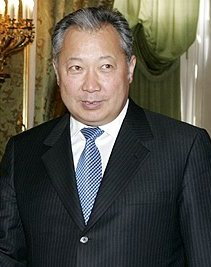
Kurmanbek Bakiyev, President of Kyrgyzstan

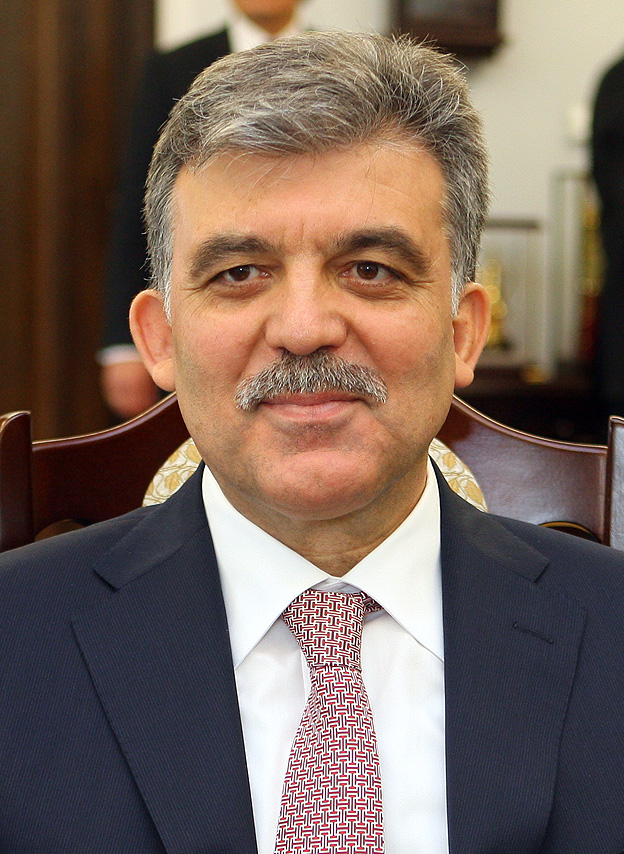
Abdullah Gül, President of Turkey

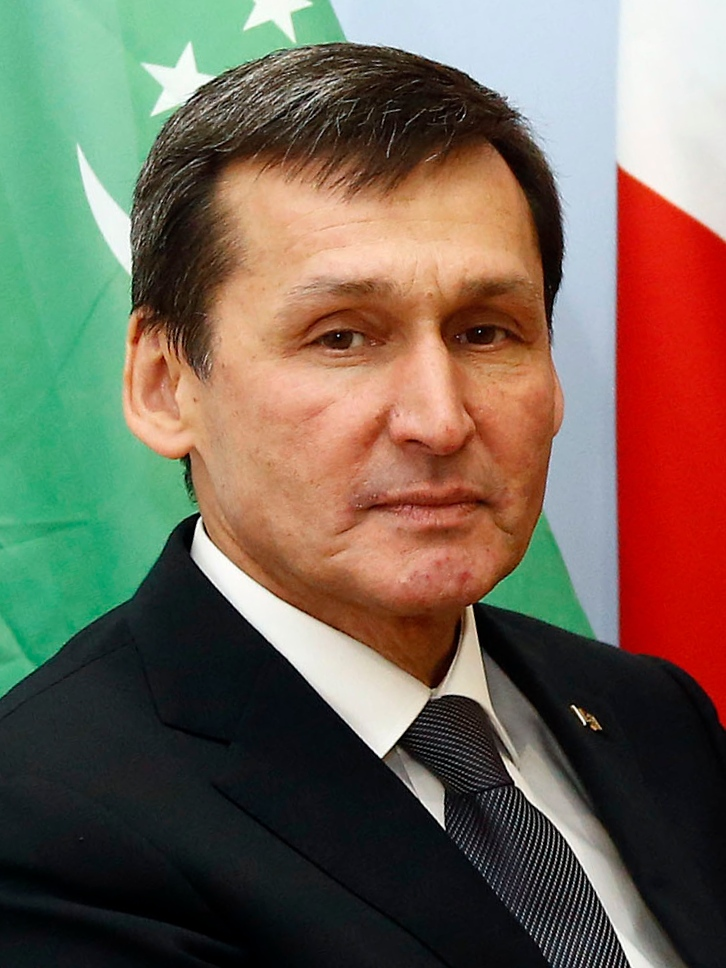
Raşit Meredow, Vice President of Turkmenistan

== 10th summit ==
The tenth and last Turkic Speaking States summit was held in Istanbul, Turkey, on September 15, 2010. A consultative board of elders has been established.

Participants

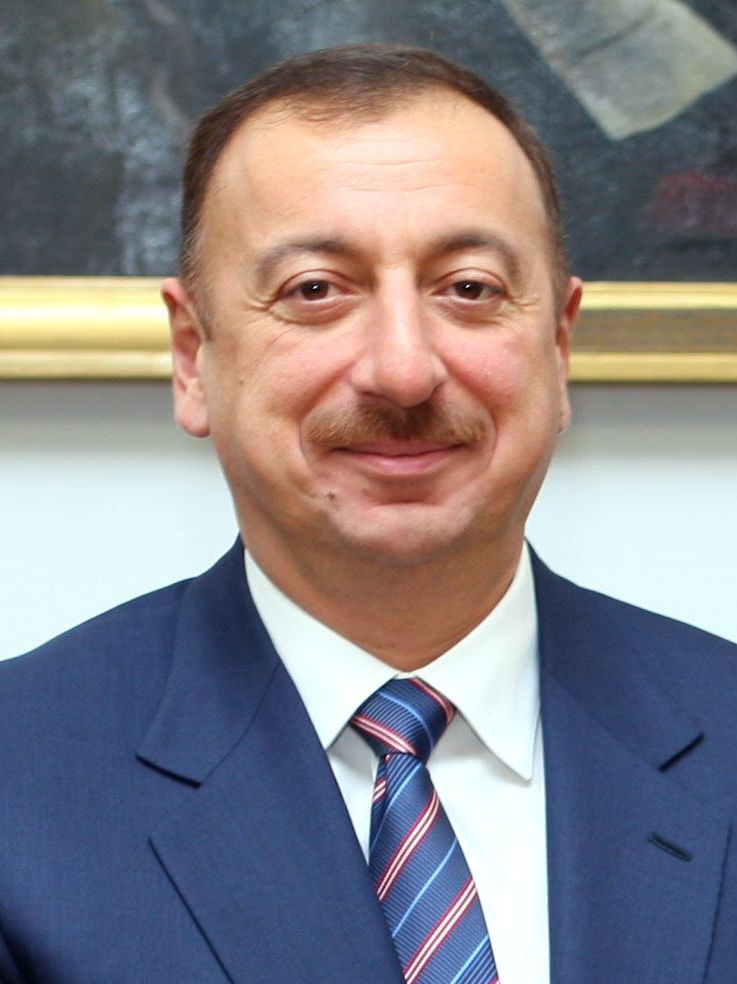
Ilham Aliyev, President of Azerbaijan

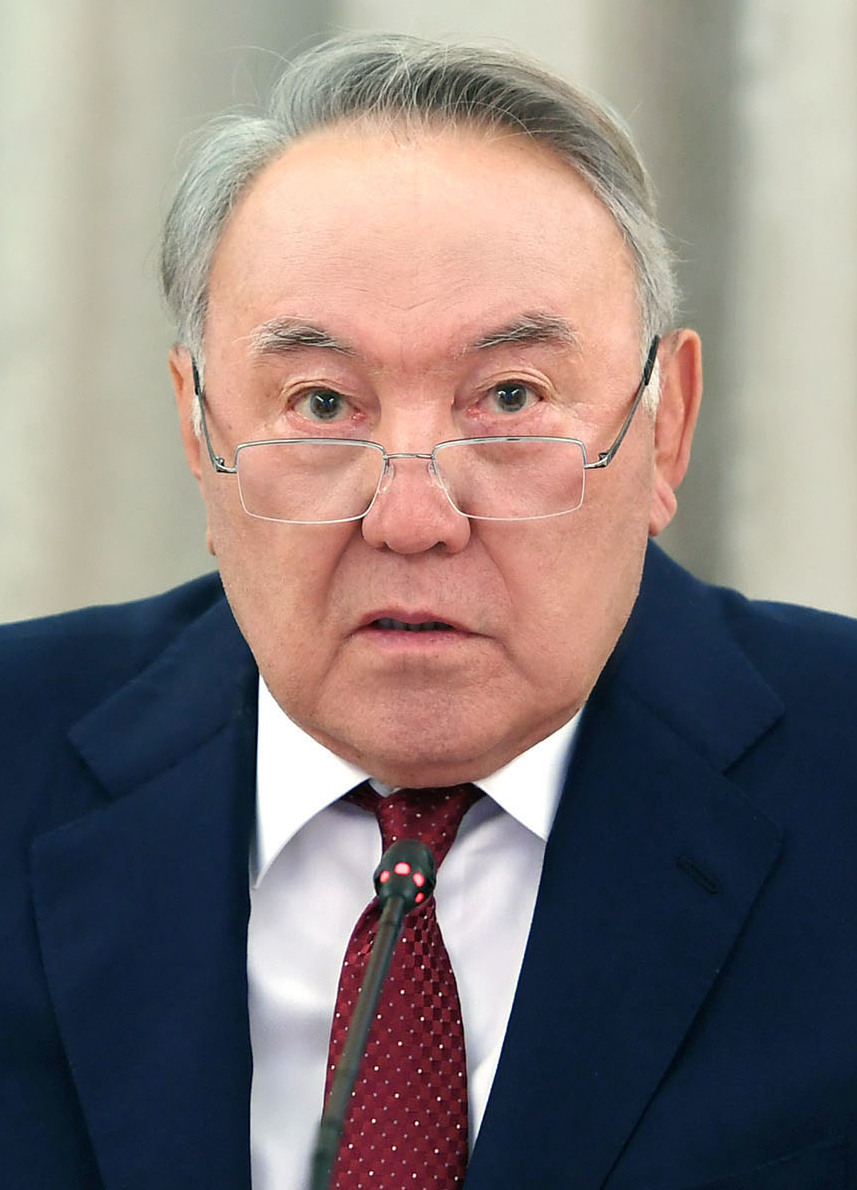
Nursultan Nazarbayev, President of Kazakhstan

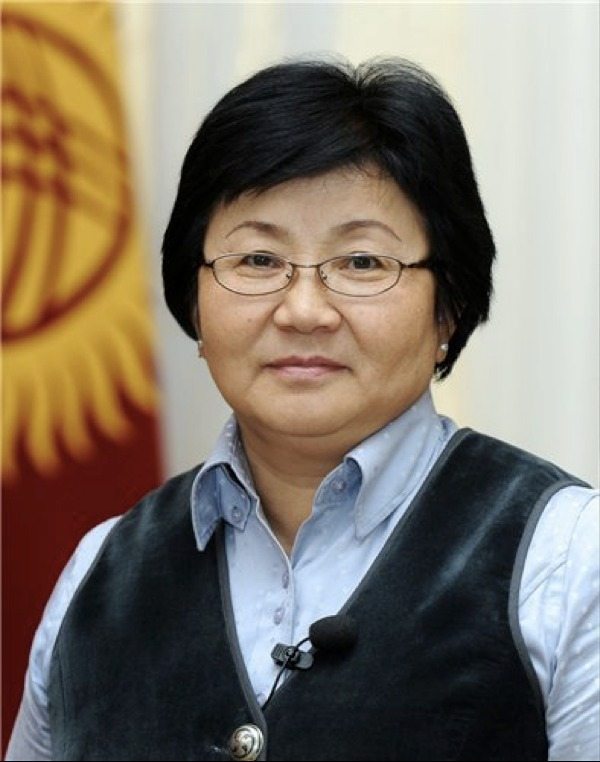
Roza Otunbayeva, President of Kyrgyzstan

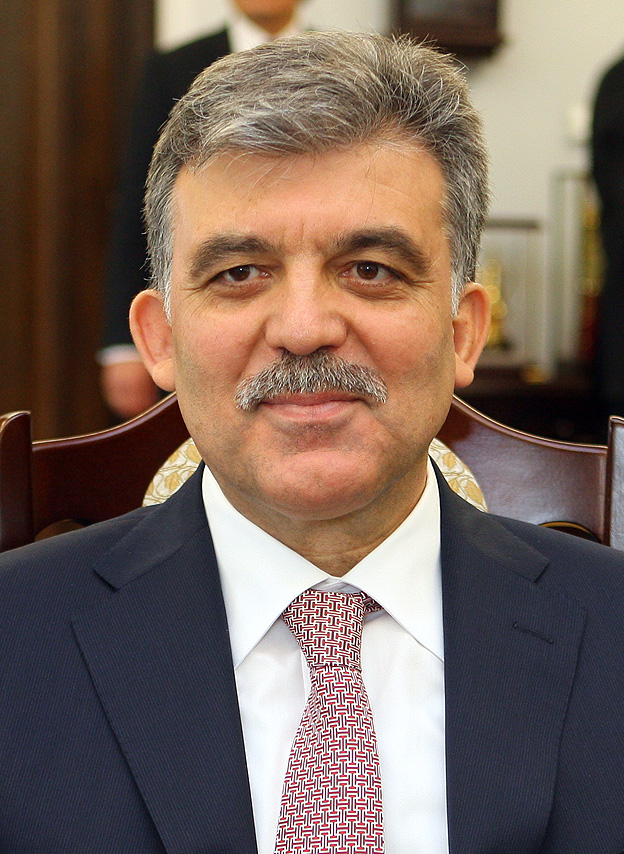
Abdullah Gül, President of Turkey (host)

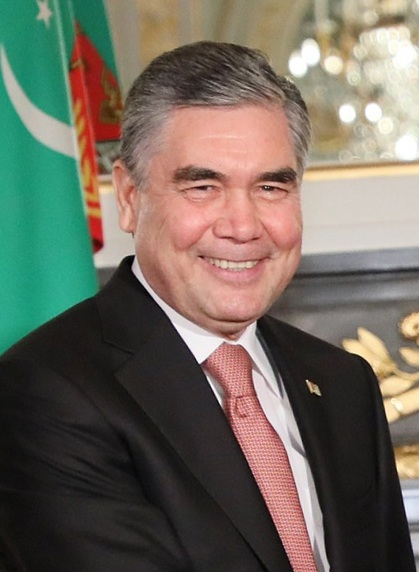
Gurbanguly Berdimuhamedow, Former President of Turkmenistan
