= 1991 Kyrgyz presidential election =

- 13 October 1991
- Registered: 2,319,780
- Turnout: 89.02%
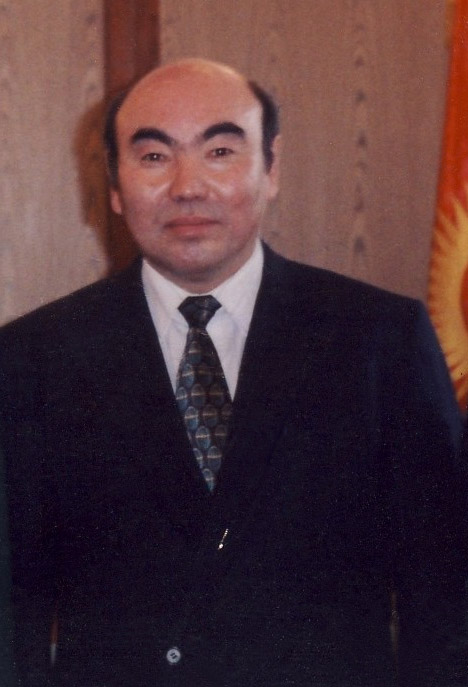
Candidate	Askar Akayev
Party	Independent
Popular vote	1,968,781
Percentage	95.39%
- Results by region
President before election
Askar Akayev
Independent
Elected President
Askar Akayev
Independent

Presidential elections were held for the first time in Kyrgyzstan on 13 October 1991. The only candidate was Askar Akayev, who received 95% of the vote. Voter turnout reported to be 89%.

== Results ==
Candidate	Party	Votes	%
Askar Akayev	Independent	1,968,781	95.39
Against		95,202	4.61
Total		2,063,983	100.00
Valid votes		2,063,983	99.95
Invalid/blank votes		1,098	0.05
Total votes		2,065,081	100.00
Registered voters/turnout		2,319,780	89.02
Source: Nohlen et al. (Note: The total number of votes reported by the electoral commission was 2,065,318, which would give a voter turnout of 89.03%.)
