= 1995 Kyrgyz presidential election =

- 24 December 1995
- Registered: 2,254,348
- Turnout: 86.19% (▼2.83pp)
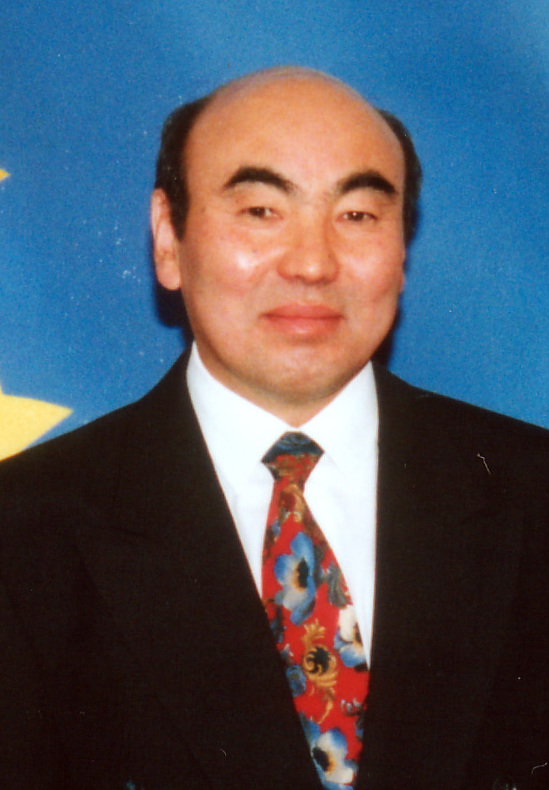

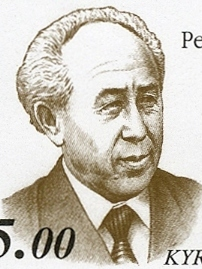
Nominee	Askar Akayev	Absamat Masaliyev
Party	NPK–DPZh	KKP
Popular vote	1,391,114	474,547
Percentage	72.45%	24.71%
- Results by region
President before election
Askar Akayev
Independent
Elected President
Askar Akayev
Independent

Presidential elections were held in Kyrgyzstan on 24 December 1995. The result was a victory for incumbent President Askar Akayev, who received 72% of the vote. Voter turnout was reported to be 86%. These were the first presidential elections in Kyrgyzstan since independence.

== Candidates ==
Three candidates appeared on the ballot. Askar Akayev, the incumbent, was widely favored to win. His campaign emphasized job creation and infrastructure modernization. He was most popular in the north, where he is from, and among the Russian minority. His main opponent was Absamat Masaliyev, the former leader of communist Kyrgyzstan. He opposed Akayev's reforms, especially land privatization, and advocated a return to a more Soviet-style economy. His base of support was in the south, but his platform was widely unpopular among the Kyrgyz people. The third candidate was Medetkan Sherimkulov, who supported a more moderate left-wing program, including free healthcare and education. However, his support of removing Russian as a state language alienated him from the Russian-speaking minority.

== Results ==
Candidate	Party	Votes	%
Askar Akayev	NPK–DPZh	1,391,114	72.45
Absamat Masaliyev	Party of Communists	474,547	24.71
Medetkan Sherimkulov	Independent	33,499	1.74
Against all		21,063	1.10
Total		1,920,223	100.00
Valid votes		1,920,223	98.82
Invalid/blank votes		22,854	1.18
Total votes		1,943,077	100.00
Registered voters/turnout		2,254,348	86.19
Source: Nohlen et al.
