= Askar Akayev =

President of Kyrgyzstan from 1990 to 2005

- Аскар Акаев
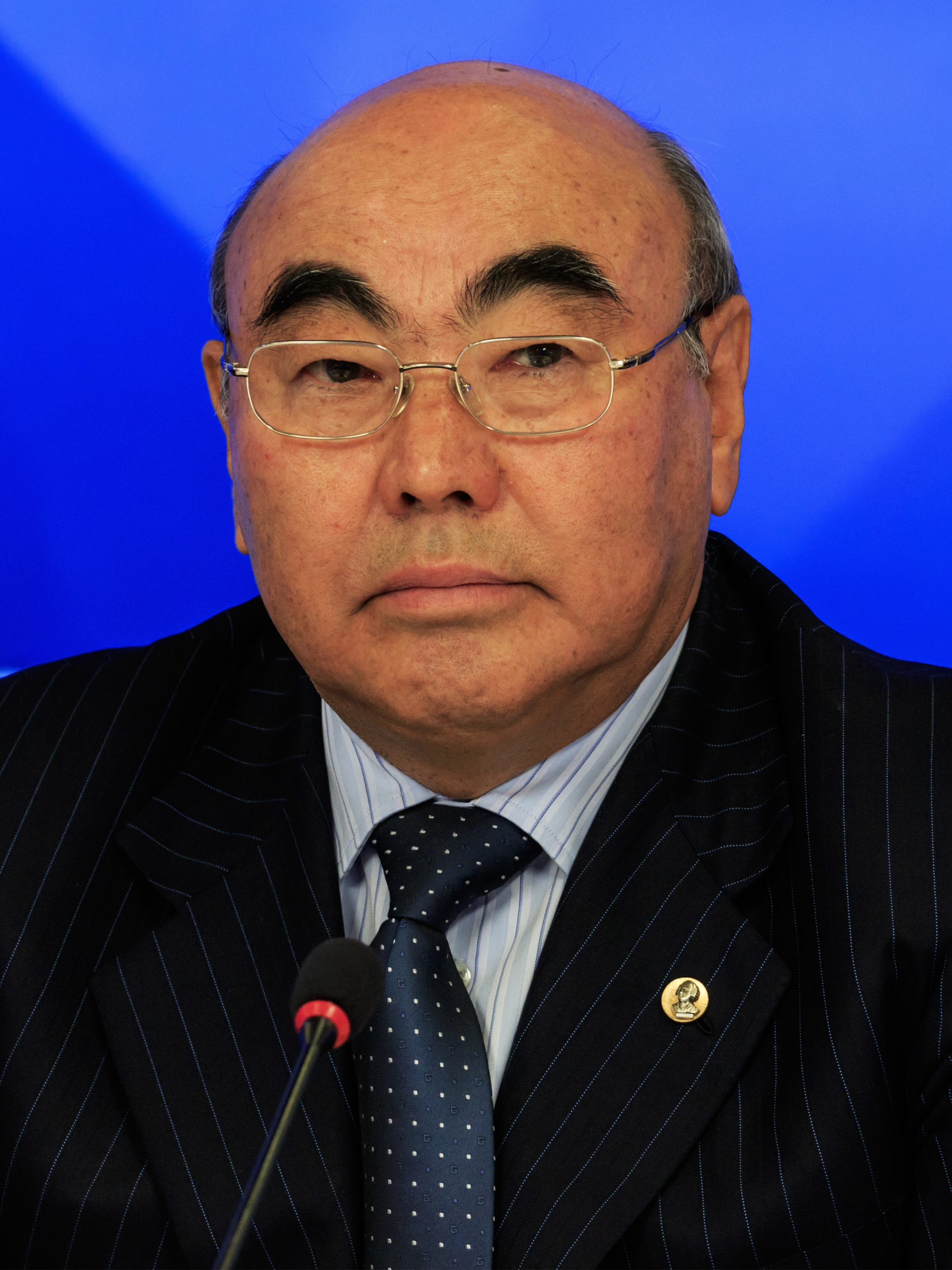
- Akayev in 2016

1st President of Kyrgyzstan
- In office KSSR: 27 October 1990 – 31 August 1991; Independent Kyrgyzstan: 31 August 1991 – 24 March 2005
- Prime Minister: Nasirdin Isanov; Andrei Iordan (acting); Tursunbek Chyngyshev; Almanbet Matubraimov (acting); Apas Jumagulov; Kubanychbek Jumaliyev; Boris Silayev (acting); Jumabek Ibraimov; Boris Silayev (acting); Amangeldy Muraliyev; Kurmanbek Bakiyev; Nikolai Tanayev
- Vice President: Nasirdin Isanov; German Kuznetsov; Feliks Kulov
- Preceded by: Position established
- Succeeded by: Ishenbai Kadyrbekov (Acting)

Personal details
- Born: 10 November 1944 (age 81) Kyzyl-Bayrak, Kirghiz SSR, Soviet Union (now Kyrgyzstan)
- Party: Independent; Forward Kyrgyzstan Party (affiliated)
- Spouse: Mayram Akayeva
- Children: 4, including Bermet and Aidar
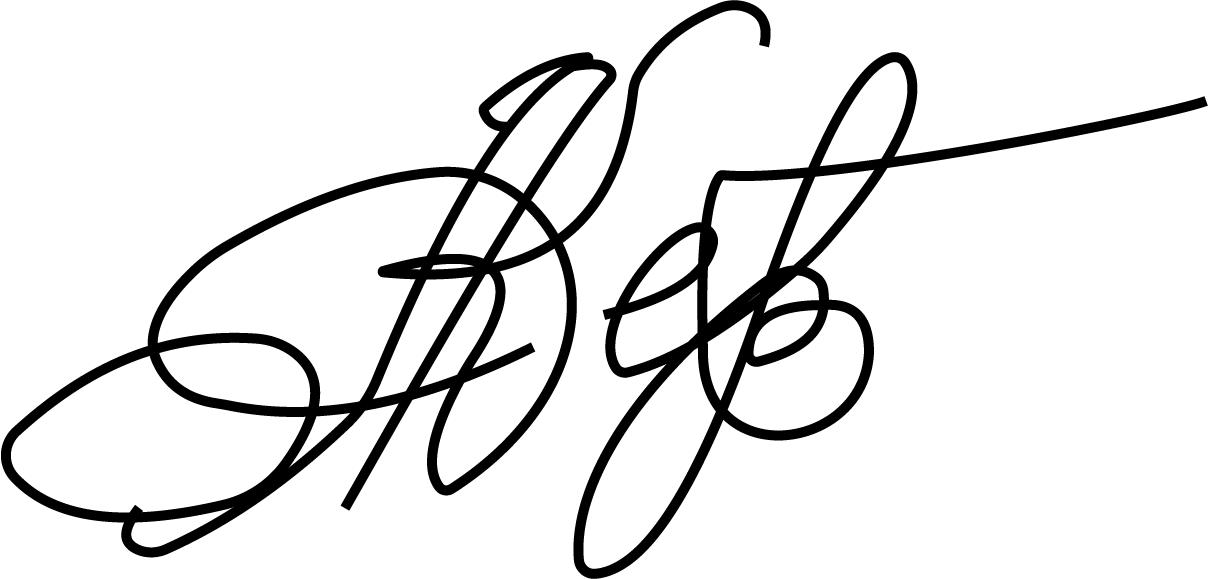
- Signature

Askar Akayevich Akayev (Kyrgyz: Аскар Акай уулу Акаев, IPA: [ɑsˈqɑr ɑˌχɑj‿uːˈɫʊ ɑˈχajɪf]; born 10 November 1944) is a Kyrgyz former politician who served as President of Kyrgyzstan from 1990 until being overthrown in the March 2005 Tulip Revolution.

Akayev became president of Kyrgyzstan in 1990, a year before the Fall of the Soviet Union, and he remained in his post after Kyrgyzstan became independent. Initially a communist, Akayev promoted privatization in Kyrgyzstan during his presidency.

While Kyrgyzstan under his rule was less authoritarian than the other Central Asian states, Akayev still ruled an authoritarian regime. He was re-elected twice in elections widely considered rigged, and faced numerous protests against his rule during the early 2000s.

In 2005, fears Akayev would try staying in power by having a relative or ally be elected in his place led to the Tulip Revolution, culminating in Akayev fleeing to Moscow.

== Education and academic career ==
Akayev was born in Kyzyl-Bayrak, Kirghiz Soviet Socialist Republic. He was the eldest of five sons born into a family of collective farm workers. He became a metalworker at a local factory in 1961. He subsequently moved to Leningrad, where he trained as a physicist and graduated from the Leningrad Institute of Precision Mechanics and Optics in 1967 with an honors degree in mathematics, engineering and computer science. He stayed at the institute until 1976, working as a senior researcher and teacher. In Leningrad he met, and in 1970, married Mayram Akayeva with whom he now has two sons and two daughters. They returned to their native Kyrgyzstan in 1977, where he became a senior professor at the Frunze Polytechnic Institute. Some of his later cabinet members were former students and friends from his academic years.

He obtained a doctorate in 1981 from the Moscow Institute of Engineering and Physics, having written his dissertation on holographic systems of storage and transformation of information. In 1984, he became a member of the Kyrgyz Academy of Sciences, rose to vice president of the academy in 1987 and then president of the academy in 1989. He was elected as a deputy in the Supreme Soviet of the USSR in the same year.

== Early political career ==
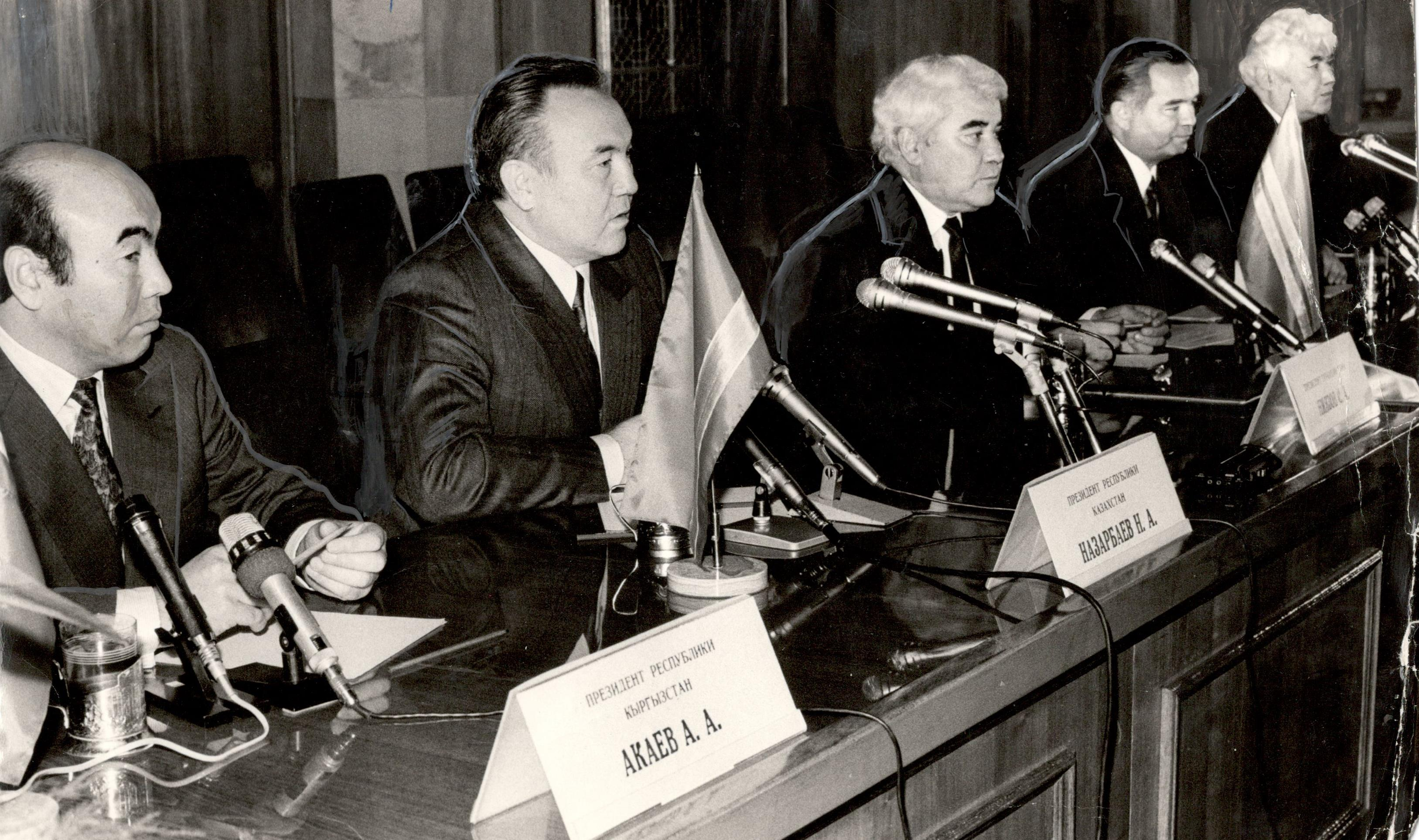
Akayev, Nursultan Nazarbayev, Saparmurat Niyazov, Islam Karimov and Rahmon Nabiyev during the CIS meeting c. 1991

On 25 October 1990, the Kirghiz SSR's Supreme Soviet held elections for the newly created post of president of the republic. Two candidates contested the presidency, President of the Council of Ministers of Kirghiz SSR, Apas Jumagulov, and First Secretary of the Communist Party of the Kirghiz SSR, Absamat Masaliyev. However, neither Jumagulov nor Masaliyev received a majority of the votes cast. In accordance with the Kirghiz SSR's constitution of 1978, both candidates were disqualified and neither could run in the second round of voting.

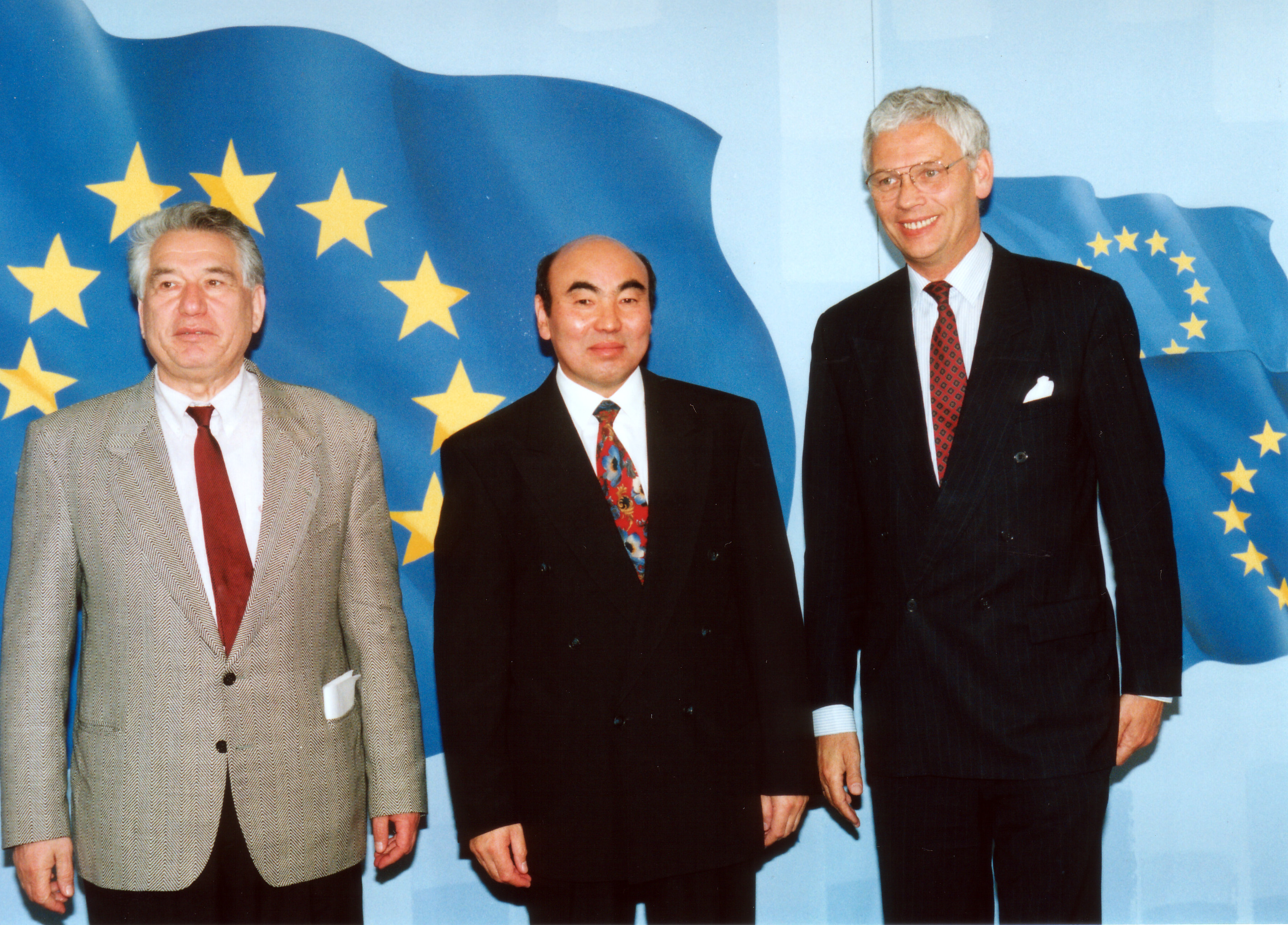
Visit of Askar Akayev, President of Kyrgyzstan, to the EC in 1994

Two days later, on 27 October, the Supreme Soviet selected Akayev who was effectively a compromise candidate to serve as the republic's first president. In 1991, he was offered the post of vice-president of the Soviet Union by President Mikhail Gorbachev, but refused. Akayev was elected president of the renamed Republic of Kyrgyzstan in an uncontested poll on 12 October 1991. He was reelected twice, amid allegations of ballot rigging, on 24 December 1995 and 29 October 2000.

== Presidency (1990-2005) ==
Akayev was initially seen as an economically right-wing liberal leader. He commented in a 1991 interview that "Although I am a Communist, my basic attitude toward private property is favorable. I believe that the revolution in the sphere of economics was not made by Karl Marx but by Adam Smith." As late as 1993 political analysts saw Akayev as a "prodemocratic physicist." He actively promoted privatization of land and other economic assets and operated a relatively liberal regime compared with the governments of the other Central Asian nations. In October 1991, he appointed Boris Birshtein, who is associated with the Zürich-based Seabeco AG, as president of the country's committee for reconstruction and development as well as the country's trade representative and ensured that the Kirgiz branch of Seabeco would operate free of taxes. (Note: According to the KGB colonel Leonid Veselovsky (Russian: Леонид Веселовский), Veselovsky met Birshtein in early 1991, became Seabeco's and Birshtein's lobbyist to senior Soviet officials and subsequently both Seabeco and Birshtein gained financially as a friendly firm to Moscow, Moldova, and Kyrgyzstan. Birshtein was with Nasirdin Isanov when died. Veselovsky supported the Soviet Union Communist Party's deputy general secretary Vladimir Ivashko's plan to greatly increase the number of joint ventures using the USSR Communist Party networks in order to hide its assets. According to the Swiss chartered accountant Rudolf Studhalter who supports Veselovsky, Seabeco, which allegedly has close ties to Russian mafia, and numerous Russians and is the father of Alexander Studhalter who is the founder of the 1996 established Lucerne based Swiru Holding AG which is an abbreviation for Switzerland and Russia, had traded personal computers with the Soviet Union during the 1980s, was a major shareholder of Gazprom when it was undervalued and, since 1996, is a business associate of Suleyman Kerimov, Veselovsky "seems to be for real -- he comes with money with a government stamp." Tursunbek Chyngyshev resigned after the Seabeco gold scandal which allegedly involved Centerra Gold and Cameco.) He was granted lifelong immunity from prosecution by the Lower House of Parliament in 2003.

Akayev was supportive of the Kyrgyzstani Neo-Tengrist movement.

=== Protests ===
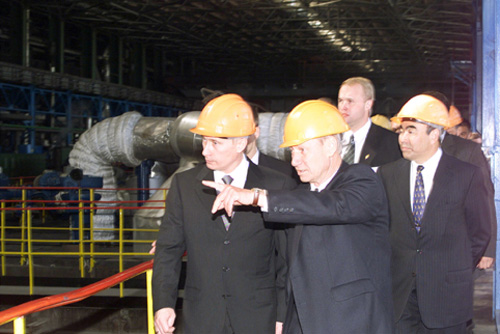
Vladimir Putin with Askar Akayev at the Bishkek Heating and Electricity Station, October 2000

The first wave of demonstrations took place in mid-March 2002. Azimbek Beknazarov, a member of parliament accused of abuse of power, was due to attend trial taking place in Jalal-Abad. Over 2,000 demonstrators marched on the town where the proceedings were to take place. According to eyewitnesses, police ordered the demonstrators to stop and gave them fifteen minutes to disperse, yet opened fire before this time elapsed. Five men were shot dead; another was killed on the next day. 61 people were injured, including 47 police and 14 civilians.

Riot police clashed with protesters in Bishkek in May during demonstrations in support of Beknazarov. Police in the capital's Parliament square kicked protesters and dragged people away to break up the 200-strong crowd. They made several demands including the resignation of Akayev. This was again repeated in November of the same year when scores were arrested as the opposition marched on the capital. Protests continued, albeit on a smaller scale, at various points over the next few years.

=== 2005 election controversy ===
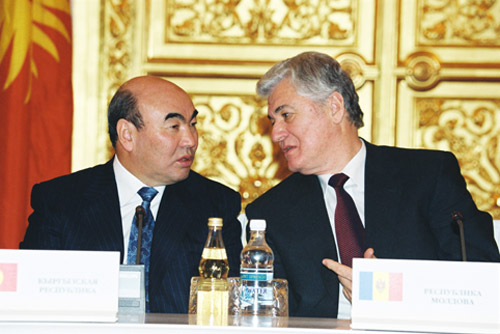
Akayev with Moldovan President Vladimir Voronin in Moscow, 2001

Akayev had promised to step down from office when his third term expired in 2005, but the possibility of a dynastical succession had been raised. His son Aidar Akayev and his daughter Bermet Akayeva were candidates in the 2005 legislative election, and it was widely suspected that he was going to retain either de facto power by arranging for the election of a close supporter or relative, or perhaps even by abrogation of the term limit provision in the constitution and remaining in power personally, an allegation which he strongly denied.

The results of the elections were disputed, with allegations of vote-rigging. Two of Akayev's children won seats. Serious protests broke out in Osh and Jalal-Abad, with protesters occupying administration buildings and the Osh airport. The government declared that it was ready to negotiate with the demonstrators. However an opposition leader said talks would only be worthwhile if the President himself took part.

Akayev refused to resign, but pledged not to use force to end the protests, which he attributed to foreign interests seeking to provoke a large-scale clamp-down in response.

On 23 March, Akayev announced the dismissal of Interior Minister Bakirdin Subanbekov and General Prosecutor Myktybek Abdyldayev for "poor work" in dealing with the growing protests.

=== Downfall ===
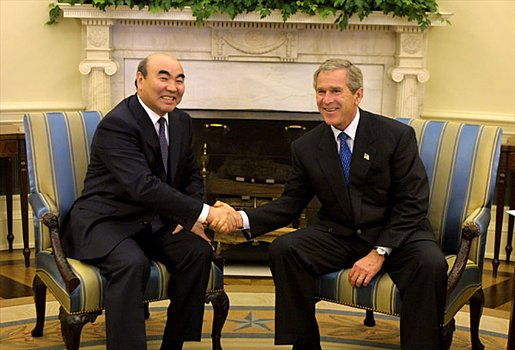
George W. Bush with Askar Akayev in the Oval Office on September 23, 2002

On 24 March 2005, protesters stormed the presidential compound in the central square of Bishkek and seized control of the seat of state power after clashing with riot police during a large opposition rally. Opposition supporters also seized control of key cities and towns in the south to press demands that Akayev step down.

That day, Akayev fled the country with his family, reportedly escaping first to Kazakhstan and then to Russia. Russian president Vladimir Putin invited Akayev to stay in Russia. There were early reports that he had tendered his resignation to opposition leaders before his departure. However, his formal resignation did not come until 4 April, when a delegation of members of parliament from Kyrgyzstan met him in Russia.

The Kyrgyz Parliament accepted the resignation on 11 April 2005, after stripping him and his family members of special privileges that had been granted to him by the previous parliament. He was also formally stripped of the title of "First President of Kyrgyzstan".

== Current position and activities ==
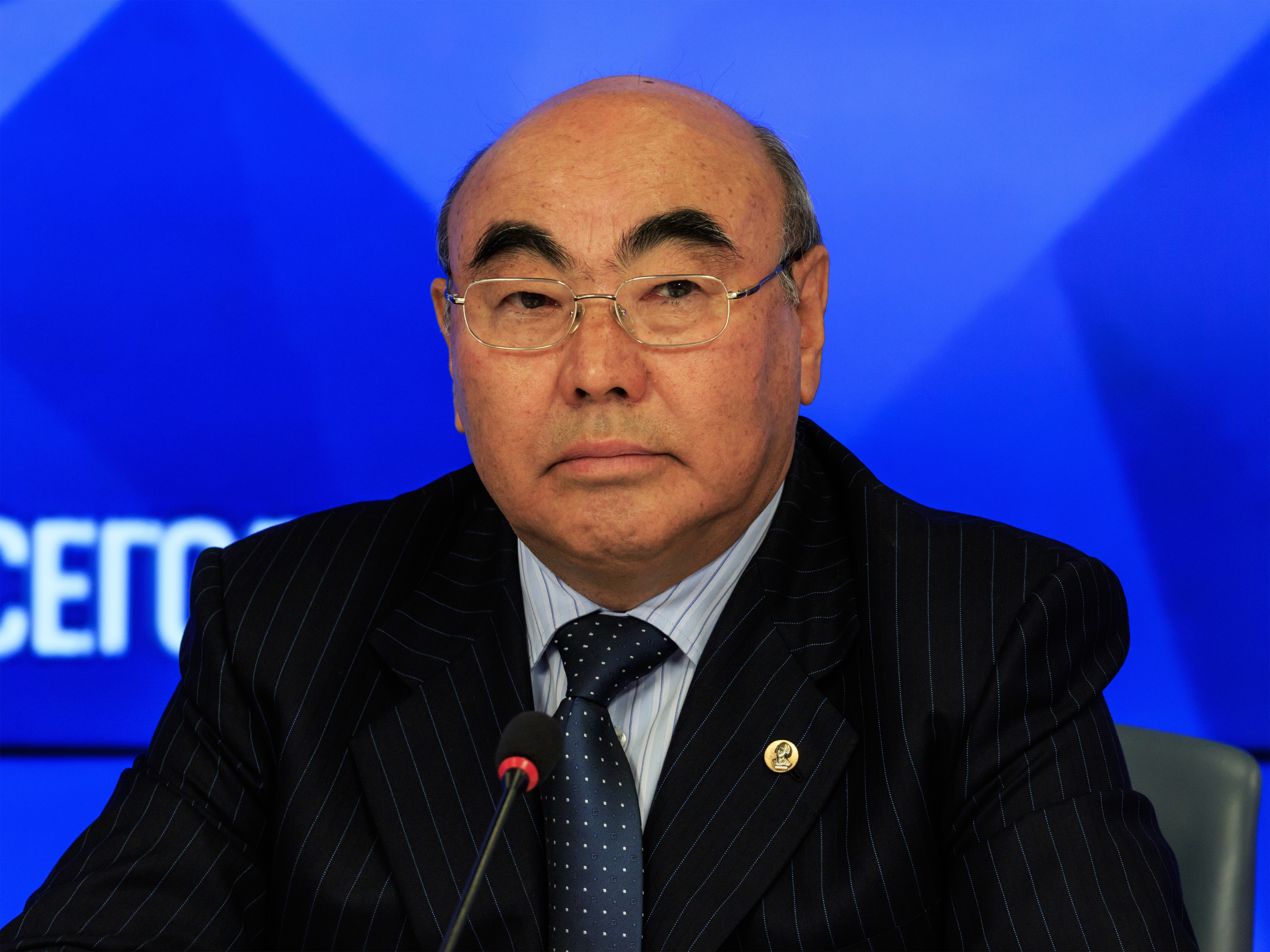
Akayev in Moscow, 2016

Akayev now works as Professor and Senior Researcher of Prigogine Institute for Mathematical Investigations of Complex Systems at Moscow State University. Together with Andrey Korotayev and George Malinetsky he is a coordinator of the Russian Academy of Sciences Program "System Analysis and Mathematical Modeling of World Dynamics". He is also Academic Supervisor of the Centre for Stability and Risk Analysis at the HSE University in Moscow.

In July 2021, Akayev was put on a wanted list for his involvement in operations at the Kumtor Gold Mine. The following month, Akayev returned to Bishkek for the first time in 16 years in order to cooperate with the investigation, expressing his appreciation to President Sadyr Japarov for allowing him to return. In December 2021, the criminal prosecution was discontinued.

In the 2022 Kyrgyzstan–Tajikistan clashes, Akayev commented on Tajikistan's invasion of Kyrgyz territory. Accusing Emomali Rahmon of a carefully planned and pre-planned act of aggression, Akaev called Rahmon ungrateful and recalled that 30 years ago, during the civil war in Tajikistan, Kyrgyzstan provided "the greatest help and political, moral and humanitarian support to the brotherly people of Tajikistan."

In August 2023, Akaev, in an interview with the Russian television channel RT, stated that Kyrgyzstan "should support Russia" in the invasion of Ukraine. So he answered the journalist's question about the fact that citizens who participated in the hostilities in Ukraine on the side of Russia were convicted in Kyrgyzstan, and what Akaev thinks about this. “I didn't understand the details of this, but I want to say that Kyrgyzstan, as an ally of Russia, and as a member of the Eurasian Economic Union, and a member of the CSTO, of course, must support Russia. And Russia needs it today. It is in such difficult days that an ally is known,” he said.

== Political positions ==
Askar Akayev embraced free market reforms and embraced nationalism.

== Electoral history ==
Electoral history of Askar Akayev
Year	Office	Party	Votes received				Result
Year	Office	Party	Total	%	P.	Swing	Result
1991	President of Kyrgyzstan	Independent	1,968,781	95.39%	1st	—N/a	Unopposed
1995	President of Kyrgyzstan	NPK–DPZh	1,391,114	72.45%	1st	-22.94	Won
2000	President of Kyrgyzstan	Independent	1,460,201	76.36%	1st	+3.91	Won

== Honours ==
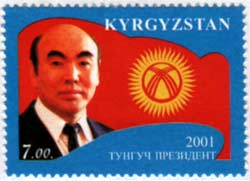
Akayev on a Kyrgyzstani stamp

=== Foreign honours ===
- Slovakia: Grand Cross (or 1st Class) of the Order of the White Double Cross (2003)
- In 2012 he was awarded with the Gold Kondratieff Medal by the International N. D. Kondratieff Foundation.
- Kazakhstan: Order of Dostyk (2001)

== Publications ==
- Когерентные оптические вычислительные машины (в соавт., Ленинград, 1977).
- Оптические методы обработки информации (в соавт., М., 1983).
- Holographic Memory. New York, NY: Allerton Press, 1997.
- Избранные лекции по оптическим компьютерам. Бишкек, 1996.
- Рельефография. Бишкек, 1996.
- Переходная экономика глазами физика (математическая модель переходной экономики). Бишкек: Учкун, 2000.
- Думая о будущем с оптимизмом: Размышления о внешней политике и мироустройстве. М.: Международные отношения, 2004.
- Современный финансово-экономический кризис в свете теории инновационно-технологического развития экономики и управления инновационным процессом // Системный мониторинг. Глобальное и региональное развитие. М.: Editorial URSS, 2009. ISBN 978-5-397-00917-1. С. 141–162.
- О новой методологии долгосрочного циклического прогнозирования динамики развития мировой системы и России // Прогноз и моделирование кризисов и мировой динамики. — М.: ЛИБРОКОМ, 2009. С. 5-69.
- Log-Periodic Oscillation Analysis Forecasts the Burst of the «Gold Bubble» // Structure and Dynamics 4/3 (2010): 1-11 (with Alexey Fomin, Sergey Tsirel, and Andrey Korotayev).
- Моделирование и прогнозирование мировой динамики. М.: ИСПИ РАН, 2012. ISBN 978-5-7556-0456-7
- On the dynamics of the world demographic transition and financial-economic crises forecasts // The European Physical Journal 205, 355-373 (2012) (with Viktor Sadovnichy & Andrey Korotayev).
- Global Inflation Dynamics: regularities & forecasts // Structure and Dynamics 5/3 (2012): 1-15 (with Andrey Korotayev and Alexey Fomin).
- Technological development and protest waves: Arab spring as a trigger of the global phase transition // Technological Forecasting & Social Change 116 (2017): 316–321 (with Andrey Korotayev).

== See also ==
- Politics of Kyrgyzstan

== Notes ==
Political offices
Preceded by Position created	President of Kyrgyzstan; 1990 – 2005	Succeeded by Ishenbai Kadyrbekov; Acting
