= Zamira Sydykova =

Kyrgyzstani diplomat (born 1960)

- Замира Сыдыкова
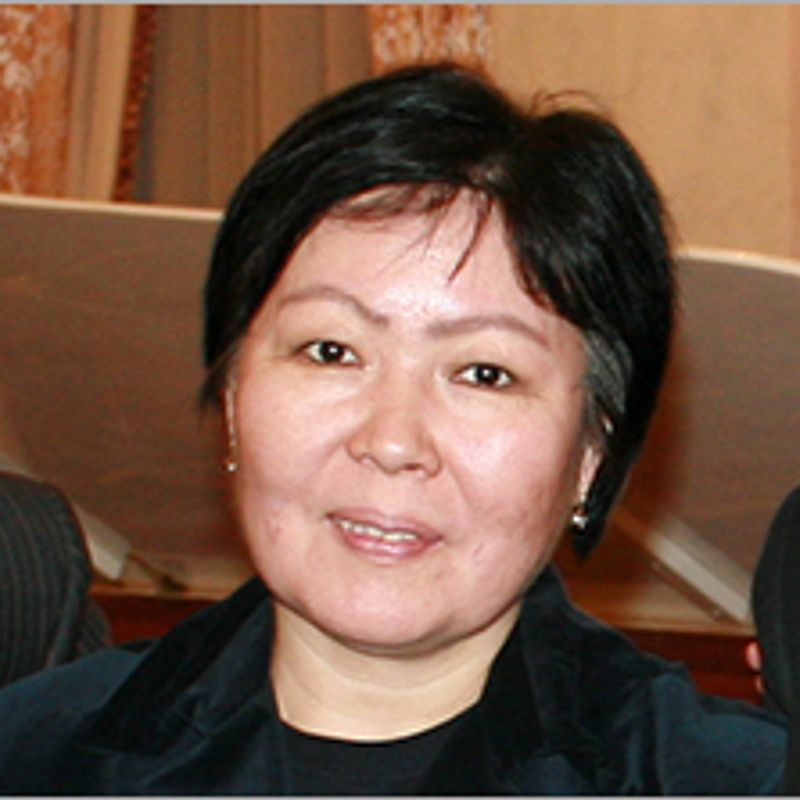

3rd Ambassador of Kyrgyzstan to the United States and Canada
- In office June 2005 – April 2010
- President: Kurmanbek Bakiyev
- Prime Minister: Medetbek Kerimkulov; Felix Kulov; Azim Isabekov; Almazbek Atambayev; Iskenderbek Aidaraliyev; Igor Chudinov; Daniar Usenov
- Preceded by: Baktybek Abdrisaev
- Succeeded by: Muktar Djumaliev

Personal details
- Born: 23 November 1960 (age 65) Frunze, Soviet Union (now Bishkek, Kyrgyzstan)
- Education: Moscow State University Kyrgyz National University

Zamira Sydykova (Kyrgyz and Russian: Замира Сыдыкова; born 1960) served as Kyrgyz ambassador to the United States and Canada from 2005 to 2010, after a career as an opposition journalist, including imprisonment by the government of then-president Askar Akayev. After the Kyrgyz Revolution of 2010, Ambassador Sydykova served as a trade advisor, scholar at the Kennan Institute of the Woodrow Wilson International Center for Scholars, associate with Carnegie Endowment, as well as resumed her editorship of Res Publica. Ambassador Sydykova has received awards from the International Women's Media Foundation, Human Rights Watch, and Amnesty International.

== Early life and education ==
Sydykova was born in Frunze (now Bishkek), the capital of Kyrgyzstan in 1960. Sydykova has a Master’s of Science in Journalism from Moscow State University (1986) and a Bachelor of Arts in Linguistics and Literature from Kyrgyz National University (1981).

== Teaching and journalism ==
After graduating in 1986, Sydykova taught journalism at the Kyrgyz National University.

In 1988, Sydykova became working a reporter for the popular newspaper, Komsomolets Kirgizii, the local organ of the Soviet communist party's youth wing, Komsomol.

In 1992, after Kyrgyzstan became independent, she founded the country's first independent newspaper, Res Publica ("Republic") and as editor-in-chief she struggled to promote freedom of the press and the concept of an open society.

The government’s campaign to shut down Res Publica began in 1993. In 1995, Sydykova was charged with slandering President Askar Akayev for reporting on his foreign bank accounts. As a result, she was banned from working as a journalist for 18 months. In 1997, she was charged with criminal libel for publishing articles alleging corruption in a state-run gold mining company. After three months in a labor camp, she was released, but was banned from working for another 18 months. In 2000, Res Publica and Sydykova were again found guilty of libel. The resulting fines equaled the annual budget of the paper. Res Publica was forced to close for several months. A financial award from the International Women’s Media Foundation, the Courage in Journalism Award, allowed Sydykova to resume publishing.

When Sydykova received the award, Richard Parsons (businessman), then president of Time Warner remarked

"The fate of Res Publica involves the fate of Kyrgyzstan, but it doesn't end there. I think we have to be clear about this point. The always dangerous often lonely struggle of journalists like Zamira Sydykova belongs to anyone who believes that our destiny is tied to securing the basic human rights of people everywhere, whoever they are."

.

== Tulip Revolution and ambassador ==
After the Tulip Revolution overthrew Akayev, President Kurmanbek Bakiyev appointed Sydykova as Ambassador of the Kyrgyz Republic to the USA and Canada. During her five-year tenure, Sydykova steered policy between Kyrgyzstan and the US while Kyrgyzstan was an important ally in the War in Afghanistan, serving as a major hub for troops and materiel in and out of the region. Sydykova worked with leading politicians and officials as President George W. Bush, President Barack Obama, Secretary of State Condoleezza Rice and Hillary Clinton. In addition, Sydykova kept Kyrgyzstan on the agenda for multilateral institutions, US Congress, the Canadian government, business organizations, and cultural groups. Sydykova’s accomplishments during her ambassadorship include:

- Representing the Kyrgyz Government to the governments of the US and Canada and all of international organizations locally based (the United Nations, the World Bank, USAID, IMF, etc.), and the US Congress.
- Testified before the Commission on Security and Cooperation in Europe/Helsinki Commission (Sen. Ben Cardin, D-MD ranking member) on Kyrgyzstan's Revolution: Causes and Consequences
- Creating the Central Asian Caucus of the US House of Representatives.
- Promoting political, cultural, economic and business ties between the US/Canada and Central Asia.
- Assisting in the formulation of Kyrgyzstan’s international policy
- Negotiating the Transit Center at Manas Agreement
- Promoting awareness in the US and Canada of Central and South Asian business and cultural opportunities.
- Organizing and coordinating official and working visits of US, Canadian and Kyrgyz officials
- Meetings with top government officials to secure US Government support for issues vital to the new democracy in the Kyrgyzstan
- Spearheading the creation of the Kyrgyz-North American Trade Council for the purpose of promoting cross-border trade and investment.
- Giving talks and speeches at local NGOs, think-tanks and universities on issues pertaining to democratic development and women’s rights in the region
- Providing intercultural advice to both North American and Kyrgyz officials and dignitaries.
- Promoting international adoption from the Kyrgyz Republic and assisting US and Canadian families to expedite the adoption process
- Helping interfaith organizations and churches register in the Kyrgyz Republic

After the Kyrgyz Revolution of 2010, Sydykova was replaced as ambassador.

== Post ambassador career ==
In 2010 Sydykova received a fellowship from the Woodrow Wilson Center, and was an associate on the Al-Farabi Carnegie Program on Central Asia (with the Carnegie Endowment). In addition, Sydykova served as Senior Advisor to Discovering Eurasia (where she worked on projects with Supreme Fuel and Theodore Willi Inc.), and consultant to Hussar & Co. and Adilet. In 2015, Sydykova once again became Editor-in-Chief of Res Publica.

== Publications ==
- Democracy á la Kyrgyz: Behind the Scenes (Bishkek, 1997)
- Hopes and Losses: Times of Change (2004)
- Revolutions Have a Beginning, Revolutions Have No End (2011)

== Honors and awards ==
- Courage in Journalism Award of the International Women's Media Foundation (2000)
- Recipient of the Human Rights Watch Award (2000)
- Recipient of Amnesty International Award (1997)

Sydykova is or has been a member of:

- Mountains Institute, Washington, DC
- Women's Foreign Policy Group, Washington DC
- Eurasia Initiative, New York
- Kyrgyz-North American Trade Council, New York
- Board of Advisors of the Virginia International University

== See also ==
- Tulip Revolution
- 2010 Kyrgyzstani uprising
