= United Front for a Worthy Future for Kyrgyzstan =

The United Front For A Worthy Future For Kyrgyzstan (UFFWFK) is an alliance of political parties making up the largest political opposition organization in Kyrgyzstan. Former Prime Minister Felix Kulov leads the organization and Azamat Kalman is the party's spokesperson.

Politicians opposed to President Kurmanbek Bakiyev's policies formed the alliance on 27 February 2007.

Azamat Kalman, the party's spokesperson, said in mid-March 2007: "protest rallies will start in the provinces on April 9 and the same rallies will start in the Kyrgyz capital, Bishkek, on April 11." The protests ended after clashes erupted on April 19 between protesters and the police; according to the former, the clashes were the work of provocateurs. Kulov was questioned by the police regarding the clashes; in August, he was charged with creating public disorder.

On March 12, the United Front released a statement of opposition to "corrupt clan government, the seizure of property by the ruling family, the establishment of control over profitable sectors of the economy, and pressure on private businesses and the mass media."
