= 2010 Kyrgyz Revolution =

Revolution that overthrew President Kurmanbek Bakiyev

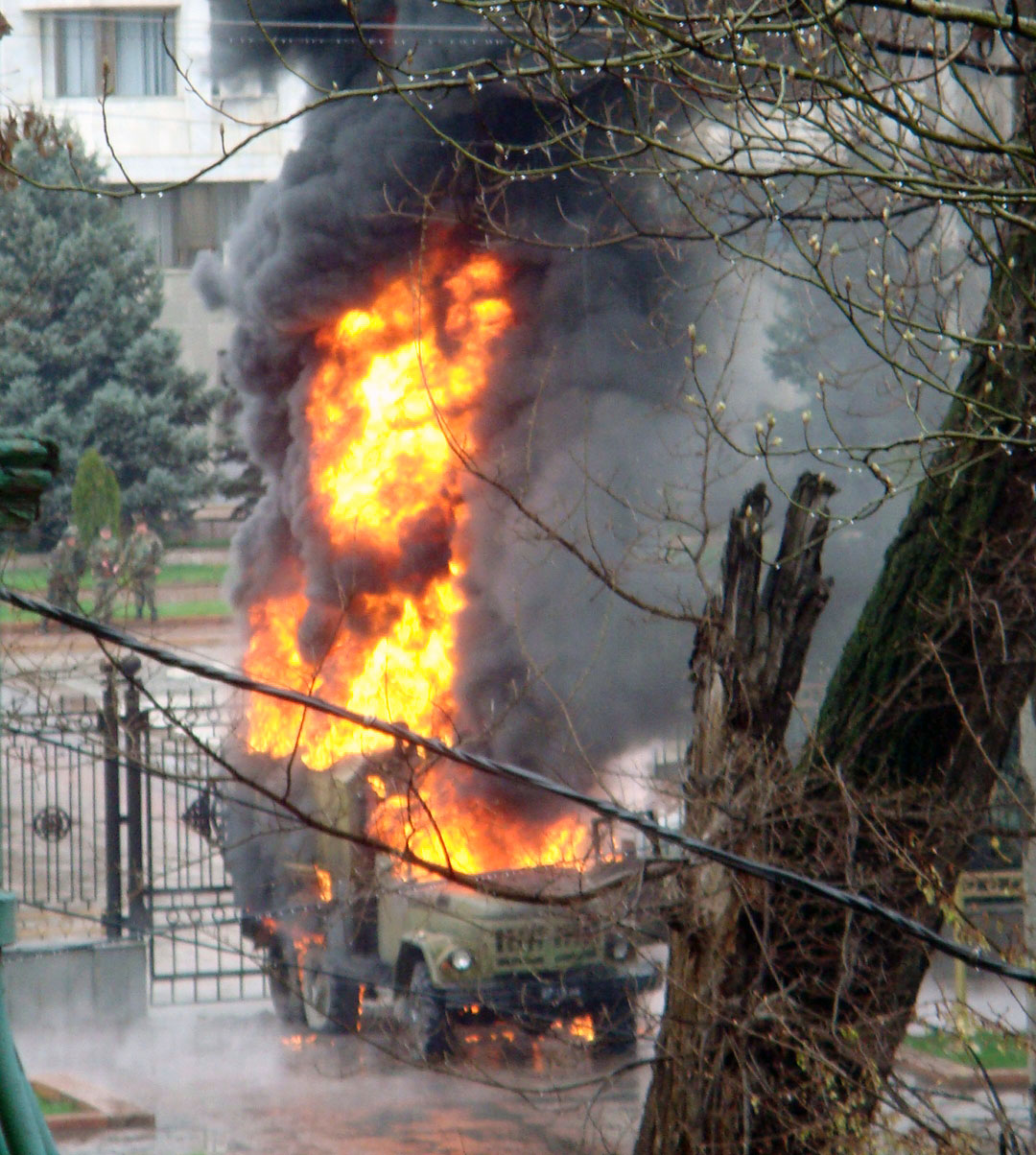
- An opposition-captured vehicle burns near the capitol building during citywide protests and riots in Bishkek, Kyrgyzstan on 7 April 2010. Guards can be seen to the left of the smoke.
- Date: 6–15 April 2010 (1 week and 2 days)
- Location: Kyrgyzstan
- Caused by: Authoritarianism; Economic and energy crises
- Methods: Protests, riots
- Result: Democratization of Kyrgyzstan: Resignation of president Kurmanbek Bakiyev and his government; Governmental shift from presidentialism to parliamentarism; Early parliamentary elections held on 10 October 2010

Parties
SDPK; Respublika; Ata-Meken; Ar-Namys; Ata-Zhurt; United Kyrgyzstan	Government of Kyrgyzstan; Armed Forces; Ministry of the Interior; State Committee for National Security; Ak Jol

Lead figures
Roza Otunbayeva; Almazbek Atambayev; Ömürbek Babanov; Bolot Sher-Niyaz; Koisun Kurmanalieva; Sheraly Abdyldaev; Felix Kulov; Kamchybek Tashiev; Adakhan Madumarov	Kurmanbek Bakiyev; Moldomusa Kongantiyev; Murat Sutalinov

Number
~5,000 protesters	

Casualties and losses
118 dead, 400 injured	3 dead, 111 injured

Casualties
- Deaths: ~2,000
- Injuries: 1,500+
- Arrested: 97 arrested

The 2010 Kyrgyz Revolution, also known as the Second Kyrgyz Revolution, the Melon Revolution, the April Events, (Note: Kyrgyz: Апрель окуясы, romanized: Aprel okuiasy, pronounced [apˈɾel oqʊjɑˈsɯ]) or officially as the People's April Revolution (Kyrgyz: Апрель Элдик революциясы, romanized: Aprel Yeldik revolyutsiyasy), began in April 2010 with the ousting of Kyrgyz president Kurmanbek Bakiyev in the capital Bishkek. It was followed by increased ethnic tension involving Kyrgyz people and Uzbeks in the south of the country, which escalated in June 2010. The violence ultimately led to the consolidation of a new parliamentary system in Kyrgyzstan.

During the general mayhem, exiles from the Uzbek minority claim they were assaulted and driven to Uzbekistan, with some 400,000 Kyrgyzstani citizens becoming internally displaced. Victims interviewed by media and aid workers testify to mass killing, gang rape and torture. Then-head of the Interim government Roza Otunbayeva indicated that the death toll is tenfold higher than was previously reported, which brings the number of the dead to 2,000 people.

== Background ==
=== Domestic policy ===
During the winter of 2009–2010, Kyrgyzstan suffered from rolling blackouts and cutoffs occurring regularly while energy prices rose.

In January 2010, Kyrgyzstan sent a delegation to China to discuss improved economic relations. Kyrgyzstan national electric company Natsionalnaya electricheskaya syet and the Chinese Tebian Electric signed a $342 million contract to build the Datka-Kemin 500 kV power transmission lines. This would have reduced Kyrgyzstan's dependence on the Central Asian power systems and energy dependence on Russia. The delegation was led by then President Bakiyev's son.

In February 2010, Kyrgyzstan proposed raising energy tariffs. Heating costs were reportedly going to rise 400% and electricity by 170%. Long-term frustration was building in Kyrgyzstan over the perceived corruption and cronyism in the Bakiyev administration, as well as the country's poor economic situation and a recent rise in utility rates.

The sporadic and chaotic protests took many off guard both in Kyrgyzstan and abroad. The Guardian, a British national daily newspaper, published an article on 8 April that suggested the revolt could be dubbed the Fir Tree Revolution after the shrubs that looters dug up from the front garden of Kurmanbek Bakiyev. United Nations Secretary-General Ban Ki-moon arrived in Kyrgyzstan on 3 April, and protesters gathered outside the UN's headquarters in the capital of Bishkek to inform Ban Ki-moon of the media situation. A small group of protesters then moved to the center of town, but were stopped by police.

=== Foreign policy ===
Some people in the media suggested that the riots in the country and the opposition claim of having taken over the government were akin to the Tulip Revolution in 2005.

There is also an ongoing debate regarding the continuing US military presence in Kyrgyzstan.

Russia backed Bakiyev's government until March 2010. The Eurasian Daily Monitor reported on 1 April that, for two weeks, the Kremlin had used the Russian mass media to run a negative campaign against Bakiyev. Russia controls much of the media in Kyrgyzstan. The campaign sought to associate Bakiyev and his son, Maxim Bakiyev, with an allegedly corrupt businessman whose company had worked in a government project. It quoted that an arrest warrant had been issued in early March by Italian judge Aldo Morgigni for Eugene Gourevitch, a Kyrgyz-American who was accused of defrauding Telecom Italia. Gourevitch was at the time the managing director of a consulting agency that advised Kyrgyzstan's Development Fund, which in turn was managed by the Central Agency run by Maxim. The government soon began closing independent news outlets that reported on Gourevitch affair. Two newspapers were shut down on 18 March. Radio Azattyk, the Kyrgyz-language service of RFE/RL, went off the air shortly afterward. The opposition newspaper Forum was shut on 31 March, and the independent website Stan.tv had its equipment removed on 1 April.

The sudden campaign coincided with Bakiyev's failure to carry out Russia's various demands related to things such as military bases. On 1 April Russia also imposed duties on energy exports to Kyrgyzstan, claiming that a customs union between Russia, Belarus and Kazakhstan had forced it. It influenced fuel and transport prices immediately, and reportedly led to a massive protest in Talas on 6 April.

Michael McFaul, a senior United States White House adviser on Russian affairs stated in Prague that the seizure of power by the Kyrgyz opposition was not anti-American in nature, and was not a Russian backed coup. However, Omurbek Tekebayev, who is in charge of constitutional matters in the new government, said: "Russia played its role in ousting Bakiyev. You've seen the level of Russia's joy when they saw Bakiyev gone." Furthermore, Russian Prime Minister, Vladimir Putin, was the first foreign leader to recognise Roza Otunbayeva as the new Kyrgyz leader, and rang her soon after she announced she was in charge, while the deputy head of the interim Kyrgyz government, Almazbek Atambayev, flew to Moscow on 9 April for consultation with unspecified Russian government officials, ITAR-Tass news agency reported.

Vice-chairman of the State Duma of Russia Vladimir Zhirinovsky stated that the United States was involved in events in Kyrgyzstan to gain control of Manas Air Base.

Stratfor reported on 13 April "Given its strategic location, control of Kyrgyzstan offers the ability to pressure Kazakhstan, Uzbekistan, Tajikistan and China. Kyrgyzstan is thus a critical piece in Russia's overall plan to resurge into its former Soviet sphere".

== Uprising in Bishkek ==
On 6 April 2010, a demonstration in Talas by opposition leaders protested against government corruption and increased living expenses. The protests turned violent and spread nationwide. On 7 April 2010, Kyrgyz President Kurmanbek Bakiyev imposed a state of emergency. Police and special services arrested many opposition leaders. In response protesters took control over the internal security headquarters (former KGB headquarters) and a state TV channel in the capital, Bishkek. Reports by Kyrgyzstan government officials indicated that 88 people were killed and 458 hospitalized in bloody clashes with police in the capital. Bakiyev resigned on 15 April and left the country for Belarus.

=== 6 April ===
Locations of the main disturbances within Kyrgyzstan during April 2010

In the western city of Talas approximately 1,000 protesters stormed the government headquarters and briefly took government workers hostage. Security forces retook the building in the early evening, only to be quickly forced out again by protesters. Two prominent opposition leaders, Omurbek Tekebayev and Almazbek Atambayev, were arrested by Kyrgyz authorities. In Bishkek, a crowd of about 500 protesters began to gather around a bus stop in an industrial area, with several speakers making speeches about the events in Talas. Riot Police armed with batons, shields, and police dogs moved towards the crowd in a rectangular-shaped formation. The police rounded up the protesters and pushed them towards the buses. A large group of protesters then tore through police ranks and ran across the street, grabbed rocks, and attacked police, resulting in a massive fight, during which some policemen lost their helmets and batons.

=== 7 April ===
In the morning a small group of protesters were arrested outside the headquarters of the Social Democratic Party in Bishkek. Hundreds of protesters then gathered. Police attempted to stop them using tear gas and stun grenades, but the protesters overwhelmed the police, and took control of two armored vehicles and numerous automatic weapons. The protest group, now numbering between three and five thousand, then moved towards the center of town and into Ala-Too Square, where gunshots and stun grenades could be heard, and protesters were seen fleeing. Protesters in Bishkek filled Ala-Too Square and surrounded the White House, the office of Kyrgyzstan's president. Police began using tear gas, rubber bullets, and stun grenades to disperse protesters. In an attempt to gain entrance to the presidential office, demonstrators drove two trucks into the gates of the White House, at which point it was reported that police started firing on protesters with live ammunition. Witnesses reported that both protesters and riot police were wounded during the clashes, and at least forty-one protesters were killed. A state of emergency was declared, as well as a curfew from 10 pm to 6 am.

Later that day opposition leaders and demonstrators stormed the parliament building, led by the opposition leader Omurbek Tekebayev, who had been arrested the day before but was subsequently released. The headquarters for KTR, Kyrgyzstan's main television broadcaster, was also taken over by protesters. After being off the air for part of the day, KTR resumed transmission Wednesday evening featuring members of the opposition as well as human rights representatives. By late Wednesday opposition leaders had announced the formation of a new government, and soon thereafter reports came in that President Bakiyev had left Bishkek and flown to Osh in southern Kyrgyzstan. There were no reported demonstrations in Osh.

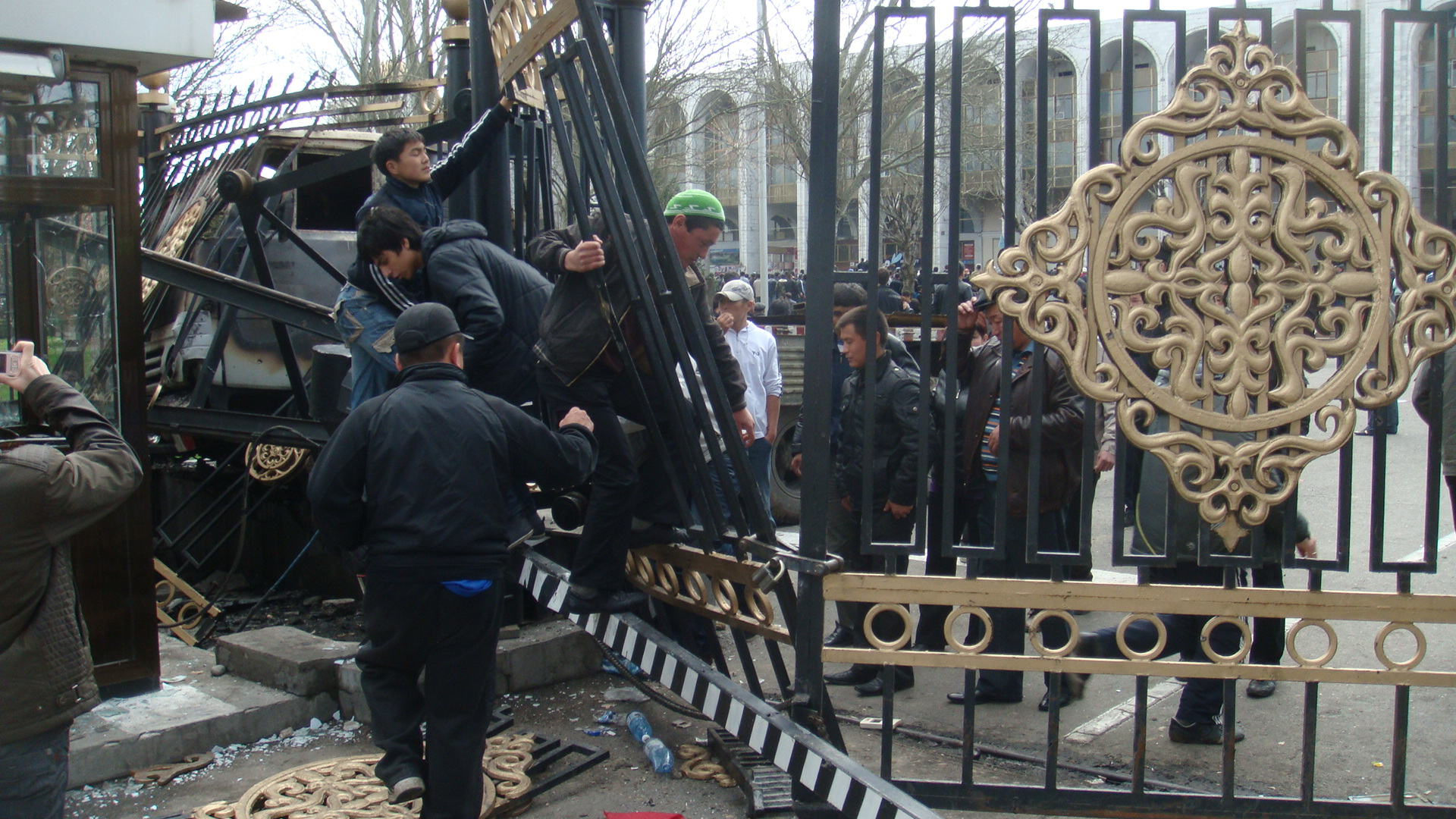
Kyrgyz entering the otherwise-closed White House lawn following protests in Bishkek on 7 April.

In addition to Bishkek and Talas, rallies and protests were reported in other parts of the country, including Naryn, Tokmok, and the Issyk-Kul region. There were also reports that the government of the Issyk-Kul region had been taken over by members of opposition parties. There was an information blackout throughout much of the country, as TV stations went off the air and both phones and internet became unreliable.

There were conflicting reports about the fate of Kyrgyz Interior Minister Moldomusa Kongantiyev. Some reports said he was being held hostage by protesters in Talas, while other reports said he had been killed. The Kyrgyz Interior Ministry denied reports of his death, calling them "fictitious". There were also reports saying he had been badly battered, but had survived. Kongantiyev was later shown badly beaten, but alive. Opposition leaders announced that they had formed a new provisional government headed by Roza Otunbayeva.

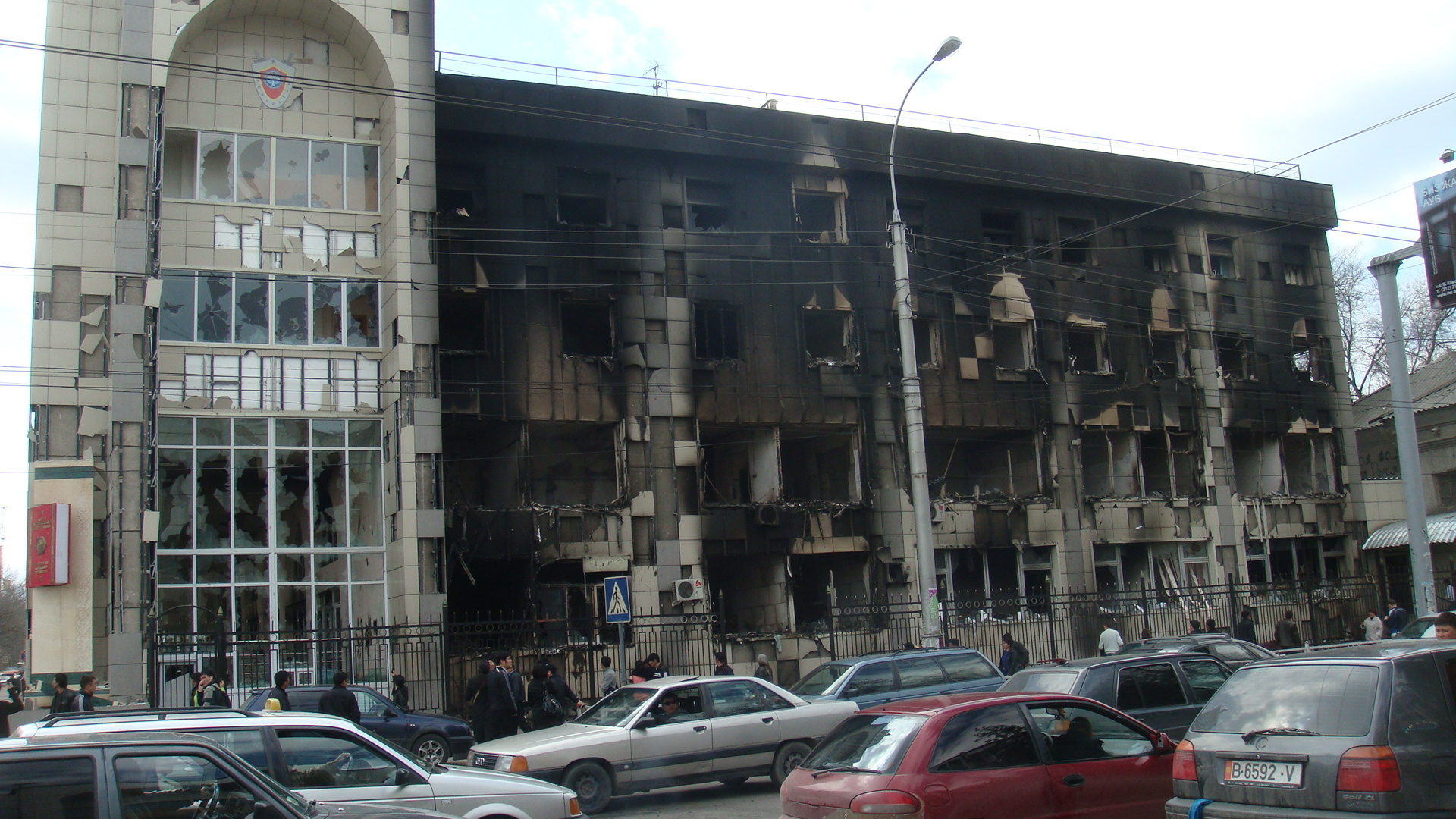
The charred shell of the prosecutor's office in Bishkek, which caught fire during the demonstrations.

=== 8 April ===
President Bakiyev, who was confirmed by the Kyrgyzstan Ministry of Defense to be in his residence in Osh, has acknowledged that he currently had no power to influence events in the country, though he refused to resign his post.

Even with the opposition reporting itself in control of the police and the army, residents in Bishkek began forming volunteer militias to stave off marauders.

The interim government announced it would hold on to power for six months, when presidential elections would be held.

=== 9–14 April ===
A few days later Bakiyev commented from his hometown of Osh that he would not resign and called for the UN to send troops to the country to restore order. A rally in his hometown was followed by another bigger rally giving him support in his quest to return to the seat of government. In response the interim Interior Minister said an arrest warrant would be issued for him while his immunity was removed. On 13 April, Bakiyev said he would resign should his security and that of his family and entourage be guaranteed. He said "In what case would I resign? First of all, they should guarantee that in Kyrgyzstan there are no more people walking around with weapons, and no seizures or redistribution of property. Also, I need to know that my own security and the security of members of my family and those close to me will be assured." The interim government said it could only guarantee his security should he resign and leave the country. Tension mounted in the country when the interim government threatened to hunt down Bakiyev while simultaneously offering an olive branch should he go into exile. In response Bakiyev said "Let them try to seize me. Let them try to kill me. I believe this will lead to such a great deal of bloodshed which no one will be able to justify." During a nuclear summit in Washington the Russian President Dmitry Medvedev suggested Kyrgyzstan was in the throes of a civil war and that it could turn into a "second Afghanistan" if the political deadlock was not resolved. He said that "The risk of Kyrgyzstan breaking apart – into the south and the north – really exist[ed]." On 14 April 2010, interim leader Roza Otunbayeva announced that President Bakiyev, his defense minister, as well as relatives in government and political allies would face trial over the deaths of protesters. A Kyrgyz court issued an arrest warrant for Bakiyev's brother Janybek Bakiyev, eldest son Marat Bakiyev and former Prime Minister Daniar Usenov.

=== Bakiyev resignation ===
On 15 April at a rally by Bakiyev in front of a 1,000 supporters gunshots were heard, although Bakiyev was reported to have safely left the scene. Some claimed that the firing came from his own bodyguards in order to keep the peace and avoid a confrontation with opponents. Later in the day Bakiyev was reported to have flown into exile to the Kazakhstani city of Taraz. it was said that he would continue negotiations on a settlement to the crisis from exile. The interim government responded to this by calling his departure a "deportation", saying he had allegedly submitted a request to resign amid reports indicating that Baktybek Kaliyev, a former defence minister, had been arrested. The interim government also said it would seek Bakiyev's transfer to a Kyrgyz or international court for trial at a later date. Kazakhstan, as the chair of the Organisation for Security and Co-operation in Europe, confirmed Bakiyev's departure saying it was an important step towards preventing civil war. It added that joint efforts between themselves and Dmitry Medvedev and Barack Obama had fostered such an agreement. Bakiyev submitted a hand-written resignation letter saying "I tender my resignation in these tragic days as I understand the full scale of my responsibility for the future of the Kyrgyz people". The interim president allegedly said "he had become a source of instability ... [that] they could no longer tolerate that". She added that most of his entourage was still in the country and that she would press ahead with bringing Bakyiev to trial. On 20 April, the Belarusian president, Alexander Lukashenko said his country had afforded Bakiyev and three members of his family "the protection of our state, and personally of the president." On 21 April, in a statement from Minsk, Bakiyev said he still considers himself the country's president and pledged to do all he can to return the country to its "constitutional field". He then upped the ante by saying, "I do not recognise my resignation. Nine months ago the people of Kyrgyzstan elected me their president and there is no power that can stop me. Only death can stop me". He then called on the international community not to support the interim government. "Everyone must know the bandits who are trying to take power are the executors of an external force and have no legitimacy." He called on leaders of the international community: do not "set a precedent" and do not recognise "this gang as the legitimate authorities." Russia consequently rejected this assertion on the grounds that he had already tendered his resignation saying "this document cannot be rejected by a verbal statement." He also accused the Russians of being annoyed with his allowing the Manas air base to continue operating for the Americans and NATO to supply their forces in the Afghan war. On 23 April, Bakiyev backtracked on his vow to return to power, but claimed his resignation is invalid because the new government is failing to protect his family as was promised.

== Subsequent events ==
By 18 April, Bakiyev supporters seized a regional government office in the south of the country, after appointing their own governor, Paizullabek Rahmanov. Some 1,000 people gathered in the southwestern town's main square on 19 April, denouncing the interim government and chanting pro-Bakiyev slogans. Some of them gave out flyers calling for the former president's return to the country. Different rallies also took place on that day in neighboring Osh and Batken provinces. In addition, the interim government's appointment of a new mayor of Kyzyl-Kiya in Batken Province sparked protests in the town. The protesters prevented an official from entering her office on 19 April.

In Bishkek, upwards of a thousand stone-throwing men rioted in Bishkek suburbs to try to seize land from ethnic Russians and Meskhetian Turks on 19 April. As a result, at least five people were killed and thirty more injured. On 19 April, a crowd of youths tried to seize land in Mayevka and clashed with the local residents. In the ensuing riot, several houses were looted and set on fire, while gunfire was exchanged between the villagers. Many residents were forced to flee the village. Otunbayeva said the government would be "resolute in cracking down on looting, mayhem and arson and mete out severe punishment for those breaching the law." She had reportedly given orders for security officers to use "deadly force" on rioters that threatened her fledgling government's grip on power. The United States Transit Center Manas was attacked by revolutionaries armed with firearms and grenades. The base itself was engaged in a stand off with 2 heavily armored personnel carriers. Intelligence received was that the local revolutionaries were going to attempt to reclaim the base and airfield should any member for the former government attempt to escape.

On 22 April 2010, it was announced that a constitutional referendum, in order to reduce presidential powers and "strengthen democracy", would be held on 27 June 2010; a general elections would then follow on 10 October 2010.

On 13 May 2010, numerous government buildings were stormed by supporters of the ex-president in Jalal-Abad, Batken and Osh, forcing the interim governor of Jalal-Abad to flee. On 14 May conflicting reports emerged of deaths of pro-Bakiev supporters after a conflict with interim government forces in Jalal-Abad, with pro-Bakiev groups reporting 8 dead, whilst the Kyrgyz Health Ministry reporting 65 injured, 15 of them critically with one of the critically injured dying the next day.

On 19 May 2010, pro-Bakiev supporters clashed with supporters of local Uzbek leader Kadyzhan Batyrov in the southern city of Jalal-Abad, accusing him of allowing his followers to use guns on pro-Bakiev protestors on 13 May. Fighting intensified near the University of Peoples' Friendship resulting in the deaths of at least two people and 16 further injuries. Later that day Roza Otunbayeva became the temporary president of Kyrgyzstan. On 31 May, Uzbekistan moved troops to its border with Kyrgyzstan due to increasing border tensions as clashes between two villages on opposite sides of the border occurred and villagers rampaged destroying roads and water pipes. Uzbek assault troops and armoured vehicles arrived on the border to prevent further clashes.

=== June riots ===
On 9 June violence erupted in the southern city of Osh with ethnic Kyrgyz rioting, attacking minority Uzbeks and lighting their property ablaze. By the 12th the violence had spread to the city of Jalal-Abad. The spreading of the violence required the interim government led by Roza Otunbayeva to declare a state of emergency on 12 June, in an attempt to take control of the situation. Uzbekistan launched a limited troop incursion early on, but withdrew and opened its borders to Uzbek refugees. The clashes killed up to 2,000 people, mostly Uzbeks, and another 100,000 were displaced.

== October election and aftermath ==
Following the Kyrgyzstani parliamentary election, 2010, the pro-Bakiyev Ata-Zhurt party won a plurality as it campaigned to roll back the new constitution and bring Bakiyev back from exile.

A provisional government was established with the following leaders at its head:

- Head of Provisional Government Roza Otunbayeva
  - Deputy of Finance Temir Sariev
  - Deputy of Economy Almazbek Atambayev
  - Deputy of Constitutional Reform Omurbek Tekebayev
  - Deputy of Prosecution Bodies and Financial Police Azimbek Beknazarov (acting Prosecutor-General in 2005)
- Minister of Internal Affairs Bolotbek Sherniyazov
- Minister of Health Care Damira Niyaz-Aliyeva
- Head of National Security Service (GNSB) Keneshbek Duyshebayev

== International reaction ==
Various states in the region and beyond expressed concern and called for stability in the country. International bodies like the UN, EU and the OSCE also made similar calls.

The International Committee of the Red Cross expressed its deep concern about the worsening humanitarian situation in southern Kyrgyzstan and called on the Kyrgyz authorities to do everything in their power to protect their citizens, restore order and ensure respect for the rule of law.,

=== States ===
United Nations
A spokesman for Secretary-General Ban Ki-moon said Bakiyev's departure was "an important step toward the peaceful, stable, prosperous and democratic development of the country and its good governance."

Belarus
President Alexander Lukashenko said he would give Bakiyev asylum under the protection of the state after Bakiyev had made an emotional appeal to the President to take at least his family if not himself.

Japan
On a message from the Ministry of Foreign Affairs of Japan the Press Secretary/Director-General for Press and Public Relations stated: "The Government of Japan expects that this agreement will facilitate the advancement of the normalization of the situation in the Kyrgyz Republic and expresses its respect for the efforts by concerned countries including the United States of America, Russia, and Kazakhstan, as well as concerned international organizations such as OSCE."

Kazakhstan
After Bakiyev flew out of the country into exile in Kazakhstan he was to meet president Nursultan Nazarbayev for talks. This was after Kazakhstan confirmed Bakiyev's departure saying it was an important step towards preventing civil war. The step was a result of joint efforts between the two parties and Dmitry Medvedev and Barack Obama for Bakiyev to leave the country.

Russia
President Medvedev said the Bakiyev regime collapsed because of corruption, reliance on clan ties and inability to solve social problems. PM Putin also promised a member of the provisional government, Almazbek Atambayev, that Russia would give $50 million in aid and loans and 25,000 tons of fuel to aid the spring planting season.

Turkey
Prime Minister Recep Tayyip Erdoğan urged Kyrgyzstan to stop the violence and rebuild the stability of the nation. Turkey, which is a main ally of Kyrgyzstan due to Turkic Culture, fully supported Kyrgyzstan provisional Government.

== See also ==
- Day of the People's April Revolution
