= Rebrov =

Rebrov (Russian: Ребров, from ребро meaning rib) is a Russian masculine surname, its feminine counterpart is Rebrova. It may refer to

- Artyom Rebrov (born 1984), Russian football player
- Ivan Rebroff (1931–2008), German singer
- Ivan Rebrov (1890–1938), Soviet chairman
- Serhii Rebrov (born 1974), Ukrainian football manager and former player
  - Serhiy Rebrov club
