= Tynychbek Akmatbayev =

Kyrgyz politician (1962–2005)

Tynychbek Abdymalikovich Akmatbayev (Russian: Тынычбек Абдымаликович Акматбаев; January 30, 1962 – October 20, 2005) was a member of parliament in Kyrgyzstan and head of the parliamentary law enforcement committee. Akmatbayev was killed by inmates (Aziz Batukayev) at the Moldavanovka prison on October 20, 2005, while investigating unrest at the prison northwest of Bishkek. Akmatbayev's killing prompted prison guards to pull out of Moldavanovka and other prisons, leaving inmates in control.

The death of Akmatbayev was the third killing of a Kyrgyz MP since the Tulip Revolution in March 2005. Akmatbayev's brother, Ryspek, led public accusations that the prime minister, Felix Kulov, might have been linked to the killing. Kulov denied the allegation.

Less than a year after his death, his brother Rysbek Akmatbayev was killed on 10 May 2006 in a drive-by shooting.
