= People's Congress of Kyrgyzstan =

The People's Congress of Kyrgyzstan (Kyrgyz: Кыргызстан элдик конгресси) was an electoral alliance formed between the Ar-Namys (Dignity) party and three other opposition parties in Kyrgyzstan. Former Prime Minister Felix Kulov was elected Chairman of the Congress in November 2001. The Congress was founded to create an authentic democratic state and lead Kyrgyzstan out of political and economic crisis.

The Congress consisted of

- Ar-Namys
- Ata-Meken
- People's Party
- Erkindik

In 2002 Erkindik left the Congress and joined the People's Movement of Kyrgyzstan. While in 2004 the Ar-Namys party agreed to cooperate with the For Fair Elections electoral alliance in preparation for the February 2005 parliamentary elections.
