= Rysbek Akmatbayev =

Kyrgyz businessman, politician, and criminal leader

- Born: Rysbek Akmatbayev; 6 July 1960
- Died: 10 May 2006 (aged 45)
- Occupations: Businessperson; Politician

Rysbek Abdymalikovich Akmatbayev (Russian: Рысбек Абдымаликович Акматбаев; 6 July 1960 – 10 May 2006) was a Kyrgyz businessman, politician and alleged criminal leader.

Under President Askar Akayev, Akmatbayev and a number of other alleged criminal figures including Bayaman Erkinbayev were facing a variety of criminal charges including murder. Seeing an opportunity during the 2005 Tulip Revolution, the mafia participated heavily in the coup and subsequently won positions in the post-revolutionary government. Ryspek was elected to parliament in April 2006. However, a power struggle emerged, and several politicians including Erkinbayev, Raatbek Sanatbayev and Ryspek's own brother Tynychbek were assassinated, the latter having died during a prison riot orchestrated by another Kyrgyz criminal, thief in law Aziz Batukayev.

Ryspek subsequently associated Batukayev with prime minister Felix Kulov, and held nationwide protests demanding his resignation. He was himself shot dead leaving a mosque in May 2006.
