= Almanbet Matubraimov =

Kyrgyz politician (born 1952)

Almanbe Matubraimov
- Алманбет Матубраимов

Acting Prime Minister of Kyrgyzstan
- In office 13 December 1993 – 14 December 1993
- President: Askar Akayev
- Preceded by: Tursunbek Chyngyshev
- Succeeded by: Apas Jumagulov

Personal details
- Born: 25 August 1952 (age 72); Uzgen District, Osh Region, Kirghiz SSR, Soviet Union

Almanbet Matubraimovich Matubraimov (Note: Kyrgyz: Алманбет Матубраим уулу Матубраимов, romanized: Almanbet Matubraím uulu Matubraímov, IPA: [ɑɫmanpét mɑtʰʊpɾaɪ́m‿uːɫʊ́ mɑtʰʊpɾaɪ́məɸ]) (born 25 August 1952) is a politician from Kyrgyzstan. In December 1993, he served briefly the acting Prime Minister of Kyrgyzstan. He took over from Tursunbek Chyngyshev. He served as the Chairman of the Assembly of People's Representatives from March 1995 to November 1997.

On 3 January 2006, Matubraimov was appointed to the role of representing Kyrgyzstan in the Eurasian Economic Community (EurAsEC).

== Notes ==
Political offices
Preceded by Tursunbek Chyngyshev	Acting Prime Minister of Kyrgyzstan; 1993	Succeeded by Apas Jumagulov
