= Chairman of the Cabinet of Ministers of Kyrgyzstan =

Head of government

Chairman of the Cabinet of Ministers of the Kyrgyz Republic
- Кыргыз Республикасынын Министрлер Кабинетинин төрагасы (Kyrgyz); Председатель Кабинета министров Кыргызской Республики (Russian)
- Emblem of Kyrgyzstan

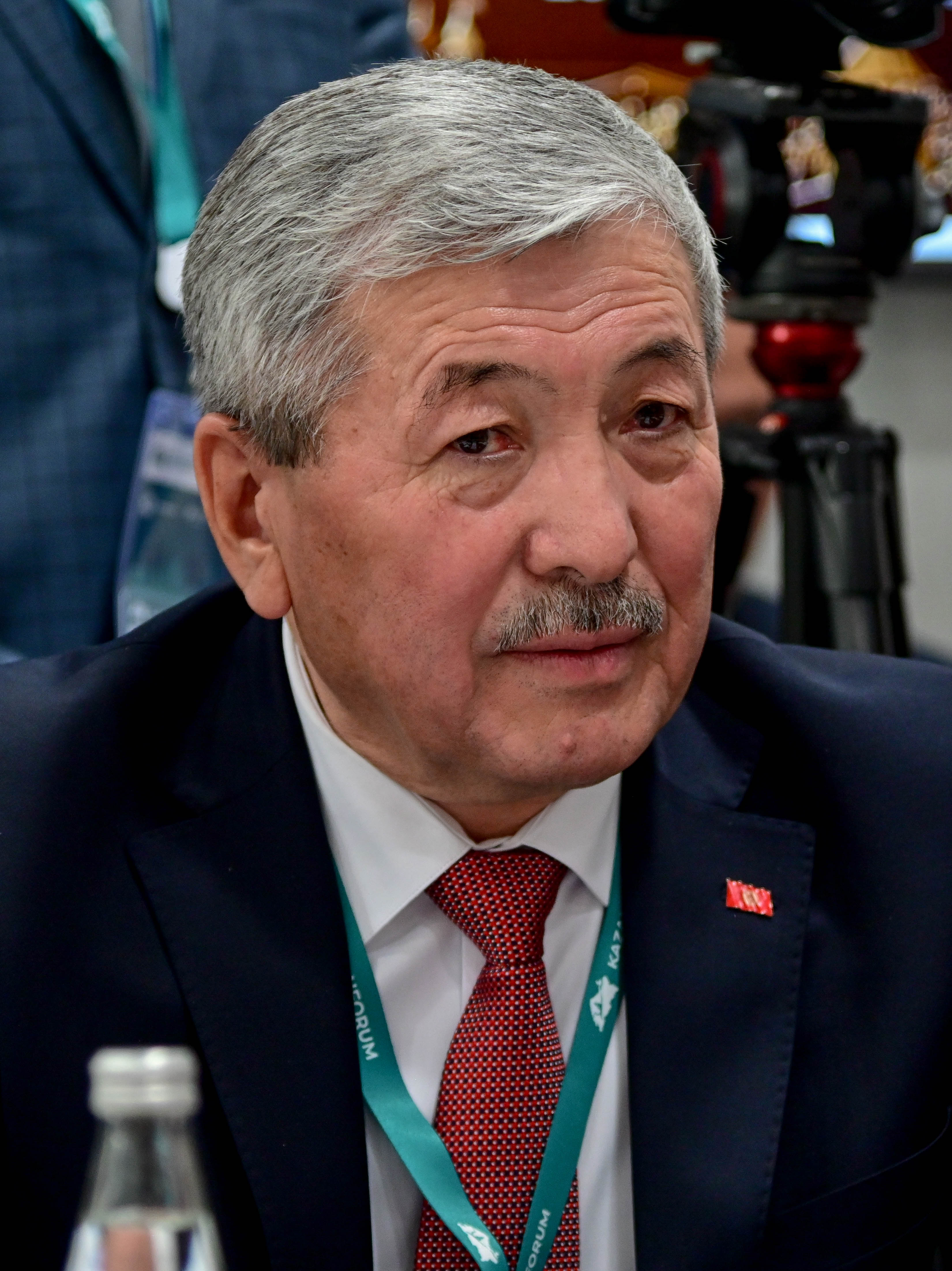
- Incumbent; Adylbek Kasymaliev since 16 December 2024
- Style: Mr. Chairman (informally); His Excellency (international correspondence)
- Member of: Cabinet; Security Council
- Residence: Ala Archa State Residence, Bishkek
- Appointer: President of Kyrgyzstan
- Inaugural holder: Nasirdin Isanov (modern post: Ulukbek Maripov)
- Formation: 21 January 1991 (prime minister); 5 May 2021 (modern post)
- Salary: 870 000 som annually
- Website: gov.kg

The Prime Minister's Office on Old Square, Bishkek.

The chairman of the Cabinet of Ministers of Kyrgyzstan, (Note: Russian: Председатель Кабинета министров Кыргызской Республики; Kyrgyz: Кыргыз Республикасынын Министрлер Кабинетинин төрагасы, romanized: Kyrgyz Respublikasynyn Ministrler Kabinetinin töragasy) formerly known as the prime minister of Kyrgyzstan, (Note: Kyrgyz: Кыргыз Республикасынын премьер-министри, romanized: Kyrgyz Respublikasynyn premier-ministri) is the presiding officer of the Cabinet of Ministers of the Kyrgyz Republic.

== Powers ==
Until 2010, the president was in a stronger position than the prime minister in Kyrgyzstan, but after the 2010 constitutional referendum, the state transitioned to a parliamentary system, placing greater power in parliament and the cabinet at the expense of the president. This was reverted in 2021 after the Kyrgyz constitutional referendum, with the president once again reinstated as the chief executive and the renamed prime minister demoted to being senior-most of the president's advisors.

== History of the office ==
Kubatbek Boronov was the acting prime minister from 16 June 2020, succeeding Mukhammedkalyi Abylgaziev after his resignation due to his cabinet's heavy corruption case.

Following election protests, Boronov resigned and was replaced on 6 October 2020 by opposition party founder Sadyr Japarov and again by Artem Novikov on 14 November 2020 to 3 February 2021.

== List of officeholders ==
No.	Portrait	Name (Birth–Death)	Term of office		Party
Prime Minister of Kyrgyzstan (1991–2021)
1		Nasirdin Isanov (1943–1991)	21 January 1991	29 November 1991	Independent
2		Andrei Iordan (1934–2006)	29 November 1991	10 February 1992	Independent
3		Tursunbek Chyngyshev (born 1942)	10 February 1992	13 December 1993	Independent
4		Almanbet Matubraimov (born 1952)	13 December 1993	14 December 1993	Independent
5		Apas Jumagulov (born 1934)	14 December 1993	14 March 1998	Independent
6		Kubanychbek Jumaliyev (born 1956)	14 March 1998	23 December 1998	Independent
7		Boris Silayev (born 1946)	23 December 1998	25 December 1998	Independent
8		Jumabek Ibraimov (1944–1999)	25 December 1998	4 April 1999	Independent
9		Boris Silayev (born 1946)	4 April 1999	12 April 1999	Independent
10		Amangeldy Muraliyev (born 1947)	12 April 1999	21 December 2000	Independent
11		Kurmanbek Bakiyev (born 1949)	21 December 2000	22 May 2002	Independent
12		Nikolai Tanayev (1945–2020)	22 May 2002	25 March 2005	Independent
—		Kurmanbek Bakiyev (born 1949)	25 March 2005	28 March 2005	People's Movement of Kyrgyzstan
(11)		Kurmanbek Bakiyev (born 1949)	28 March 2005	20 June 2005	People's Movement of Kyrgyzstan
13		Medetbek Kerimkulov (born 1949)	20 June 2005	10 July 2005	Independent
(11)		Kurmanbek Bakiyev (born 1949)	10 July 2005	15 August 2005	People's Movement of Kyrgyzstan
—		Felix Kulov (born 1948)	15 August 2005	1 September 2005	Ar-Namys
14		Felix Kulov (born 1948)	1 September 2005	29 January 2007	Ar-Namys
15		Azim Isabekov (born 1960)	29 January 2007	29 March 2007	Ar-Namys
16		Almazbek Atambayev (born 1956)	29 March 2007	28 November 2007	Social Democratic Party of Kyrgyzstan
17		Iskenderbek Aidaraliyev (born 1955)	28 November 2007	24 December 2007	Independent
18		Igor Chudinov (born 1961)	24 December 2007	21 October 2009	Ak Jol
19		Daniar Usenov (born 1960)	21 October 2009	7 April 2010	Ak Jol
(16)		Almazbek Atambayev (born 1956)	17 December 2010	23 September 2011	Social Democratic Party of Kyrgyzstan
20		Ömürbek Babanov (born 1970)	23 September 2011	14 November 2011	Respublika Party of Kyrgyzstan
(16)		Almazbek Atambayev (born 1956)	14 November 2011	1 December 2011	Social Democratic Party of Kyrgyzstan
—		Ömürbek Babanov (born 1970)	1 December 2011	24 December 2011	Respublika Party of Kyrgyzstan
20		Ömürbek Babanov (born 1970)	24 December 2011	1 September 2012	Respublika Party of Kyrgyzstan
21		Aaly Karashev (born 1968)	1 September 2012	6 September 2012	Respublika Party of Kyrgyzstan
22		Zhantoro Satybaldiyev (born 1956)	6 September 2012	25 March 2014	Independent
—		Djoomart Otorbaev (born 1955)	25 March 2014	3 April 2014	Ata Meken
23		Djoomart Otorbaev (born 1955)	3 April 2014	1 May 2015	Ata Meken
24		Temir Sariyev (born 1963)	1 May 2015	13 April 2016	Akshumkar
25		Sooronbay Jeenbekov (born 1958)	13 April 2016	22 August 2017	Social Democratic Party of Kyrgyzstan
26		Mukhammetkalyi Abylgaziev (born 1968)	22 August 2017	26 August 2017	Independent
27		Sapar Isakov (born 1977)	26 August 2017	19 April 2018	Social Democratic Party of Kyrgyzstan
(26)		Mukhammedkalyi Abylgaziev (born 1968)	20 April 2018	15 June 2020	Independent
28		Kubatbek Boronov (born 1964)	17 June 2020	6 October 2020	Independent
29		Almazbek Batyrbekov (born 1970); Acting Prime Minister (Disputed)	9 October 2020	14 October 2020	Kyrgyzstan
—		Sadyr Japarov (born 1968)	6 October 2020	10 October 2020	Mekenchil
30		Sadyr Japarov (born 1968)	10 October 2020	14 November 2020	Mekenchil
31		Artem Novikov (born 1987)	14 November 2020	3 February 2021	Independent
32		Ulukbek Maripov (born 1979)	3 February 2021	5 May 2021	Independent
Chairman of the Cabinet of Ministers (since 2021)
32		Ulukbek Maripov (born 1979)	5 May 2021	12 October 2021	Independent
33		Akylbek Japarov (born 1965)	12 October 2021	16 December 2024	Ar-Namys
34		Adylbek Kasymaliev (born 1960)	16 December 2024	Incumbent	Independent

== Timeline ==
This timeline lists the heads of government of the Kirghiz Autonomous Socialist Soviet Republic, the Kirghiz Soviet Socialist Republic, and the modern Republic of Kyrgyzstan.

== See also ==
- List of leaders of Kyrgyzstan
- President of Kyrgyzstan
- Vice President of Kyrgyzstan
