= German Kuznetsov =

2nd Vice President of Kyrgyzstan

- Герман Кузнецов

2nd Vice President of Kyrgyzstan
- In office January 1991 – 27 February 1992
- President: Askar Akayev
- Preceded by: Nasirdin Isanov
- Succeeded by: Feliks Kulov

Personal details
- Born: 25 March 1948 (age 78) Ivanovo, RSFSR, Soviet Union

German Serapionovich Kuznetsov (Russian: Герман Серапионович Кузнецов; born 25 March 1948) is a Kyrgyz-Russian politician. He was Vice President of Kyrgyzstan from 1991 to 1992 under Askar Akayev.

Kuznetsov was born in 1948 in Ivanovo and is an ethnic Russian. He joined the Communist Party in 1973. In line with the Soviet human resource policies, he changed many positions in various locations ending with the office of second secretary of the regional party committee in Frunze, capital of Kirghiz SSR.

As the Communists were actively losing their support in the early 1990s, Kuznetsov joined the team of the new Kyrgyzstani leader Askar Akayev, becoming his vice president in January 1991. Akayev replaced him on 27 February 1992 in favor of Feliks Kulov. Additionally he was the chairman of the KGB of the Kyrgyz SSR from August to September 1991, and also First Deputy Prime Minister of the Republic of Kyrgyzstan since March 1992.

He later resigned as deputy Prime Minister, and emigrated to Moscow in July 1993. From 1996 to 1999 he was the chief of Gokhran, Russia's precious metals fund.

== Personal life ==
He is married with two children.

== Awards ==
- Order “For Merit to the Fatherland”
- Certificate of Honor of the Government of the Russian Federation
- Honorary Citizen of the City of Orsk” (August 21, 2019)
