= Vice President of Kyrgyzstan =

- Emblem of Kyrgyzstan (1956–1994)

- Flag of Kyrgyzstan (1992–2023)

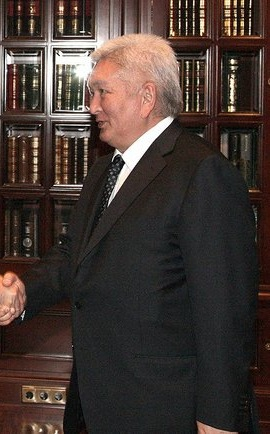
- Felix Kulov
- Appointer: President
- Precursor: None
- Formation: December 1990
- First holder: Nasirdin Isanov
- Final holder: Feliks Kulov
- Abolished: December 1993
- Superseded by: Prime Minister of Kyrgyzstan

The vice president of Kyrgyzstan was a political position in the government of Kyrgyzstan created in December 1990. The position was abolished in 1993.

The Vice President was charged with assuming the duties of the president should the president be unable to perform them. Under article 50 of the 2007 constitution, the Prime Minister now bears that responsibility.

== Office holders ==
Name	Took office	Left office	Notes
Nasirdin Isanov	December 1990	January 1991	
German Kuznetsov	January 1991	February 1992	
Feliks Kulov	February 1992	December 1993	

== See also ==
- List of leaders of Kyrgyzstan
- President of Kyrgyzstan
- Prime Minister of Kyrgyzstan
