= Andrei Iordan =

Kyrgyz statesman (1934–2006)

- Андрей Иордан

Prime Minister of Kyrgyzstan Acting
- In office 29 November 1991 – 10 February 1992
- President: Askar Akayev
- Preceded by: Nasirdin Isanov
- Succeeded by: Tursunbek Chyngyshev

Personal details
- Born: December 22, 1934 Georgiyevka, Saratov Oblast, Volga German Autonomous Soviet Socialist Republic, Soviet Union
- Died: January 20, 2006 (aged 71) Bishkek, Kyrgyzstan
- Spouse: Svetlana Vladimirovna Iordan
- Children: Oksana

Andrei Andreyevich Iordan (Russian: Андрей Андреевич Иордан; 22 December 1934 – 20 January 2006) was a Kyrgyz statesman who served as the State Secretary of Kyrgyzstan and temporarily exercised the duties of Prime Minister from 29 November 1991 to 10 February 1992. He served as Minister of Industry and Foreign Trade and later as an adviser to the Prime Minister.

Political offices
Preceded by Nasirdin Isanov	Acting Prime Minister of Kyrgyzstan; 1991–1992	Succeeded by Tursunbek Chyngyshev
