= Tursunbek Chyngyshev =

Kyrgyz politician (born 1942)

- Турсунбек Чынгышев
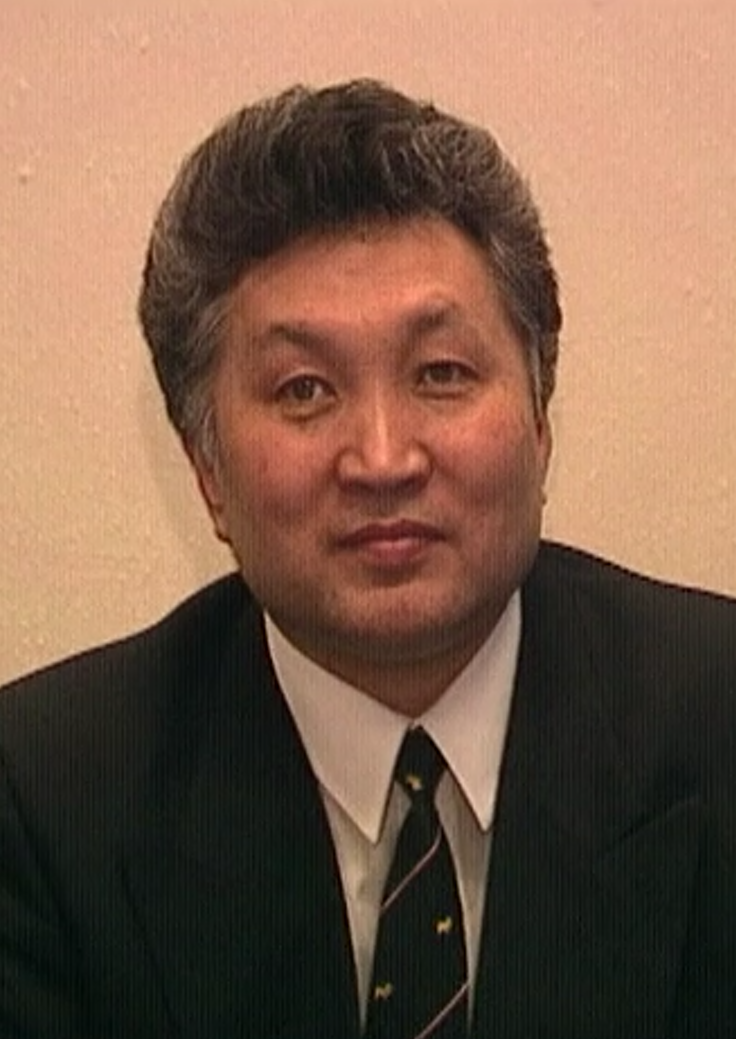
- Chyngyshev in 1993

2nd Prime Minister of Kyrgyzstan
- In office 10 February 1992 – 13 December 1993
- President: Askar Akayev
- Preceded by: Andrei Iordan
- Succeeded by: Almanbet Matubraimov

Personal details
- Born: 15 October 1942 (age 83) Naryn Region, Kyrgyz SSR, USSR

Tursunbek Chyngyshev (Note: Kyrgyz: Турсунбек Чынгыш уулу Чынгышев, romanized: Tursunbek Chyngysh uulu Chyngyshev, pronounced [tʰʊɾsʊnpék t͡ɕʰɯɴʁɯ́ɕɘɸ]) (born 15 October 1942) served as the Prime Minister of Kyrgyzstan from 10 February 1992 to 13 December 1993. He left office due to a motion of no confidence in the Kyrgyz parliament allegedly caused by the Seabeco gold scandal.

== Notes ==
Political offices
Preceded by Andrei Iordan (acting)	Prime Minister of Kyrgyzstan; 1992–1993	Succeeded by Almanbet Matubraimov (acting)
