= Azim Isabekov =

Prime Minister of Kyrgyzstan (born 1960)

- Азим Исабеков

10th Prime Minister of the Kyrgyz Republic
- In office 29 January 2007 – 29 March 2007
- President: Kurmanbek Bakiyev
- Preceded by: Felix Kulov
- Succeeded by: Almazbek Atambayev

Personal details
- Born: 4 April 1960 (age 66) Arashan, Chuy Province, Kyrgyzstan
- Party: Ar-Namys (?)

Azim Beishembayevich Isabekov (Kyrgyz: Азимбек Бейшембаевич Исабеков; born 4 April 1960) is a Kyrgyz politician who served as the 10th Prime Minister of Kyrgyzstan from 29 January until 29 March 2007.

Isabekov was born in Arashan, Chui Oblast and was trained as an economist, graduating from Kyrgyz State National University in 1986. After college he was a Komsomol (communist youth organization) organizer. In 1997 he went to work for Governor Kurmanbek Bakiyev as his chief of staff in the Governor's Office of Chui. When Bakiyev became the prime minister in 2000, Isabekov followed him as the head of the administrative department in prime minister's office. Bakiyev and Isabekov lost their jobs when the government fell in 2002 in response to the killing of a number of unarmed demonstrators at Aksy.

Isabekov served as deputy head of Kyrgyz President Kurmanbek Bakiyev's administration from 2005 to May 2006 when he was appointed as Minister of Agriculture, Water Resources and Processing Industry, upon the dismissal of the former minister Abdimalik Anarbaev.

Azim Isabekov replaced Acting Prime Minister Felix Kulov after the Supreme Council twice rejected the nomination for Kulov and voted 57-4 for him instead.

On 28 March, Isabekov dismissed a number of ministers, saying that he wanted to incorporate new people in the government to enhance the country's stability, but Bakiyev rejected this move. Isabekov resigned the next day; Bakiyev accepted his resignation and appointed Almazbek Atambaev as acting prime minister.

Preceded by Felix Kulov	Prime Minister of Kyrgyzstan; 2007	Succeeded by Almazbek Atambayev
