= Murat Salihov =

Kyrgyzstani politician

- Мурат Салыков
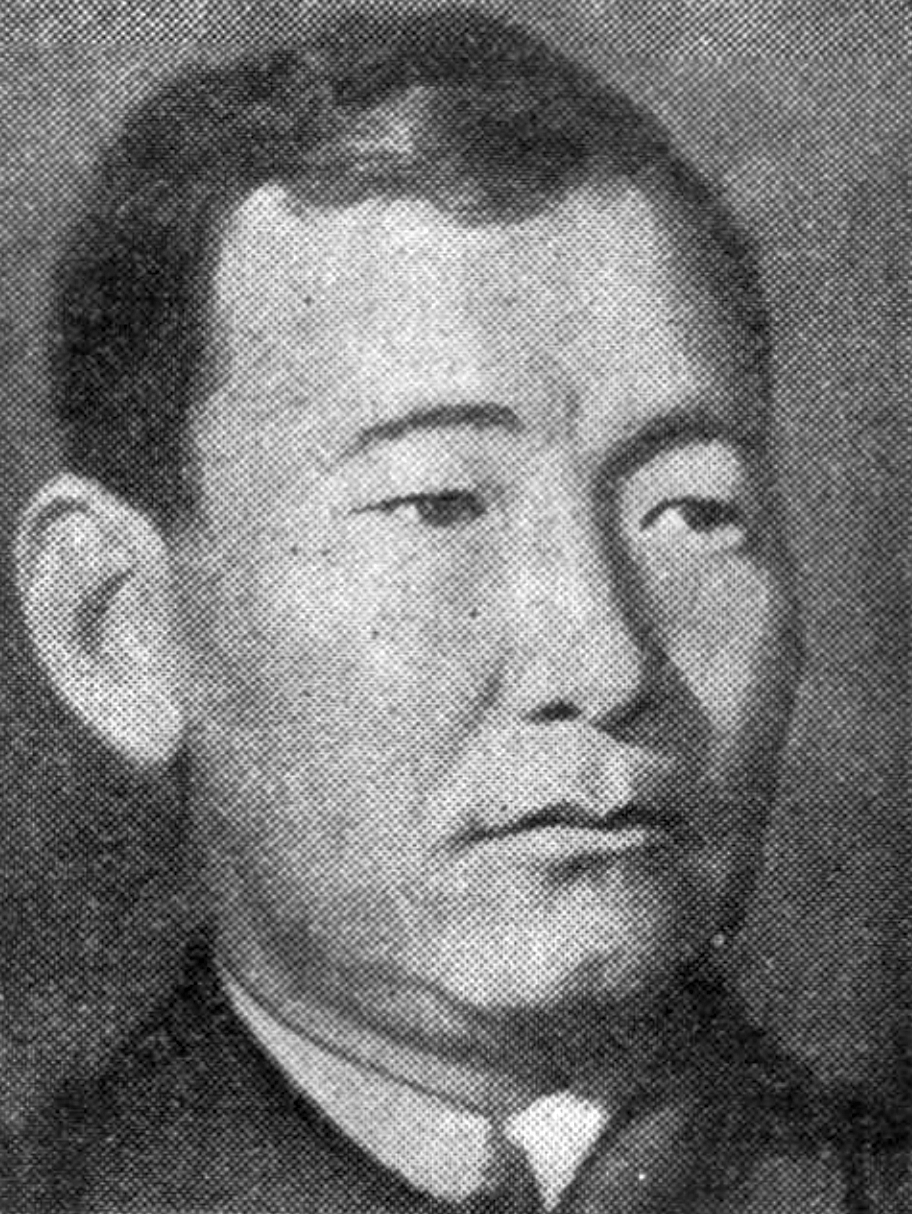

2nd Chairman of the Council of People's Commissars of the Kyrgyz SSR
- In office 27 September 1937 – 15 February 1938
- Preceded by: Bayaly Isakeev
- Succeeded by: Ismail Abuzyarov (act.)

Personal details
- Born: 1905 Ravat, Osh district, Fergana Oblast, Russian Empire
- Died: 5 November 1938 (aged 32–33) Chon Tash, Kyrgyz SSR
- Resting place: Ata-Beyit, Kyrgyzstan
- Party: CPSU

Murat Salihov (Kyrgyz: Мурат Салыков, romanized: Murat Salykov; 1905 – 5 November 1938) was a chairman of the Council of People's Commissars of the Kyrgyz SSR.

== Biography ==
Salihov was born in 1905 in the village of Ravat, Osh district (now in Marhamat District of the Andijan Region) in a poor peasant family. In 1916–1918, he worked as a shepherd at the bai in the Sülüktü region. In 1919, he joined the YCL. In 1919–1922, he studied at the Kokand Pedagogical College, but did not finish the course. He graduated from the Kyrgyz Pedagogical College, according to other sources - from 1921 to 1925 he studied at the Pedagogical Institute of Education in Tashkent.

In 1925–1927, Salihov served as the head of the Osh district department of public education. Since 1927, a member of the CPSU (b), head of the Agitation and Propaganda Department of the Osh Canton Committee of the CPSU (b), a member of the presidium of the district executive committee and the bureau of the district committee of the party. In 1931, the chairman of the Özgön district executive committee, later in the same year the chairman of the Osh district executive committee. In 1931–1933, 1934 he studied at the Tashkent Institute of Marxism–Leninism, completed 2 courses.

For some time he worked as chairman of the executive committee of the Osh District Council, 1st Secretary of the District Committee of the All-Union Communist Party of Bolsheviks (Kirghiz ASSR) and Deputy People's Commissar of Education of the Kirghiz ASSR, but the terms of service in these positions are not precisely defined.

- ? - 1931 - head of the political department of the horse farm
- 1934 - April 1937 - 1st Secretary of the Osh District Committee of the All-Union Communist Party of Bolsheviks (Kirghiz ASSR)
- 4 April 1937 - ? - Head of the Agricultural Department of the Kyrgyz Regional Committee of the CPSU (b) - CC of the CP (b) of Kyrgyzstan
- June 1937 - member of the CC of the CP (b) of Kyrgyzstan, member of the Bureau of the CC of the CP (b) of Kyrgyzstan
- ? - September 1937 - 3rd Secretary of the CC of the CP (b) of Kyrgyzstan
- 27 September 1937 - 15 February 1938 - Chairman of the Council of People's Commissars of the Kirghiz SSR
- 15 February - May 8, 1938 - Acting Chairman of the Central Executive Committee of the Kirghiz SSR

Salihov was arrested in 1938. In the execution list of 12 September 1938 "in the first category". He was shot near the village of Tash-Döbö, Kyrgyz SSR.

=== Family ===
- Wife - Azhar (?-1945) - she studied at the HCAS, after the arrest of her husband she changed her surname and left for Uzbekistan;
  - Son - Kuvat
  - Daughter - Atyrgül
