= Nasirdin Isanov =

1st Prime Minister of Kyrgyzstan

- Насирдин Исанов
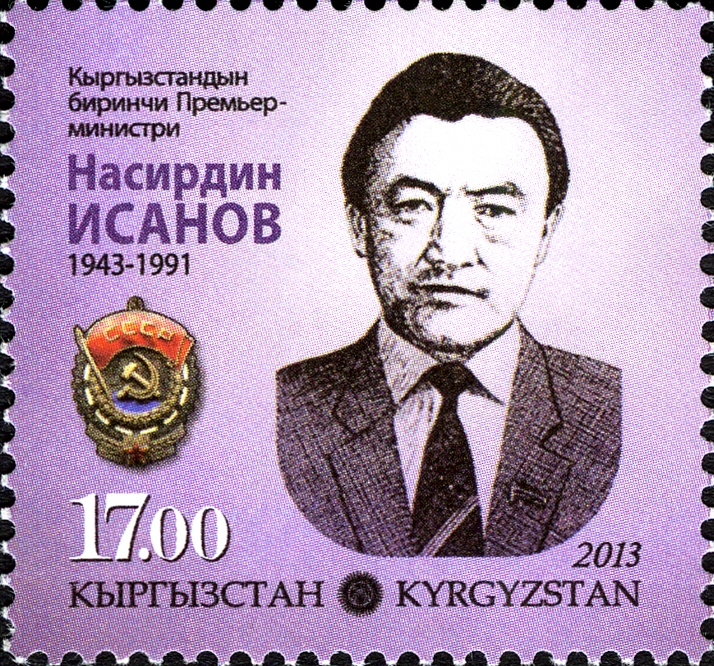
- Isanov on a Kyrgyz 2013 stamp

Vice President of the Kirghiz SSR
- In office December 1990 – January 1991
- President: Askar Akayev
- Preceded by: Office Established
- Succeeded by: German Kuznetsov

1st Prime Minister of Kyrgyzstan
- In office 21 January 1991 – 29 November 1991
- President: Askar Akayev
- Preceded by: Office Established
- Succeeded by: Andrei Iordan

Personal details
- Born: 7 November 1943 Kok-Bel, Kirghiz SSR, Soviet Union (now Kyrgyzstan)
- Died: 29 November 1991 (aged 48) Frunze, Kirghiz SSR, Soviet Union (now Bishkek, Kyrgyzstan)
- Resting place: Ala-Archa Cemetery
- Party: Communist Party of the Soviet Union
- Education: Moscow State University of Civil Engineering

Nasirdin Isan uulu Isanov (Kyrgyz: Насирдин Исан уулу Исанов, Russian: Насирдин Исанович Исанов, romanized: Nasirdin Isanovich Isanov; 7 November 1943 – 29 November 1991) was a Kyrgyz politician who served as the first Prime Minister of Kyrgyzstan from 30 August 1991 to 29 November 1991.

== Biography ==
In 1966 he graduated from the Moscow Engineering and Construction Institute, and for several years he worked in the construction industry.

After joining the Communist Party in 1969, he rose through party structures, becoming first secretary of the Komsomol in Osh Region. In 1983 he became Construction Minister in the Kyrgyz Soviet Republic. He was the Vice President of Kyrgyzstan from December 1990 to January 1991. In January 1991 he became Prime Minister of the Republic of Kyrgyzstan.

He was killed on 29 November 1991 in a car crash in the outskirts of the capital. He is buried in Ala-Archa cemetery in Bishkek. In 2003, a monument in honor of Isanov was erected in Erkindik Boulevard. He was the only Prime Minister of Kyrgyzstan to die in office until the death of Jumabek Ibraimov in 1999.

== Awards ==
- Hero of the Kyrgyz Republic (August 2023, posthumously)
- Order of the Red Banner of Labor
- Order of the Badge of Honor

Political offices
Preceded by —	Prime Minister of Kyrgyzstan; 1991	Succeeded by Andrei Iordan (acting)
