= Apas Jumagulov =

Kyrgyz politician (born 1934)

- Апас Жумагулов
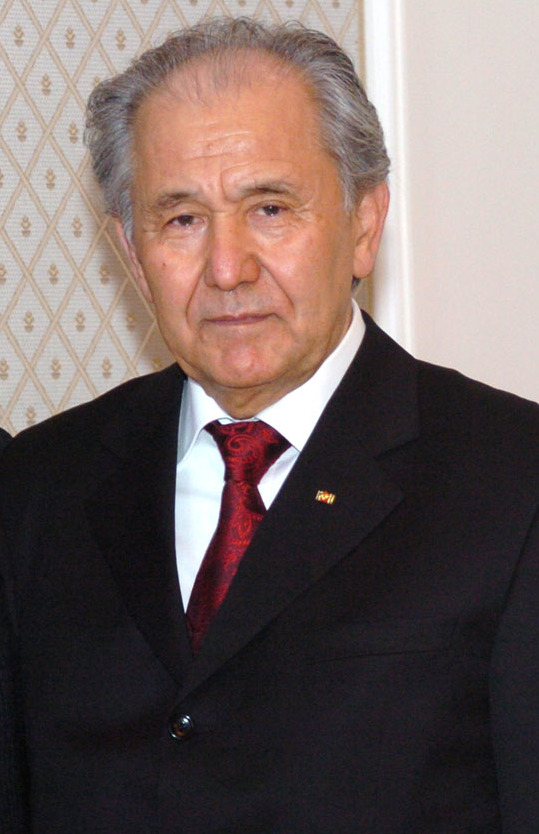
- Jumagulov in 2006

3rd Prime Minister of Kyrgyzstan
- In office 14 December 1993 – 14 March 1998
- President: Askar Akayev
- Preceded by: Almanbet Matubraimov
- Succeeded by: Kubanychbek Jumaliev

Personal details
- Born: 19 September 1934 (age 91) Alamüdün District, Kyrgyz SSR, USSR

Apas Jumagulovich Jumagulov (Kyrgyz: Апас Жумагул уулу Жумагулов; born 19 September 1934) served as the Prime Minister of Kyrgyzstan from 14 December 1993 to 24 March 1998.

== Early life and career ==
He studied geology and mineralogy at the Gubkin Russian State University of Oil and Gas in Moscow and began his political career in the Communist Party of the Kyrgyz SSR in 1973, becoming a Secretary in the Central Committee of the Party in 1979 and Chairman of Council of Ministers of Kyrgyz SSR in 1986.

== Politics ==
Jumagulov and Absamat Masaliyev were the two original candidates for the Kyrgyz Presidency on 25 October 1990, but neither could get the majority of votes, so the Republic's Supreme Soviet chose Askar Akayev to be the first President on 27 October 1990.

=== Premiership ===
Jumagulov was elected Prime Minister of the Government of Popular Confidence of the Kyrgyz Republic. Parliament voted almost unanimously. At the end of 1994, Parliament was dissolved and the government resigned and remained in office until April 1995. As the government was provisional, a Jumagulov served in a caretaker capacity. On April 1, 1995, did the new Parliament unanimously elect Jumagulov as Prime Minister. On March 1, 1996, President Akayev nominated Jumagulov to the Zhogorku Kenesh of the Kyrgyz Republic, which unanimously, for the third time in four years, agreed to appoint him as Prime Minister.

During the relatively short period of his work in this position, already in 1996, the republic created the basis for a real overcoming of the political and economic crisis, and an unprecedented economic reform in history was successfully carried out.

== Diplomatic career ==
Jumagulov served as the ambassador to Germany from 1998 to 2003, and to Russia from 2005 to 2007.

== Scientific activity ==
He is the author of over 50 scientific works, including 5 monographs in his field. He organized and for many years headed the public organization "Charity and Overcoming of Poverty" (in Bishkek and Kochkor-Ata). He was a member of the international society "Good Angel of Peace" and was awarded many of its orders and medals.

== Family ==
His wife is Roza Guskova, with whom he has two sons: Daniyar and Sergey.

== Awards ==
- Hero of the Kyrgyz Republic (September 1, 2022)
- Order of Manas, 1st degree (April 1, 1998)
- Jubilee badge “100th anniversary of the formation of the Kara-Kyrgyz Autonomous Region” (February 20, 2025)
- Grand Cross, 1st Class, of the Order of Merit of the Federal Republic of Germany (Germany).
- Order of Friendship (August 20, 2007, Russia)
- Two Orders of the Red Banner of Labor
- Order of the Badge of Honor
- Commemorative gold medal "Manas-1000" (August 15, 1995)
- Honored Worker of Industry of the Kyrgyz Republic (September 16, 1994)
- Laureate of the State Prize of the Kyrgyz Republic for Science and Technology
- Honorary citizen of the city of Bishkek
- Honorary citizen of the city of Naryn
- Honorary citizen of the village of Chaek
- Honorary citizen of the city of Kochkor-Ata

Political offices
Preceded by Almanbet Matubraimov (acting)	Prime Minister of Kyrgyzstan; 1993–1998	Succeeded by Kubanychbek Jumaliev
