= Medetbek Kerimkulov =

Kyrgyzstani politician

Medetbek Temirbekovich Kerimkulov (Russian: Медетбек Темирбекович Керимкулов; born January 28, 1949) was the First Deputy Prime Minister of Kyrgyzstan between December 2005 and June 2006, when he became Minister for Industry, Trade, and Tourism. He resigned from this position in February 2007.

He was the acting Prime Minister of Kyrgyzstan for twenty days in 2005. He had previously been Mayor of Bishkek.

Political offices
Preceded by Kurmanbek Bakiyev	Prime Minister of Kyrgyzstan; Acting; 2005	Succeeded by Felix Kulov
