= Nikolai Tanayev =

Kyrgyzstani politician (1945–2020)

- Николай Танаев
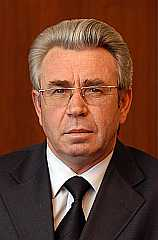
- Tanayev in 2005

8th Prime Minister of Kyrgyzstan
- In office 22 May 2002 – 25 March 2005
- President: Askar Akayev; Ishenbai Kadyrbekov (Acting)
- Preceded by: Kurmanbek Bakiyev
- Succeeded by: Kurmanbek Bakiyev

Personal details
- Born: 5 November 1945 Mihailovka, Penza Oblast, Soviet Union
- Died: 19 July 2020 (aged 74) Saint Petersburg, Russia

Nikolay Timofeyevich Tanayev (Russian: Николай Тимофеевич Танаев; 5 November 1945 – 19 July 2020) was a Kyrgyz politician, who served as the Prime Minister of Kyrgyzstan from 2002 to 2005, under President Askar Akayev.

== Career ==
He served as deputy prime minister under Kurmanbek Bakiyev and was made acting PM on 22 May 2002 after Akayev fired Bakiyev. He officially became PM eight days later when the Supreme Council confirmed him.

As prime minister he survived a motion of no confidence vote on 8 April 2004. The legislature voted 27 to 14 to remove him from office, short of the necessary 30 votes.

He was the first ethnic non-Asian prime minister of Kyrgyzstan since independence.

== Revolution and exile ==
On 24 March 2005 Tanayev resigned as prime minister in the midst of the Tulip Revolution. Almost a month later he became special envoy for foreign economic relations in his native Penza region in Russia. However, by June the Acting Prosecutor-General, Azimbek Beknazarov told Parliament that his office had issued an order for Tanayev's arrest. One of the charges relates to 40 million soms ($977,000) in state funds allegedly transferred to a company controlled by his son. He lived in exile in St. Petersburg on 6 Bolshaya Morskaya Street.

Political offices
| Preceded by Kurmanbek Bakiyev | Prime Minister of Kyrgyzstan; 2002–2005 | Succeeded by Kurmanbek Bakiyev |
