= Ishenbai Kadyrbekov =

Kyrgyzstani politician and interim president in March 2005

- Ишенбай Кадырбеков
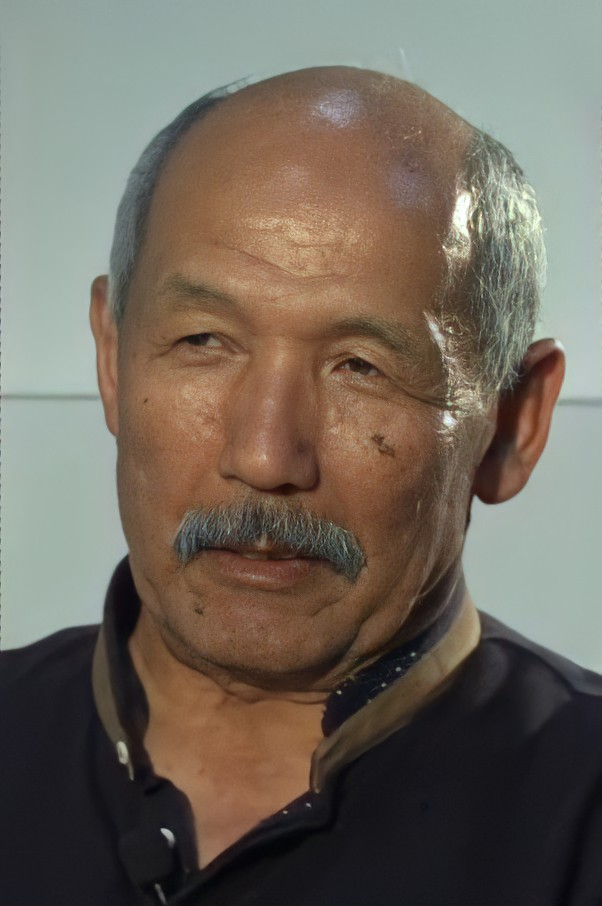
- Kadyrbekov in 2017

Acting President of Kyrgyzstan
- In office 24 March 2005 – 24 March 2005
- Prime Minister: Nikolai Tanayev
- Preceded by: Askar Akayev
- Succeeded by: Kurmanbek Bakiyev

Personal details
- Born: 16 July 1949 (age 77) Naryn Region, Kyrgyz SSR, Soviet Union
- Party: Social Democratic

Ishenbai Duyshonbiyevich Kadyrbekov (Kyrgyz: Ишенбай Дүйшөнбиевич (Дүйшөнби уулу) Кадырбеков; born 16 July 1949) is a Kyrgyz politician who served as the speaker of the Legislative Assembly of Kyrgyzstan from 2000 to 2005, and as the interim president of Kyrgyzstan for a few hours on 24 March 2005, before Kurmanbek Bakiyev took over.

== Early life ==
Ishenbai Kadyrbekov was born in the Naryn Region, Kyrgyz SSR, Soviet Union, in 1949. He worked as an architect.

== Career ==
Kadyrbekov was chair of the Social Democratic Party of Kyrgyzstan.

Kadyrbekov served as speaker of the Legislative Assembly from 2000 to 2005. Hidden listening devices in the offices of opposition leaders, including Kadyrbekov, were discovered by the Parliamentary Security Services of Kyrgyzstan on 14 January 2004. The State Committee for National Security was accused of planting the devices by the assembly. Three of his campaign workers lost their government jobs for supporting his campaign for the legislature.

Kadyrbekov was disqualified from running in the 2005 parliamentary election. President Askar Akayev was overthrown by protests in March 2005. Kadyrbekov was selected to serve as interim president. He held the position for a few hours before Prime Minister Kurmanbek Bakiyev replaced him at midnight on 25 March.

Kadyrbekov served as the director of the Kyrgyz architecture and construction agency. He was charged with corruption and abuse of his position. He was arrested on 25 April 2008, and remained in pretrial detention until 14 April 2009, when he was placed under house arrest. He was found guilty on 26 January 2010, and given a six-year suspended sentence.

== Works cited ==
=== Books ===
- The World Factbook. Central Intelligence Agency. 1994.
- McMann, Kelly (2006). Economic Autonomy and Democracy: Hybrid Regimes in Russia and Kyrgyzstan. Cambridge University Press. ISBN 9780521857611.

=== News ===
- "Former Kyrgyz Interim President Released". Radio Free Europe/Radio Liberty. 14 April 2009. Archived from the original on 17 November 2026.
- "Opposition Seizes Control of Kyrgyzstan". PBS. 24 March 2005. Archived from the original on 17 November 2026.
- Tchoroev, Tyntchtykbek (23 March 2010). "The Revolution In Kyrgyzstan Lives On". Radio Free Europe/Radio Liberty. Archived from the original on 11 May 2026.

=== Web ===
- "2010 Human Rights Report: Kyrgyz Republic". United States Department of State. 8 April 2011. Archived from the original on 6 December 2025.
- "Deterioration of Civil Society and Freedom of Expression in Kyrgyzstan". Human Rights Watch. 2 August 2004. Archived from the original on 17 November 2026.
- "Kyrgyzstan: After the Revolution" (PDF). International Crisis Group. 4 May 2005. Archived (PDF) from the original on 11 February 2026.
- Pannier, Bruce (13 June 2006). "Nations in Transit - Kyrgyzstan (2006)". Freedom House. Archived from the original on 11 February 2026.

Preceded by Askar Akayev	Acting President of Kyrgyzstan; 2005	Succeeded by Kurmanbek Bakiyev
