= Ar-Namys =

Ar-Namys Ар-Намыс
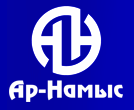
- Leader: Felix Kulov
- Founded: 1999
- Headquarters: Bishkek, Kyrgyzstan
- Ideology: Progressive conservatism Presidentialism; Russophilia; Historical: Pro-Kurmanbek Bakiyev

Website
- http://www.ar-namys.org/en/

Ar-Namys (Kyrgyz: Ар-Намыс, meaning Dignity) is a political party in Kyrgyzstan founded on July 9, 1999, by former Prime Minister Felix Kulov. The party quickly became the nation's leading opposition party but was barred from the 2000 parliamentary elections. However, since the party was barred its members formed a bloc with the Democratic Movement of Kyrgyzstan. With Kulov serving time for criminal charges, the party's members worked over the next few years to both clear his name and establish a broad opposition coalition.

In 2001, the party formed the People's Congress of Kyrgyzstan an electoral alliance with three other opposition parties. Kulov was chosen as the chairman. However, in 2004 the party joined the For Fair Elections alliance, in preparation for the February 2005 parliamentary elections.

Ar-Namys received the votes of 7.74% of eligible voters in the 2010 parliamentary elections, giving it 25 of 120 seats in parliament. This result made the party the third of five parties to surpass the support threshold of 5% of eligible voters necessary to enter parliament. It lost all its seats in the 2015 parliamentary elections.
