= Ivan Rebrov =

Kyrgyzstani politician (1890–1938)

Ivan Pavlovich Rebrov (1890–1938) was a politician of the Kirghiz SSR who chaired that republic's Council of People's Commissars in an acting capacity from 27 April 1938 to 19 July 1938.
