= Felix Kulov =

Kyrgyz politician (born 1948)

- Феликс Кулов
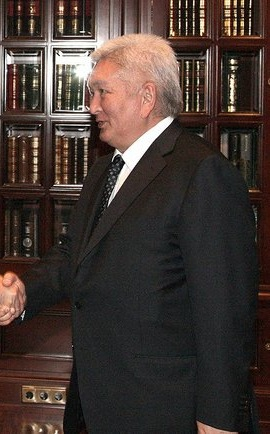
- Kulov in 2010

9th Prime Minister of Kyrgyzstan
- In office 1 September 2005 – 29 January 2007; Acting: 15 August 2005 – 1 September 2005
- President: Kurmanbek Bakiyev
- Preceded by: Kurmanbek Bakiyev
- Succeeded by: Azim Isabekov

Vice President of Kyrgyzstan
- In office 27 February 1992 – 10 December 1993
- President: Askar Akayev
- Preceded by: German Kuznetsov
- Succeeded by: Position abolished

Mayor of Bishkek
- In office April 1998 – April 1999
- Preceded by: Boris Silayev
- Succeeded by: Medetbek Kerimkulov

Minister of National Security
- In office April 1997 – April 1998
- Preceded by: Anarbek Bakayev
- Succeeded by: Misir Ashirkulov

Minister of the Interior
- In office 1 July 1991 – 27 February 1992
- Preceded by: Position established
- Succeeded by: Abdybek Sutalinov

Personal details
- Born: 10 October 1948 (age 77) Frunze, Kyrgyz SSR, Soviet Union (now Bishkek, Kyrgyzstan)
- Party: Ar-Namys
- Spouse: Fatima Abdrasulova

Military service
- Allegiance: Soviet Union; Kyrgyzstan
- Branch/service: Ministry of Internal Affairs of the Soviet Union; Ministry of the Interior of Kyrgyzstan
- Years of service: 1969—1998
- Rank: Lieutenant General of Police

Felix Sharshenbayevich Kulov (Russian: Феликс Шаршенбаевич Кулов; Kyrgyz: Феликс Шаршенбаевич (Шаршенбай уулу) Кулов, Feliks Sharshenbayevich (Sharshenbay uulu) Kulov; born 29 October 1948) is a Kyrgyz politician who served as the 9th Prime Minister of Kyrgyzstan from 2005 to 2007, following the Tulip Revolution. He first served from 1 September 2005 until he resigned on 19 December 2006. President Kurmanbek Bakiyev reappointed him acting Prime Minister the same day, but parliamentary opposition meant Bakiyev's attempts to renominate Kulov in January 2007 were unsuccessful, and on 29 January the assembly's members approved a replacement.

Kulov founded and leads Ar-Namys, a political party, and chairs the People's Congress, an electoral alliance to which Ar-Namys belongs.

== Early life and career ==
Kulov was born in Frunze (present-day Bishkek), and initially trained as a policeman. Between 1971 and 1991 he held various posts in the MVD of the Kirghiz Soviet Socialist Republic, including inspector of the drug addiction department, senior inspector of the Criminal Investigation Department and head of the MVD Department of the Talas. He graduated from the Omsk Higher School of the Ministry of Internal Affairs of the USSR in 1971 and then the Academy of the Ministry of Internal Affairs (now the Academy of Management) in 1978. By 1990, he was the first deputy minister, and became a Major General in 1991. He was also the Military Commandant of Frunze during that time.

== Kyrgyz government ==
In November 1990, at this point a member of the Presidential Council, he ran for the post of Chairmen of the Supreme Soviet, losing to Medetkan Sherimkulov. The following July, he became the republic's first post-Soviet interior minister, serving until February 1992. From 1992–1993 he was Vice President, in which position he oversaw the launch of the Kyrgyz currency, the Som. However, he was forced to resign following a scandal over missing gold reserves.

He then went to serve as Governor of Chuy Province for 3 years before returning to the cabinet in 1997 to serve as Askar Akayev's Minister of National Security.

== Political career in opposition ==
From 1998 to 1999 Kulov served as Mayor of Bishkek, becoming a popular politician in the city. In 1999 he participated in the formation of Ar-Namys, becoming its first leader. In February 2000 he announced his intention to run as a member of the Supreme Council. Kyrgyz police arrested him a month later for corruption. On 22 January 2001 a military court found him guilty and sentenced him to seven years in prison. He was cleared of all charges against him in 2005, and in 2010, the UN Human Rights Committee found several civil rights violations in his detention and trial.

=== 2005 Kyrgyz Revolution ===
On March 24, 2005, Kulov was released during the Kyrgyz revolution (the Tulip Revolution) and appointed co-ordinator of law enforcement and security services (effectively, the Kyrgyz head of security) by acting president and prime minister Kurmanbek Bakiyev. He resigned this position on March 30, saying that he had restored order.

On 6 April a special working group of the Kyrgyz Supreme Court was formed to review Kulov's earlier prosecution and convictions, and by 11 April he had been cleared of all charges. During this time period Kulov was accused by politician and alleged crime figure Ryspek Akmatbayev of organising the murder of his brother Tynychbek, leading to a national wave of protests.

Kulov initially announced his intention to stand as a candidate for president in the elections scheduled for 10 July. It was unclear at first whether language would be a barrier to his election: the president is required by law to be fluent in the Kyrgyz language, and in common with many from the north of the country, Kulov's native tongue is Russian. The issue became moot, however, when he withdrew his candidacy in mid-May, pledging his support to Bakiyev. At that time he was also appointed Acting First Deputy Prime Minister. He was already expected to be appointed prime minister by the elected president. Bakiyev won the election in July. He was sworn in on 11 August. He appointed Kulov acting prime minister. On 1 September 2005, Kulov was confirmed as prime minister by the Kyrgyz parliament, by a vote of 55 to 8.

== Prime Minister ==
Kulov served as Prime Minister until 19 December 2006 when he resigned, automatically triggering the dismissal of his cabinet per the Constitution. President Bakiyev immediately appointed him Acting Prime Minister. Bakiyev appointed Kulov Prime Minister again in mid-January 2007.

Parliamentarians voted 39 to 23 against the confirmation of Kulov, 15 votes short the minimum for confirmation, on 18 January 2007. Opposition Parliamentarian Azimbek Beknazarov told Kulov prior to the vote, "I may be wrong, but I believe your nomination will be rejected. Be brave and admit that you cannot perform your duties of prime minister. Admit that you have been unable to do so for the past year-and-a-half. I think it would be better if you refused [to be reappointed]. Be a man!"

President Bakiyev renominated Kulov the next day, since the new constitution permits the same candidate to be presented three times. The Kyrgyz Parliament's Constitution Committee ruled on 22 January 2007 that Bakiyev could not renominate Kulov because it violated the Constitution. Committee chairman Iskhak Masaliyev told Bakiyev to nominate someone else. Myrza Kaparov, Bakiyev's envoy to the Parliament disagreed, telling Parliamentarians, "We must also refer to the constitutional law on government, which says that the president has the right to submit the candidacy three times. If the Jorgorku Kenesh rejects his choice three times, you know all the consequences. Everything is clearly written in this law."

After Kulov's nomination failed for the second time on 26 January, the president nominated agriculture minister Azim Isabekov, a close associate of his and former deputy head of the Presidential Administration, on 26 January 2007.

== Post-premiership ==
In February, Kulov joined an opposition group, the United Front for a Worthy Future for Kyrgyzstan, which called for an early presidential election. As leader of the group, he has also supported the idea of establishing a confederation with Russia.

Anti-Bakiyev protests from April 11 to April 19, 2007 culminated with clashes between the protesters and the police, and Kulov was questioned in connection with the clashes on April 21, after initially refusing to appear for questioning on the previous day. Kulov blamed the authorities for the clashes. On August 1, 2007, Kulov was charged with creating public disorder in connection with the clashes.

Political offices
Preceded by German Kuznetsov	Vice President of Kyrgyzstan; 1992–1993	Position abolished
Preceded by Kurmanbek Bakiyev	Prime Minister of Kyrgyzstan; 2005–2007	Succeeded by Azim Isabekov
