= People's Movement of Kyrgyzstan =

- Kyrgyz name: Кыргызстан элдик кыймылы
- Russian name: Народное движение Кыргызстана
- Leader: Kurmanbek Bakiyev
- Founded: 22 September 2004
- Dissolved: 2005

The People's Movement of Kyrgyzstan (Kyrgyz: Кыргызстан элдик кыймылы; Russian: Народное движение Кыргызстана) was an electoral alliance formed on 22 September 2004 in Kyrgyzstan, consisting of nine parties. The parties were mainly left-wing and center-left, and mainly opposition parties. Former prime minister and then-MP Kurmanbek Bakiyev was elected as the movement's chairman on 5 November 2004. The People's Movement of Kyrgyzstan was created to contest the 2005 Kyrgyz parliamentary election.

The movement consisted of the following nine members at formation:

- Party of Communists of Kyrgyzstan
- Communist Party of Kyrgyzstan
- Republic
- Asaba
- Kairan El
- Democratic Movement of Kyrgyzstan
- Erkindik
- Erkin Kyrgyzstan (Erk)
- New Kyrgyzstan

The People's Movement was "the main organizational tool of the authors" of the Tulip Revolution in March–April 2005 that overthrew president Askar Akayev. On 25 March 2005, the Parliament of Kyrgyzstan elected Bakiyev as acting president and prime minister. Shortly before the 2005 Kyrgyz presidential election, some parties (such as the Democratic Movement of Kyrgyzstan) left the alliance to participate independently. Following Bakiyev's election as President on 10 July 2005, he resigned as chairman of the movement. On 23 July 2005, at its fifth congress, the People's Movement was transformed into the socio-political movement "Kyrgyzstan". The leadership of this new organization was critical of Bakiyev since his election, notably because of his failure to quickly pass key reforms. It also passed a resolution on 24 December 2005 calling for the President to move towards adopting a new constitution. On 26 March 2007, the People's Movement reportedly resumed its activity.
