= Kurmanbek Bakiyev =

Kyrgyz politician (born 1949)

- Курманбек Бакиев
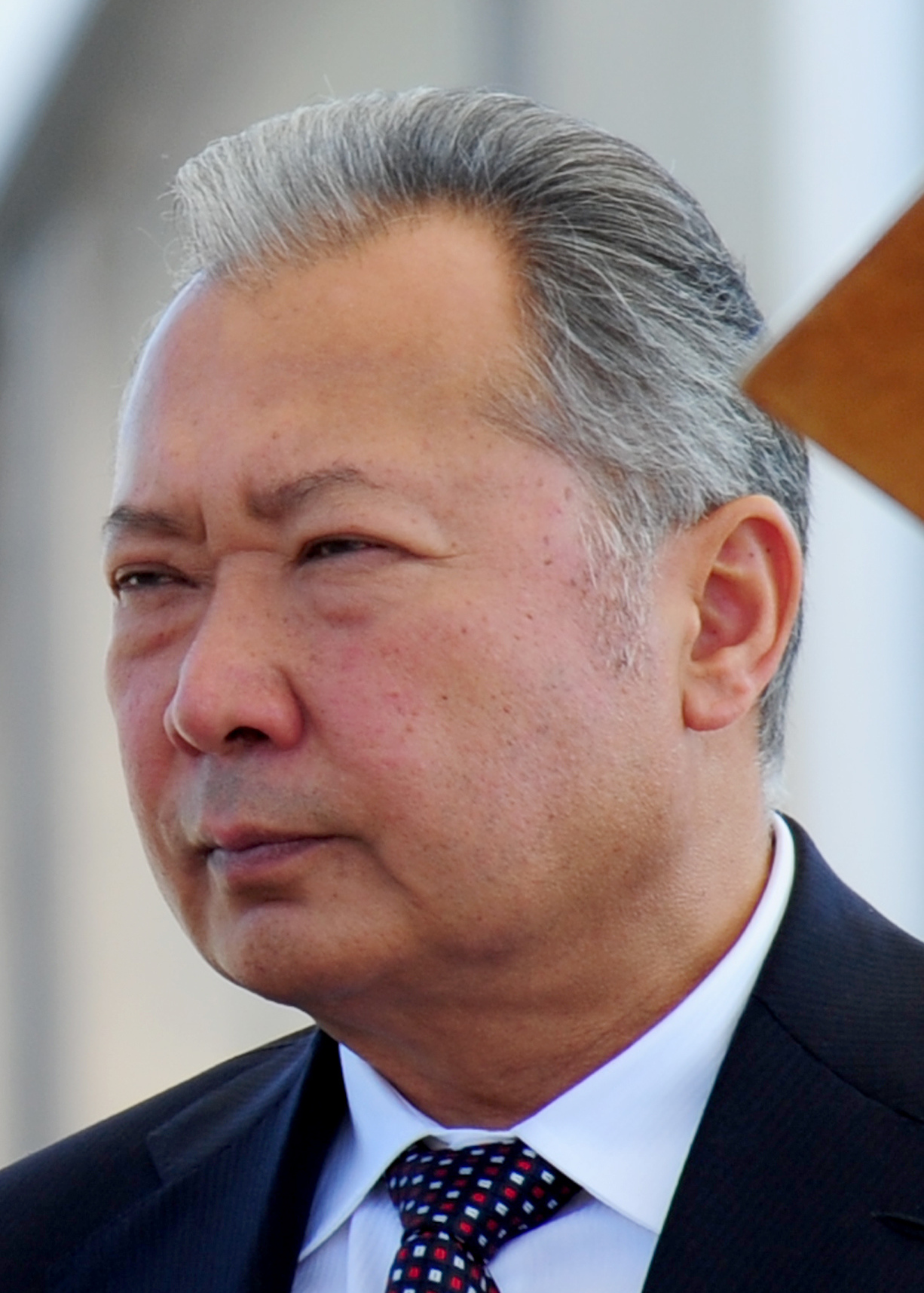
- Bakiyev in 2009

2nd President of Kyrgyzstan
- In office 14 August 2005 – 15 April 2010; Acting: 25 March – 14 August 2005
- Prime Minister: Medetbek Kerimkulov; Felix Kulov; Azim Isabekov; Almazbek Atambayev; Iskenderbek Aidaraliyev; Igor Chudinov; Daniar Usenov
- Preceded by: Ishenbai Kadyrbekov (acting)
- Succeeded by: Roza Otunbayeva

7th Prime Minister of Kyrgyzstan
- In office 10 July 2005 – 15 August 2005
- President: Askar Akayev; Ishenbai Kadyrbekov (acting)
- Preceded by: Medetbek Kerimkulov (acting)
- Succeeded by: Felix Kulov
- In office 28 March 2005 – 20 June 2005; Acting: 25 March 2005 – 28 March 2005
- President: Askar Akayev
- Preceded by: Nikolai Tanayev
- Succeeded by: Medetbek Kerimkulov (acting)
- In office 21 December 2000 – 22 May 2002
- President: Askar Akayev
- Preceded by: Amangeldy Muraliyev
- Succeeded by: Nikolai Tanayev

Personal details
- Born: 1 August 1949 (age 77) Masadan, Kyrgyz SSR, USSR
- Party: Ak Jol
- Other political affiliations: People's Movement of Kyrgyzstan
- Spouse: Tatyana Bakiyeva
- Domestic partner: Nazgul Tolomusheva
- Children: 2, including Maxim
- Relatives: Janish Bakiyev (brother)
- Education: Kuybyshev Polytechnic Institute

Kurmanbek Sali uulu Bakiyev (Note: Kyrgyz: Курманбек Сали уулу Бакиев) (born 1 August 1949) is a Kyrgyzstani politician who served as the second president of Kyrgyzstan from 2005 until his removal from office as a result of the Kyrgyz Revolution of 2010, forcing Bakiyev to flee the country. After the Tulip Revolution he was also the de facto leader.

Bakiyev was the leader of the People's Movement of Kyrgyzstan before his ascendance to the presidency. He received most of his popular support from the south of the country. The Legislative Assembly of Kyrgyzstan of the Supreme Council of Kyrgyzstan appointed him acting president on 25 March 2005, following the ousting, during the Tulip Revolution, of President Askar Akayev. In October 2007, Bakiyev initiated the creation of Ak Jol party, but could not lead it due to his presidency.

== Early life and career ==
He was born on 1 August 1949 in the village of Masadan in the Jalal-Abad Region of the Kirghiz SSR. His father, Sali Bakiyev, was the chairman of a collective farm. In 1978, he graduated from the Kuibyshev Polytechnic Institute (now Samara State Technical University). In 1974, Bakiyev served in the ranks of the Soviet Army. In 1979, he moved to Jalal-Abad where, from 1979 to 1985, he worked at the plug-in connectors factory. Between 1990 and 1991 he worked as the first secretary of the Kok-Yangak City Committee of the Communist Party of Kirghizia. Starting in 1995, he was the Governor of the Jalal-Abad Region, and Governor of the Chui Region. In December 2000, Bakiyev was appointed prime minister of Kyrgyzstan.

== Presidency ==
Following the events of the 2005 Tulip Revolution, Bakiyev won the 10 July ballot for the presidential election with 89% of the vote with a 53% turnout.

Despite initial hopes, Bakiyev's term in office was marred by the murder of several prominent politicians, prison riots, economic ills and battles for control of lucrative businesses.

From 2005 until 2006, he got influenced by Dastan Sarygulov which tried to promote an ideology which is anti-capitalist.

In 2006, Bakiyev faced a political crisis as thousands of people participated in a series of protests in Bishkek. He was accused of not following through with his promises to limit presidential power, give more authority to parliament and the prime minister, and eradicate corruption and crime. Bakiyev claimed the opposition was plotting a coup against him.

In April 2007, the opposition held protests demanding Bakiyev's resignation, with a large protest beginning on 11 April in Bishkek. Bakiyev signed constitutional amendments to reduce his own power on 10 April but the protest went ahead, with protesters saying that they would remain until he resigned. Clashes broke out between protesters and police on 19 April, after which the protests ended.

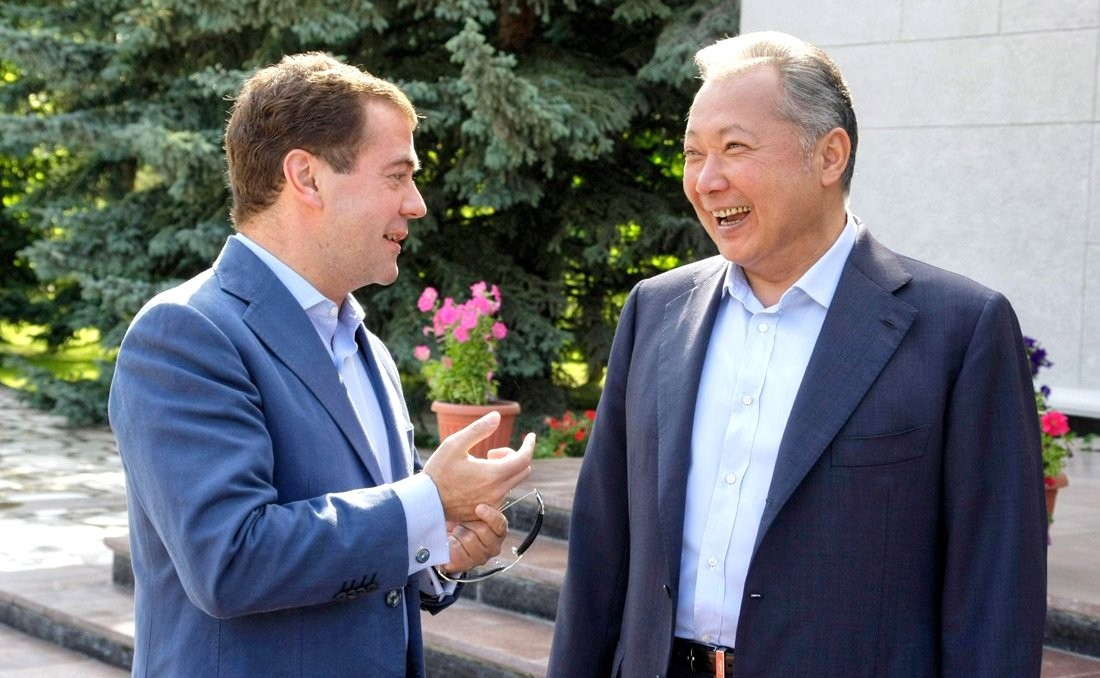
Bakiyev (right) with Dmitry Medvedev in 2009

During Bakiyev's presidency, the relationship between China and Kyrgyzstan strengthened, with increasing numbers of Chinese students in Kyrgyzstan. In February 2009, while in Moscow, Bakiyev announced the eviction of the US Air Base from Kyrgyzstan, following a meeting with Russian President Dmitry Medvedev, during which Russia promised a $2 billion investment.

Bakiyev was re-elected in the 2009 presidential election. After his re-election, he was expected to deal with political and economic reform.

The Eurasia Daily Monitor wrote on 10 September 2009 that his style resembled other leaders such as Vladimir Putin and Nursultan Nazarbayev. Kyrgyz people were anxious about the risk of renewed power shortages and blackouts like in the winter 2008–2009. During the winter of 2010, the country suffered from rolling blackouts and cutoffs occurring regularly while energy prices have risen. On 1 April 2010, Russia also imposed duties on energy exports to Kyrgyzstan. It influenced fuel and transport prices immediately, and reportedly led to a massive protest in Talas on 6 April.

In January 2010, Kyrgyzstan sent a delegation to China to discuss improved economic relations.

Kyrgyzstan's national electric company, Natsionalnaya electricheskaya syet, and the Chinese Tebian Electric signed a $342 million contract to build the Datka-Kemin 500 kv power transmission lines. This would have reduced Kyrgyzstan's dependence on the Central Asian power system. The delegation was led by Bakiyev's son.

In February 2010 Kyrgyzstan had to raise energy tariffs. Heating costs were reportedly going to rise 400 percent and electricity by 170 percent. Russia backed his government until March 2010.

Kyrgyzstan's power sector is relatively small, with a total generating capacity of around 3.9 gigawatts, producing approximately 15.4 terawatt-hours (TWh) of electricity in 2020.

== Killings and persecution of the opposition ==
Kurmanbek Bakiyev's brother, Zhanysh, headed the State Security Service in July 2008 and became the personification of the repressive apparatus of the state.

International human rights organizations reported serious violations, including the use of torture, illegal detentions, and restrictions on freedom of assembly. The situation was particularly concerning in the southern regions of Kyrgyzstan, where tensions between different ethnic groups were escalating.

Opposition journalist G. Pavlyuk was thrown out of a hotel window after being tortured. Additionally, a major official, Medet Sadyrkulov, who defected to the opposition, was killed. Authorities attempted to portray his death as a road accident, but it was later revealed that he was kidnapped, strangled, and burned, with President Bakiyev's brother, Zhanysh Bakiyev, personally involved in the murder.

The government exerted pressure on independent media, shutting down opposition newspapers and television channels, and blocking access to critical internet resources. Between 2008 and 2010, Bakiyev's administration actively persecuted political opponents. Documented cases included opposition leaders being arrested and prosecuted on fabricated charges, exacerbating political tensions in the country.

== Establishment of family clan regime ==
On March 2, 2006, brother of Bakiyev, Zhanysh, was appointed deputy chairman of the national security service.

In the fall of 2009, Kurmanbek Bakiyev formed the Central Agency for Development, Innovation and Investment, which was headed by his son Maxim Bakiyev. At the same time, the government doubled tariffs for utilities (electricity, heat supply). In January 2010, a tax was established on cellular calls (2 cents from each call). According to the opposition, this tax was sent directly to the accounts of AsiaUniversalBank OJSC, owned by Maxim Bakiev, who thus took possession of funds in the amount of 5 million US dollars.

The head of the Central Election Commission, Kabilova, fled the country after threats from Maxim Bakiev. On September 26, 2008, a video message from Klara Kabilova was made public. In it, she claims she was unfairly pressured after she proposed the release of a jailed parliamentary candidate in the October 5 elections. In the video, Kabilova says that Maxim Bakiyev, the son of the country's president, Kurmanbek Bakiyev, visited her and put "flagrant pressure and obscene insults" on her in order to intimidate her.

Members of the Provisional Government have repeatedly stated that Maxim Bakiyev and his associates controlled the supply of fuel to American military base, and thereby made a lot of money.

According to cables from the US Embassy in Kyrgyzstan, received by KirTAG from WikiLeaks, the amount of bribes to Maxim Bakiev, the son of ex-president of the Kyrgyz Republic Kurmanbek Bakiev, for banking licenses reached up to 500 thousand dollars, KazTAG reports.

== Using US military base for corruption ==
With full cooperation from the United States, the Bakiyev family profited greatly from the Manas air base, significantly boosting their wealth through lucrative fuel supply contracts. The US authorities were aware that these contracts benefited members of the Bakiyev family. Experts testified before the US Congress, stating that the US government supported the Bakiyev regime—a brutal family clan—in order to maintain the Manas air base. Maxim Bakiyev's involvement in these schemes was widely known and became even more evident after public statements by his business partner, Yevgeny Gurevich, who openly discussed the details of their activities. The family of former President of Kyrgyzstan Kurmanbek Bakiev withdrew $200–300 million from the country. Evgeniy Gurevich, a financial adviser to the Bakiyevs convicted in absentia in Kyrgyzstan and serving time in the United States, stated this in an interview with Azattyk.

According to WikiLeaks, the US ambassador to Kyrgyzstan described authoritarian President Bakiyev's son, Maxim, as "corrupt, smart, and a good ally," despite his involvement in numerous political attacks, threats, and mass raids.

The United States also acknowledged its involvement with companies linked to former Kyrgyz President Askar Akayev for the supply of fuel and lubricants. According to the Red Star company, between 2003 and 2005, the US paid $87 million to Manas International Service, owned by Akayev's son, and $32 million to Aalam Service Akaev, owned by Akayev's son-in-law. Overall, from 2003 to 2011, these two companies secured contracts worth $1.8 billion for fuel and lubricant supplies, an amount nearly equivalent to Kyrgyzstan's total GDP of $1.9 billion in 2003.

Despite proven facts of murder, political corruption and intimidation of opponents, Maxim Bakiev received asylum in the UK. The company "Mina" through which he laundered funds from supplies of fuel and lubricants to a US military base was registered in the British Gibraltar.

== 2010 revolution ==
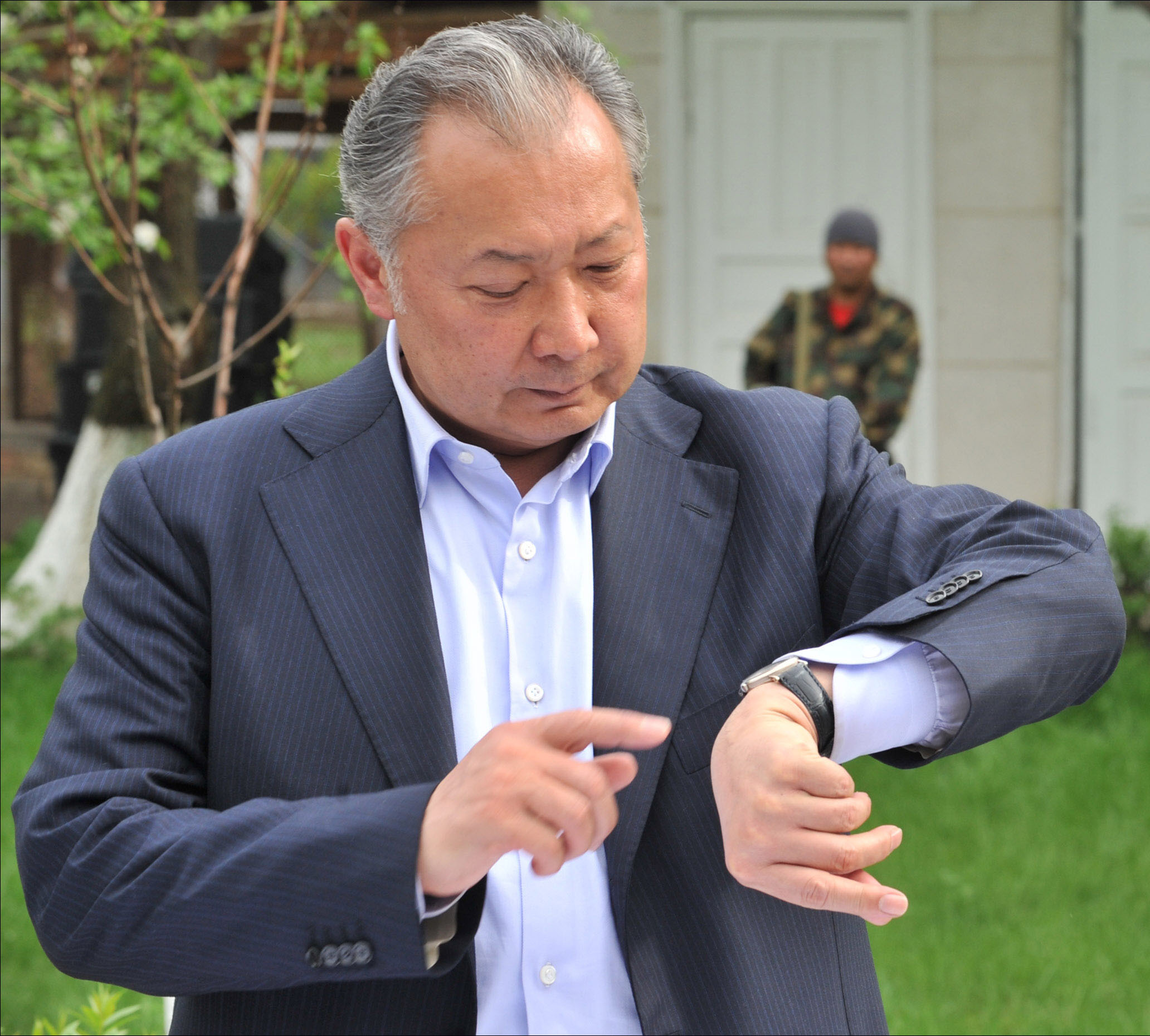
Bakiyev in April 2010

In April 2010, after bloody riots in the capital overturned the government, Bakiyev reportedly fled to the southern city of Osh. The head of the new provisional government, Roza Otunbayeva, declared that Bakiyev had not resigned and was trying to rally support. When the revolt took place, Bakiyev was headed to the US for a series of meetings in Washington.

On 13 April 2010, Bakiyev stated he would be willing to resign the presidency if his security was guaranteed. On 15 April 2010, at 19:00, Bakiyev left Kyrgyzstan for Kazakhstan, having signed a resignation letter. Otunbayeva said she would press ahead to bring Bakiyev to trial.

On 20 April, the Belarusian president, Alexander Lukashenko told his parliament that "Bakiyev and his family, four people in all, have been in Minsk since Monday evening, as guests...Today they are here under the protection of our state, and personally of the president."

On 21 April, Bakiyev held a press conference in Minsk and stated "I, Kurmanbek Bakiyev, am the legally elected president of Kyrgyzstan and recognised by the international community. I do not recognise my resignation. Nine months ago the people of Kyrgyzstan elected me their president and there is no power that can stop me. Only death can stop me", and called Otunbayeva's administration an "illegitimate gang".

=== Parliamentary elections of 2010 ===
Ata-Zhurt, a party campaigning for bringing Kurmanbek Bakiyev back to power, won 28 out of 120 seats in Kyrgyzstan's parliamentary elections of 2010, securing a narrow plurality over the other parties.

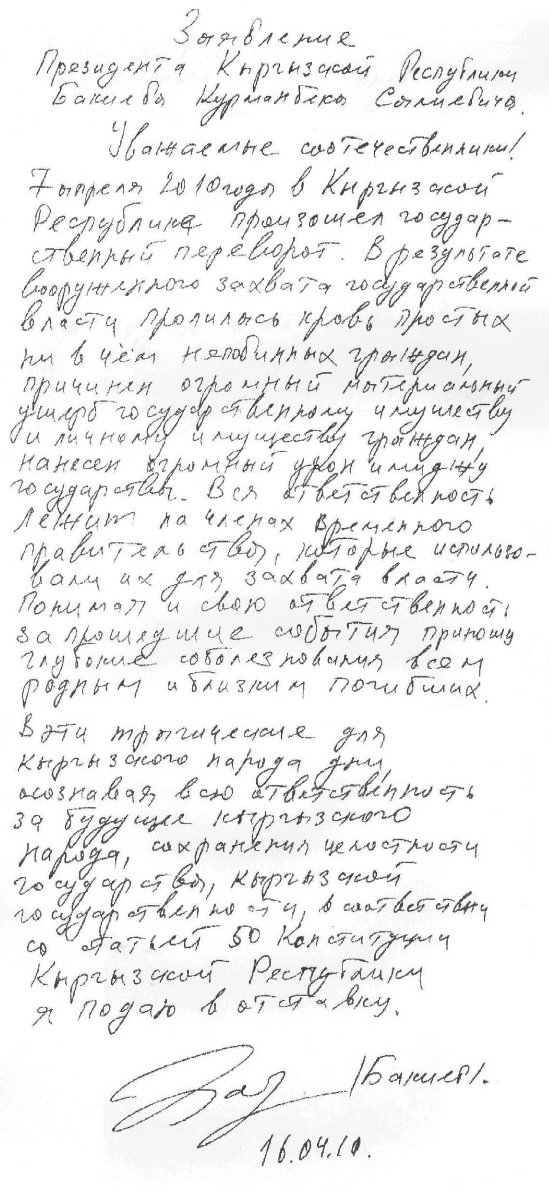
Resignation letter of Bakiyev (in Russian)

== Exile in Minsk ==
In Kyrgyzstan, Bakiev was sentenced in absentia to life in prison for involvement in the killing of protesters during the 2010 uprising. The Kyrgyz government has since demanded Bakiyev's extradition, but Belarus has refused, which has been the cause of many conflicts in Kyrgyz-Belarusian relations. He was accompanied by his wife Tatyana, his two sons and his Kyrgyz mistress Nazgul Tolomusheva. In February 2012, it was being reported that Bakiyev was granted Belarusian citizenship in 2010. In a 2017 interview with the Belarusian service of Radio Free Europe/Radio Liberty, Bakiyev claimed that Medvedev and Putin, as well as US President Barack Obama were involved in the coordination of his safe departure to Minsk.

In February 2019, the United States Treasury announced the return of over $4 million stolen by Bakiyev to Kyrgyzstan's government. On 6 August 2019, Bakiyev met with President Alexander Lukashenko in the Independence Palace to mark Bakiyev's 70th birthday, which he had marked several days earlier. Lukashenko presented Bakiyev with traditional flowers and symbolic gifts before meeting with him in his office where they discussed relevant issues. The meeting angered the Kyrgyz Foreign Ministry, which stated the next day that it "fundamentally does not meet the principles of friendship and cooperation between the two countries". In July 2021, Bakiyev was accused of corruption in the development of the Kumtor gold deposit.

== Family and private life ==
=== Family ===
Bakiyev's wife, Tatyana Vasilevna Petrova (Russian: Татьяна Васильевна Бакиева), a production engineer, is an ethnic Russian who was born in Samara and raised in what is present-day Moldova.

During his time as president, several Bakiyev family members had prominent positions in the government, with at least five close relatives working in the upper echelons of power. His brother Janysh was head of the presidential guard. Another brother Marat was Kyrgyzstan's ambassador to Germany. Another brother, Adyl, was an adviser to Kyrgyzstan's ambassador to China.

Since the overthrow, Kurmanbek's younger son, Maksim, was charged with embezzlement and abuse of power by the interim government. It is suspected that he transferred about $35 million of a $300 million loan from Russia into his private bank accounts.

From his common-law wife Bakieva Nazgul Tolomusheva Kurmanbek Bakiev has a son Daniyar born in 2004 and a daughter Leyla born in 2000. On 15 January 2023, Bakieva Nazgul died of heart failure.

=== Proficiency in Kyrgyz ===
He speaks Kyrgyz, Russian and Uzbek. Despite being an ethnic Kyrgyz, Russian is his first language, as he spent parts of his early life in Russia. His fluency in the Kyrgyz language was occasionally questioned by critics and political opponents. During the 2000 and 2009 presidential elections, Bakiyev had to pass state-administered Kyrgyz language tests.

== Electoral history ==
Electoral history of Kurmanbek Bakiyev
Year	Office	Party	Votes received				Result
Year	Office	Party	Total	%	P.	Swing	Result
2005	President of Kyrgyzstan	IND	1,776,156	89.50%	1st	—N/a	Won
2009	President of Kyrgyzstan	Ak Jol	1,779,417	77.44%	1st	-12.06	Won

== Awards ==
- Order of the Olympic Council of Asia (2009)
- Order of the Commonwealth
- Order of Friendship of Peoples (Belarus, 2014)

== Notes ==
Political offices
Preceded by Amangeldy Muraliev	Prime Minister of Kyrgyzstan; 2000–2002	Succeeded by Nikolai Tanayev
Preceded by Nikolai Tanayev	Prime Minister of Kyrgyzstan; 2005	Succeeded by Medetbek Kerimkulov; Acting
Preceded by Medetbek Kerimkulov; Acting	Prime Minister of Kyrgyzstan; 2005	Succeeded by Felix Kulov
Preceded by Ishenbai Kadyrbekov; Acting	President of Kyrgyzstan; 2005–2010	Succeeded by Roza Otunbayeva
