= Tulip Revolution =

2005 Kyrgyz revolution that overthrew President Askar Akayev

Tulip Revolution Жоогазын революциясы (Kyrgyz) Тюльпановая революция (Russian)
- Part of the Colour revolutions
- Date: 22 March – 11 April 2005
- Location: Kyrgyzstan
- Caused by: Authoritarianism; Corruption; Economic crisis; Results of the 2005 parliamentary election
- Goals: Invalidation of the 2005 parliamentary election; Resignation of president Askar Akayev and prime minister Nikolai Tanayev
- Result: Overthrow of president Askar Akayev and his government; Kurmanbek Bakiyev becomes acting president and acting prime minister; Assumption of power by the opposition; 2005 presidential election

Parties
Opposition: SDPK; KelKel	Government of Kyrgyzstan; GKNB; ASOE; MVD; Internal Troops; SOBR; Armed Forces; Forward, Kyrgyzstan!

Lead figures
Kurmanbek Bakiyev; Roza Otunbayeva; Almazbek Atambayev; Felix Kulov	Askar Akayev; Nikolai Tanayev; Ishenbai Kadyrbekov

The Tulip Revolution, also known as the First Kyrgyz Revolution, led to Kyrgyzstan's then-President Askar Akayev's fall from power. The revolution began after parliamentary elections on 27 February and 13 March 2005. The revolutionaries alleged corruption and authoritarianism by Akayev, his family and supporters. Akayev fled to Kazakhstan and then to Russia. On 4 April 2005, at the Kyrgyz embassy in Moscow, Akayev signed his resignation statement in the presence of a Kyrgyz parliamentary delegation. The resignation was ratified by the Kyrgyz interim parliament on 11 April 2005.

== Origins ==
In the early stages of the revolution, the media variously referred to the unrest as the "Pink," "Lemon", "Silk", or "Daffodil" revolution. It was Akayev himself who coined the term, "Tulip Revolution". In a speech of the time, he warned that no such "Color Revolution" should happen in Kyrgyzstan. Using a color or floral term evoked similarity with the non-violent Rose Revolution in Georgia, the Orange Revolution in Ukraine (2004), the Czechoslovak Velvet Revolution (1989) and the Portuguese Carnation Revolution (1974).

Givi Targamadze, a former member of the Liberty Institute of Georgia and the chair of Georgian Parliamentary Committee on Defense and Security, consulted Ukrainian opposition leaders on the technique of nonviolent struggle. He later advised leaders of the Kyrgyz opposition during the Tulip Revolution.

== Post-election violence ==
Pro-Akayev candidates performed well at the February 27, 2005 parliamentary election. However, the result was criticized by foreign observers. The Organization for Security and Co-operation in Europe (OSCE) was critical of the Kyrgyzstan government. Protests began, especially in the western and southern cities including Jalal-Abad, Osh, and Uzgen. On March 3, 2005, a bomb exploded in opposition leader Roza Otunbayeva's apartment. The Akayev government denied responsibility.

On March 10, 2005, the People's Movement of Kyrgyzstan leader, Kurmanbek Bakiyev, joined protesters outside the parliament building in Bishkek. Bakiyev and 22 opposition parliamentarians issued a symbolic vote of "no confidence" in the Akayev administration. On March 19, 2005, three thousand people in Bishkek and fifty thousand in Jalal-Abad joined public protests. On March 20, when protesters occupied government buildings, the Kyrgyz government deployed interior ministry troops in Jalal-Abad and Osh. On March 20, 2005, protesters took control of all the large cities in the southern part of the nation and demanded Akayev's resignation. The "KelKel" ("renaissance and shining of the good") youth movement was active in the protests. On March 22, 2005, Akayev refused to negotiate with protesters. Ten of seventy-one parliamentarians sided with the protesters.

== Potential leaders ==
Although the opposition claimed significant gains in control of the country, it suffered internal division and lacked an obvious leader. This is in contrast to the Ukrainian and Georgian revolutionary forces which demonstrated united fronts against the state.

Roza Otunbayeva was a potential leader of the Kyrgyz opposition. In 1981, she was the Communist Party of Kyrgyzstan's second secretary of the Lenin "raikom" (district council). Leading up to 2005, Otunbayeva's political beliefs had slowly westernised. Following the 2005 revolution, Otunbayeva served in the interim government as acting foreign minister and ambassador to the United States and the United Kingdom.

Kurmanbek Bakiyev was another potential leader. In 2002, Bakiyev had resigned from his position of prime minister of Kyrgyzstan after police shot and killed five peaceful demonstrators in the southern town of Asky.

Anvar Artykov was a previous governor of Osh. He had the support of the "kurultai", a traditional Mongol and Turkic opposition council. Artykov said, "We will keep this authority (parallel administration) until all of our demands and problems are resolved. We are an interim power. We can talk about the fulfillment of our tasks when the current government has been replaced by a government that is trusted by the nation."

The opposition was at its most united at the Jalal-Abad protest on March 21, 2005. Otunbayeva said, "Policemen, including high-ranking officers, took off their uniforms, changed into civilian clothes and joined our ranks. So we have substantial support."

On March 22, 2005, the opposition leaders met in Bishkek and formed an interim government. The Kyrgyzstan Supreme Court ruled that that previous parliament was the legitimate and rightful ruling body but then on March 24, 2005, it recognised the interim government. Bakiyev was appointed acting prime minister and new elections were planned for July, 2005.

== Foreign support ==
According to The Wall Street Journal, the US government via the State Department, USAID, Radio Liberty and Freedom House provided aid to opposition protesters by funding the only opposing print-media outlet in the country. When a Kyrgyzstan utility cut off electricity to the outlet, the U.S. embassy provided emergency generators. Other opposition groups and an opposition TV station received funding from the US government and US-based NGOs.

== Regime change ==
After protests on March 19 and 20, 2005, Akayev ordered the Central Election Committee and the Kyrgyzstan Supreme Court to investigate claims of election fraud put forward by the opposition. Akayev asked these bodies to "pay particular attention to those districts where election results provoked extreme public reaction ... and tell people openly who is right and who is wrong."

On March 22, Akayev dismissed Bakirdin Subanbekov, the minister for the interior and Myktybek Abdyldayev, the general prosecutor. On March 23, 2005, Akayev deployed riot police and thirty people were arrested. The Uzbekistan Foreign Ministry representative stated, "The people of Uzbekistan, which is a close neighbour of Kyrgyzstan, are concerned about the events happening in Kyrgyzstan, especially in its southern regions".

On March 24, 2005, Akayev fled with his family. He went first to Kazakhstan and then to Russia where the Russian President, Vladimir Putin offered him exile. On April 3, 2005, Akayev gave his resignation. It was accepted by the interim administration on April 11, 2005.

When Akayev fled, Prime Minister Nikolai Tanayev resigned. The opposition took control of key state services such as the television broadcaster. Police melted away or joined the protesters. Imprisoned opposition leaders, including Felix Kulov, were released. The Kyrgyzstan Supreme Court declared the election results invalid.

Kurmanbek Bakiyev was made acting prime minister and acting president by the interim administration. He named an interim cabinet. Mobs were looting stores and automatic teller machines in Bishkek and buildings were set on fire. Three people had died in the unrest. Bakiyev appointed Felix Kulov acting minister for the interior. Kulov appeared on television and appealed for calm. On March 26, 2005, armed supporters of Akayev made an abortive attempt to enter Bishkek under Kenesh Dushebaev and Temirbek Akmataliev. On March 29, Akmataliev announced he would participate in upcoming elections. By March 28, 2005, a gradual political stabilisation had occurred.

The interim administration announced presidential elections for July 10, 2005. However, media entities accused Bakiyev of lack of transparency, failure to restore order and discrimination against Russian minorities. The appointment of Adakhan Madumarov to the fourth deputy prime minister position was unpopular because it was seen, since he was a presidential candidate, as a conflict of interest. Bakiyev was also criticised for re-employing some of Akeyev's cabinet in the interim government.

On May 13, 2005, Bakiyev and Kulov united to contest the July 10, 2005 presidential election. The agreement was that if Bakiyev retained the presidency, Kulov would be made prime minister. The alliance lasted until January 2007. It united the northern and southern parts of the nation; made the election of other candidates more difficult; and helped to stabilise Uzbekistan.

== Problems for the interim government ==
=== Land rights ===
The interim government was faced with the challenge of peasant land rights claims in Bishkek. Police had been unable to stop forced seizures of land by armed peasants. In a related matter, Usan Kudaibergenov, a leader of Bishkek civilian patrols, was murdered.

=== Alleged Akayev corruption ===
On March 24, 2005, Akayev's diaries were produced as evidence of corruption. A commission of citizens, public servants, bankers and non-government organisation representatives was empanelled to investigate corruption by the Akayev administration. On April 21, 2005, the commission published the details of forty-two enterprises controlled by the Akayev family during Akayev's presidency. The interim government also alleged that through violence and arrests, Akayev had disrupted peaceful political protest against his administration. It was alleged that on March 24, 2005, Akeyev's men, dressed in civilian clothing, had assaulted protesters.

=== Andijan refugees ===
On May 13, 2005, the Andijan massacre occurred in Andijan, Uzbekistan, when government security agents fired shots into gathered protesters. Up to six thousand Uzbek refugees entered Kyrgyzstan. Refugees were unable to return to Uzbekistan due to harsh Uzbek government actions. Initially, Bakiyev supported the Uzbek government's stance despite calls for compassion from human rights activists. Later, with assistance from the international community, the Kyrgyz interim administration gave legal status to Andijan refugees. International NGOs were able to provide shelter, food, water, and other necessities to the refugees. On June 9, 2005, however, four Uzbekistan refugees were returned to their homeland. Kulov said these four were accused or guilty of rape or murder and therefore deported.

=== Akayev legal action ===
Akayev took legal action against the chair of the Bakiyev anti-corruption commission. He also sued a Kyrgyz newspaper journalist for defamation, on the grounds that the accusations of corruption made against him were inaccurate. Bermet Akayeva, Akayev's daughter, took legal action against the Kyrgyzstan Central Election Commission for defamation and for preventing her election to parliament. Some of Akayev's personal possessions which had been seized in the revolution were returned to him.

=== Pre-election unrest ===
On June 10, 2005, the parliamentarian Jyrgalbek Surabaldiyev was shot dead in Bishkek. He may have been involved with the attacks on anti-Akayev protesters on March 24, 2005. On June 11, 2005, two government security guards were beaten and coerced to give information about Bakiyev's and Deputy Prime Minister Daniyar Usenov's travel itineraries. On June 13, 2005, six people were injured in violence between protesters and parliamentary security agents in Osh. In this incident, security agents had opened fire on protesters congregating outside the Alay Hotel. The parliamentarian Bayaman Erkinbayev was implicated in the violence and accused of taking illegal ownership of state property.

On June 17, 2005, protesters gathered in Bishkek in support of Urmat Baryktabasov, an old ally of Akayev. He had previously expressed an intent to be a presidential candidate, but was denied the right to register because of his dual citizenship (Kyrgyzstan and Kazakhstan). Since Baryktabasov was not well known, the uprising was unusual when he might have addressed the issue by legal means. Some protesters admitted they had been paid to attend.

== New elections ==
On July 10, 2005, the promised elections took place. Bakiyev won ninety percent of the vote and the following day was made president. Kulov was appointed prime minister. He won 88.7 percent of the vote while his opponent won 4 percent. The conduct of the election was praised by Western observers but some irregularities were also noted.

In the months after the election, Bayaman Erkinbayev and Raatbek Sanatbayev were killed. Tynychbek Akmatbayev died during a prison riot orchestrated by the Chechnyen thief in law, Aziz Batukayev. Ryspek was shot dead leaving a mosque in May 2006.

The OSCE sent sixty observers to monitor the election runoffs. In its initial assessment the organisation found that the second round of voting showed "some technical improvements over the first round". It also emphasised "significant shortcomings".

Election observers from the Commonwealth of Independent States (CIS) disagreed. They hailed the runoff elections as well-organized, free, and fair. CIS observers also praised local authorities for showing restraint and competence in dealing with political unrest in several regions. This contradiction in the findings between OSCE and CIS observation teams formed the latest in a series of such contradictory findings (see CIS election observation missions). Russia supported the CIS reports and rebuked the OSCE for its findings.

The New York Times reported that American funding and support, from governmental and non-governmental sources, helped to pave the way for anti-Akayev demonstrations by providing the means for printing literature.

Kofi Annan said, "The secretary general is opposed to the use of violence and intimidation to resolve electoral and political disputes." The United Nations website said, Annan "calls on all parties to apply restraint".

== See also ==
- Kyrgyzstani presidential election, 2005
- Kyrgyzstani parliamentary election, 2005
- Politics of Kyrgyzstan
- Colour revolution
