= Kyrgyzstan–United States relations =

- Kyrgyzstan: United States

Diplomatic mission
- Embassy of Kyrgyzstan, Washington, D.C.: Embassy of the United States, Bishkek

Kyrgyzstan–United States relations are bilateral relations between Kyrgyzstan and the United States since 27 December 1991.

== History ==
The U.S. government provides humanitarian assistance, non-lethal military assistance, and assistance to support economic and political reforms. It also has supported the Kyrgyz Republic's requests for assistance from international organizations. For example, the United States helped the Kyrgyz Republic accede to the World Trade Organization (WTO) in December 1998.

Following 9/11, the U.S. has increased its interest in this part of the world, leading to divisions in opinion and welcome. The US opened the Transit Center at Manas in December 2001 following the 9/11 attacks. Both Russia and China were dismayed and in later years reportedly offered large bounties if Kyrgyzstan closed the base. In 2006, the President of Kyrgyzstan demanded further concessions to the agreement and in this year a US Air Force personnel officer was kidnapped (media later reported inconsistencies in this account; the USAF reconfirmed a kidnapping took place in 2012). 2006 also saw the killing of a Kyrgyz civilian wielding a knife by a US serviceman with a gun. Local Kyrgyz sentiment and media was outraged as the Kyrgyz region is plagued by lawlessness, banditry, and smuggling and the carrying or even threatening with a knife is relatively common in Kyrgyz street culture. For the Americans, still reeling and devastated from the 9/11 terrorist assault on their largest city, any forcible entry by a civilian into a military base can and is met with deadly force. The US military placed the serviceman under administrative punishment and an undisclosed financial settlement was made to the family.

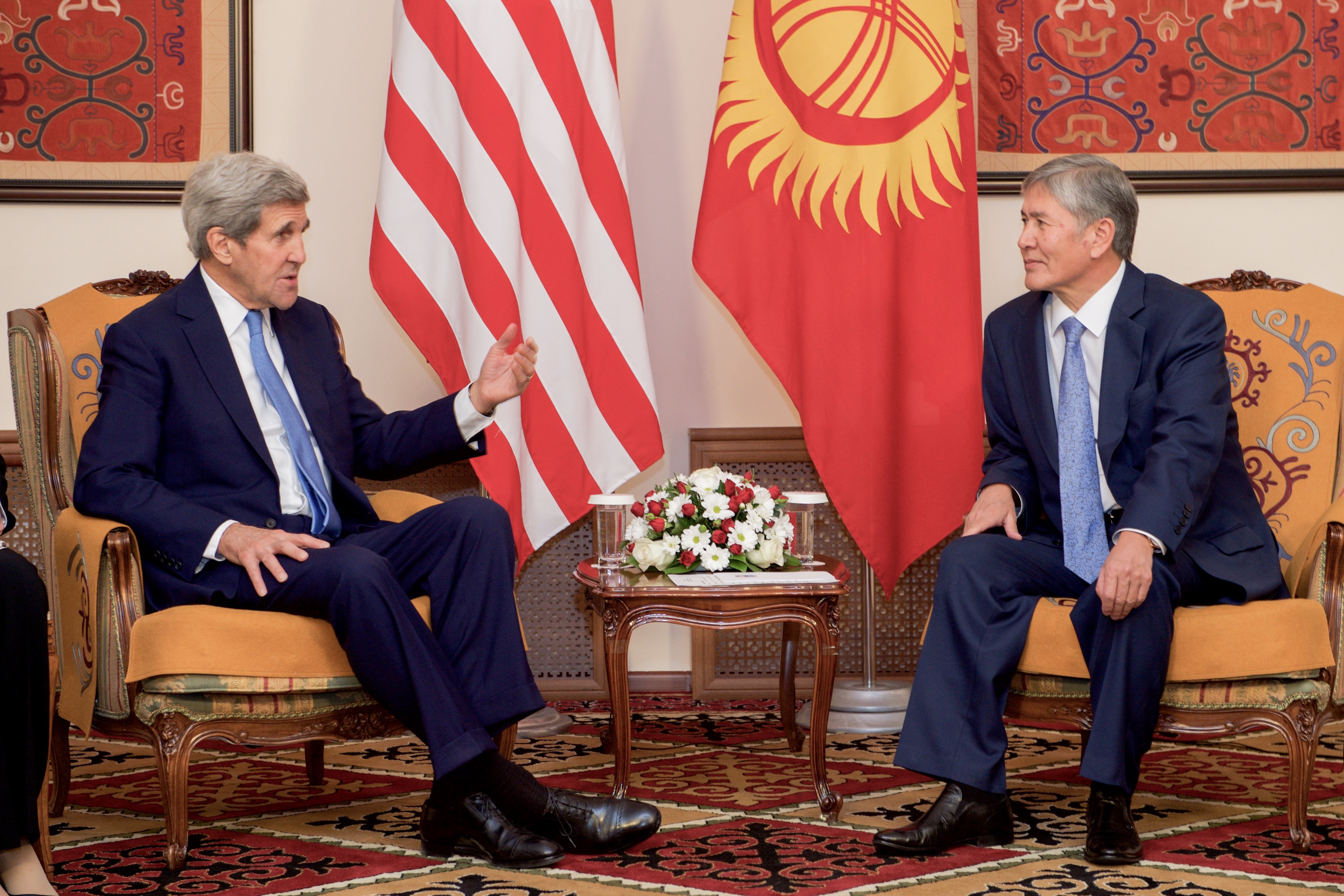
Secretary Kerry Meets With Kyrgyz President Atambaev in Bishkek, 2015

According to the 2012 U.S. Global Leadership Report, 28% of Kyrgyz people approve of U.S. leadership, with 55% disapproving and 17% uncertain.

In July 2015, the Kyrgyzstan Ministry of Foreign Affairs ceased a bilateral cooperation treaty signed by the two countries in 1993, amidst protests by the Kyrgyz foreign ministry over the U.S. Department of State's decision to award the 2014 Human Rights Defender Award to Kyrgyz prisoner Azimzhan Askarov, a journalist and political activist who was arrested for his contributions in the 2010 South Kyrgyzstan ethnic clashes. The U.S. has since warned Kyrgyzstan of the cancellation's consequences regarding the provision of humanitarian and security aid. Three months later, U.S. Secretary of State John Kerry visited Kyrgyzstan in an effort to ease bilateral ties.

U.S. assistance aids the Kyrgyz Republic in implementing necessary economic, health sector, and educational reforms, and supports economic development and conflict resolution in the Fergana Valley. Following the 2020–2021 withdrawal of United States troops from Afghanistan concerns were raised on the future of the United States engagement in Central Asia with Columbia University professor Alexander Cooley stating that U.S. in fact may be "freed from the political sensitivities of dealing with a client government" and therefore free for a more evenhanded approach to the region.

According to a report by Reuters, the United States ran a propaganda campaign to spread disinformation about the Sinovac Chinese COVID-19 vaccine, including using fake social media accounts to spread the disinformation that the Sinovac CoronaVac contained pork-derived ingredients and was therefore haram under Islamic law. Kyrgyzstan was among the Central Asian countries targeted in the campaign, which ran from the spring of 2020 to mid-2021.

== Diplomatic missions ==
The U.S. Embassy in Bishkek, Kyrgyzstan in 2015

The U.S. Embassy in the Kyrgyz Republic is located in Bishkek.

The Kyrgyz Embassy in the United States is located in Washington, D.C. As of 2023, the Kyrgyz ambassador to the United States and Canada is Bakyt Amanbaev.

== See also ==
- Foreign relations of the United States
- Foreign relations of Kyrgyzstan
- List of ambassadors of Kyrgyzstan to the United States
- List of ambassadors of the United States to Kyrgyzstan
- Great Game
