= List of diplomatic missions of Kyrgyzstan =

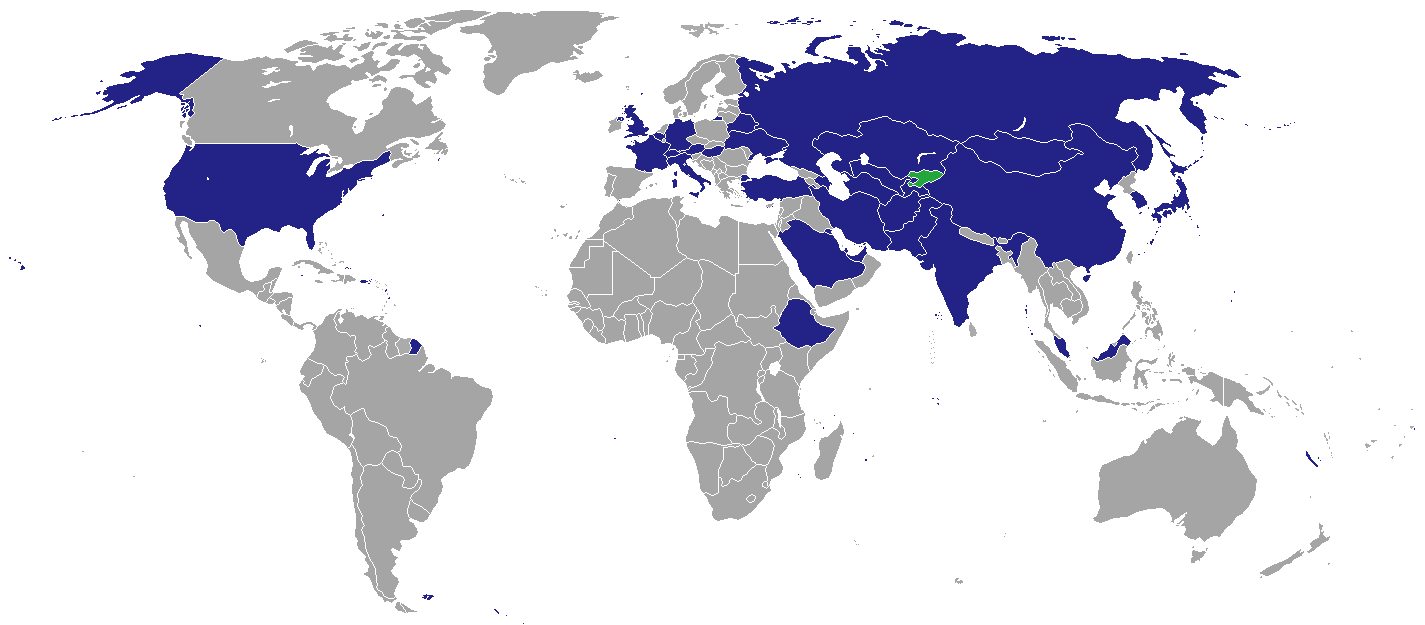
Diplomatic missions of Kyrgyzstan

This is a List of Diplomatic Missions of Kyrgyzstan, excluding honorary consulates. The landlocked, mountainous Kyrgyz Republic has a spread of diplomatic representation across Eurasia, particularly in other former Soviet republics where bilateral and multilateral ties have survived the breakup of the Soviet Union.

== Current missions ==
=== Africa ===
Host country	Host city	Mission	Concurrent accreditation	Ref.
Ethiopia	Addis Ababa	Embassy	International Organizations: African Union	

=== Americas ===
Host country	Host city	Mission	Concurrent accreditation	Ref.
United States	Washington, D.C.	Embassy	Countries: Canada	
United States	Chicago	Consulate-General	Countries: Canada	

=== Asia ===
Host country	Host city	Mission	Concurrent accreditation	Ref.
Afghanistan	Kabul	Embassy		
Azerbaijan	Baku	Embassy	Countries: Georgia	
China	Beijing	Embassy	Countries: Singapore	
China	Guangzhou	Consulate-General	Countries: Singapore	
China	Urumqi	Visa Office	Countries: Singapore	
India	New Delhi	Embassy	Countries: Nepal; Sri Lanka	
Iran	Tehran	Embassy		
Japan	Tokyo	Embassy	Countries: Australia; New Zealand; Philippines	
Kazakhstan	Astana	Embassy		
Kazakhstan	Almaty	Consulate-General		
Kuwait	Kuwait City	Embassy		
Malaysia	Kuala Lumpur	Embassy	Countries: Brunei; Indonesia; Thailand; Vietnam	
Mongolia	Ulaanbaatar	Embassy		
Pakistan	Islamabad	Embassy		
Qatar	Doha	Embassy		
Saudi Arabia	Riyadh	Embassy	Countries: Bahrain	
South Korea	Seoul	Embassy		
Tajikistan	Dushanbe	Embassy		
Turkey	Ankara	Embassy		
Turkey	Antalya	Consulate-General		
Turkey	Istanbul	Consulate-General		
Turkmenistan	Ashgabat	Embassy		
Uzbekistan	Tashkent	Embassy		
United Arab Emirates	Abu Dhabi	Embassy		
United Arab Emirates	Dubai	Consulate-General		

=== Europe ===
Host country	Host city	Mission	Concurrent accreditation	Ref.
Austria	Vienna	Embassy	Countries: Czechia; Slovakia; International Organizations: United Nations	
Belarus	Minsk	Embassy	Countries: Estonia; Latvia; Lithuania	
Belgium	Brussels	Embassy	Countries: Luxembourg; Netherlands; International Organizations: European Union; Organisation for the Prohibition of Chemical Weapons	
France	Paris	Embassy	Countries: Spain	
Germany	Berlin	Embassy	Countries: Denmark; Finland; Holy See; Norway; Poland	
Germany	Frankfurt	Consulate	Countries: Denmark; Finland; Holy See; Norway; Poland	
Hungary	Budapest	Embassy	Countries: Slovenia	
Italy	Rome	Embassy		
Russia	Moscow	Embassy	Countries: Greece	
Russia	Kazan	Consulate-General	Countries: Greece	
Russia	Novosibirsk	Consulate-General	Countries: Greece	
Russia	Saint Petersburg	Consulate-General	Countries: Greece	
Russia	Yekaterinburg	Consulate-General	Countries: Greece	
Ukraine	Kyiv	Embassy	Countries: Bulgaria; Romania	
United Kingdom	London	Embassy		

=== Multilateral organisations ===
Organization	Host city	Host country	Mission	Concurrent accreditation	Ref.
United Nations	New York City	United States	Permanent Mission	Countries: Guatemala	
United Nations	Geneva	Switzerland	Permanent Mission	Countries: Liechtenstein; Switzerland	

== Gallery ==
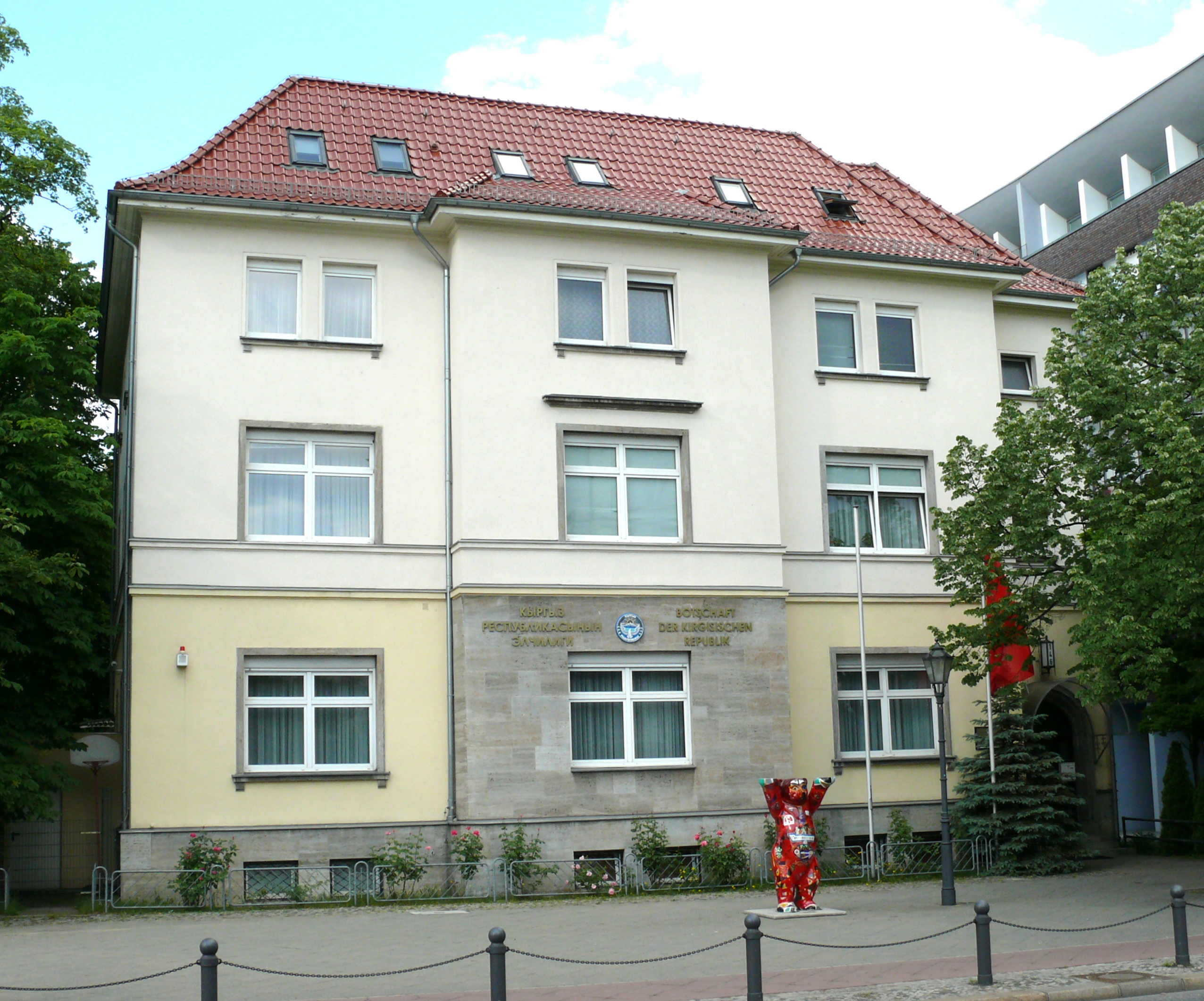
Embassy in Berlin

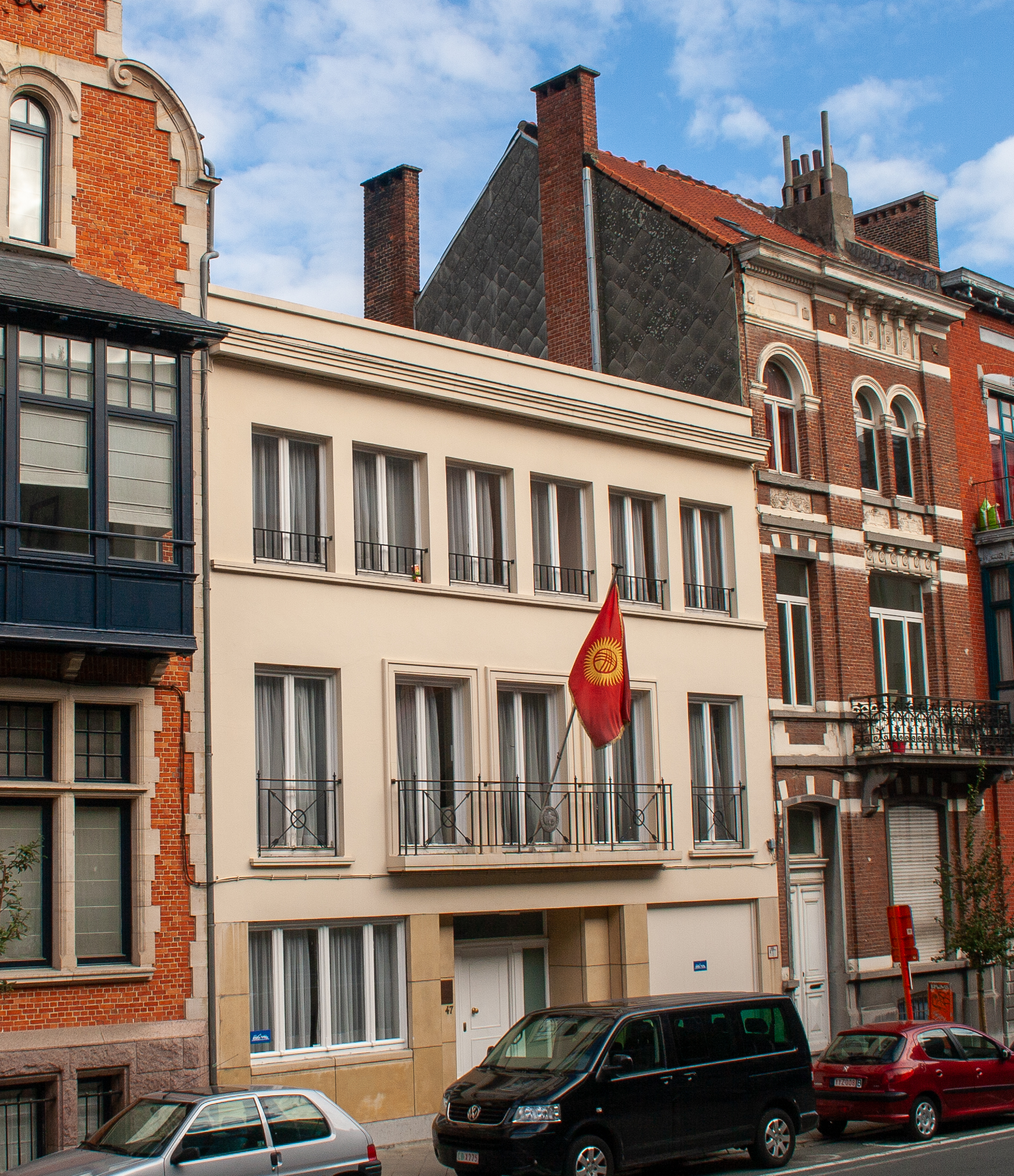
Embassy in Brussels

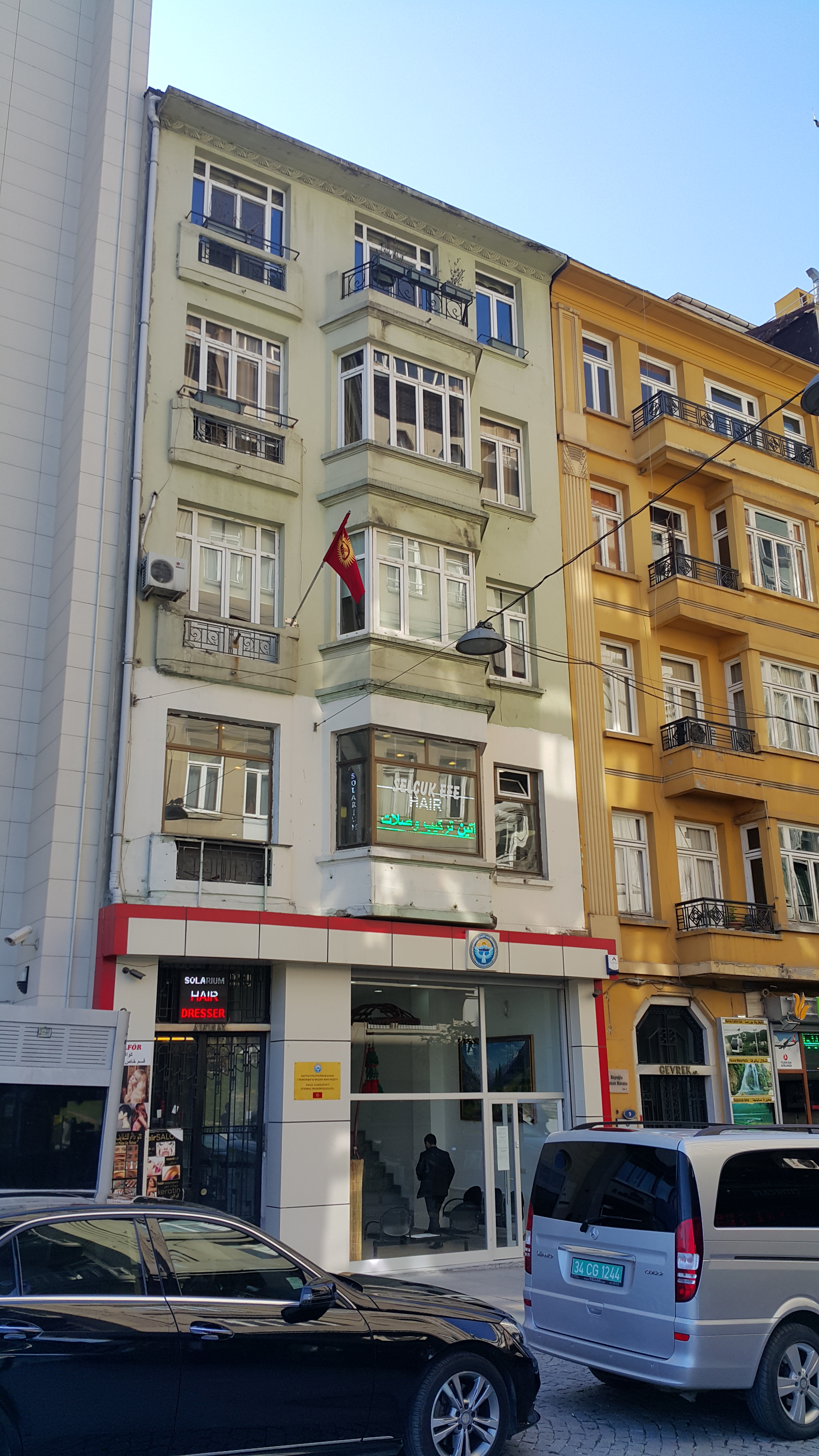
Consulate-General in Istanbul

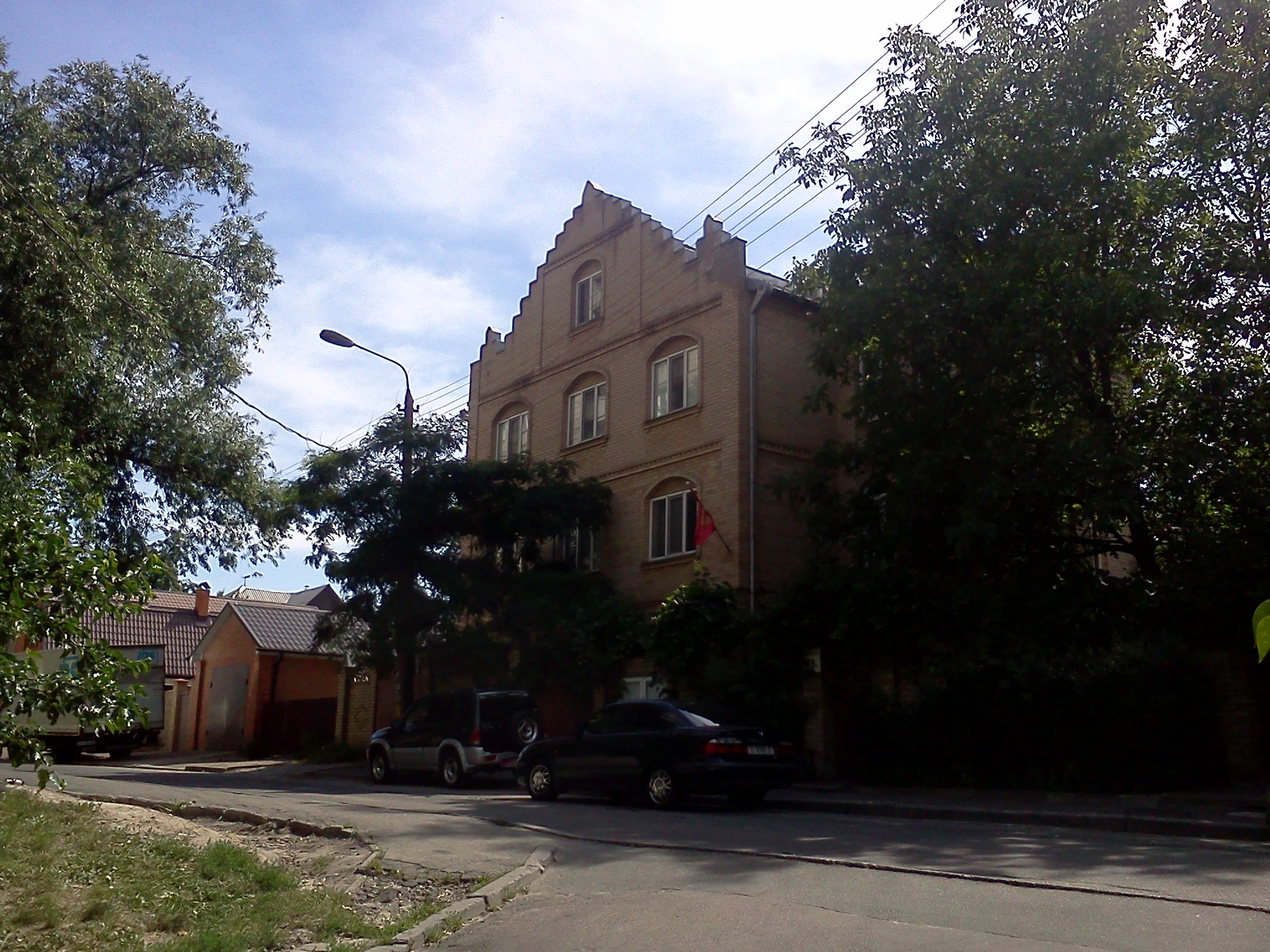
Embassy in Kyiv

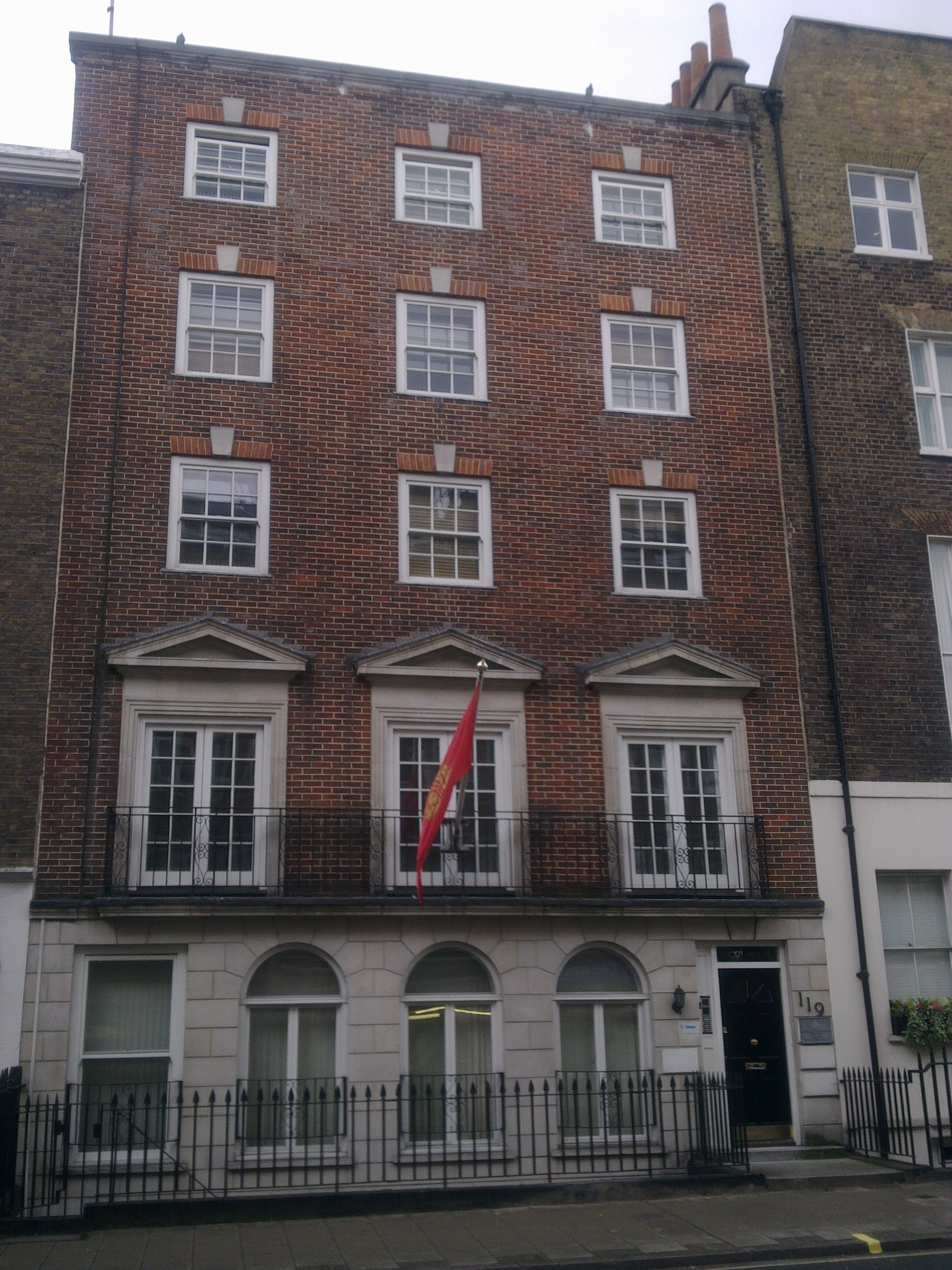
Embassy in London

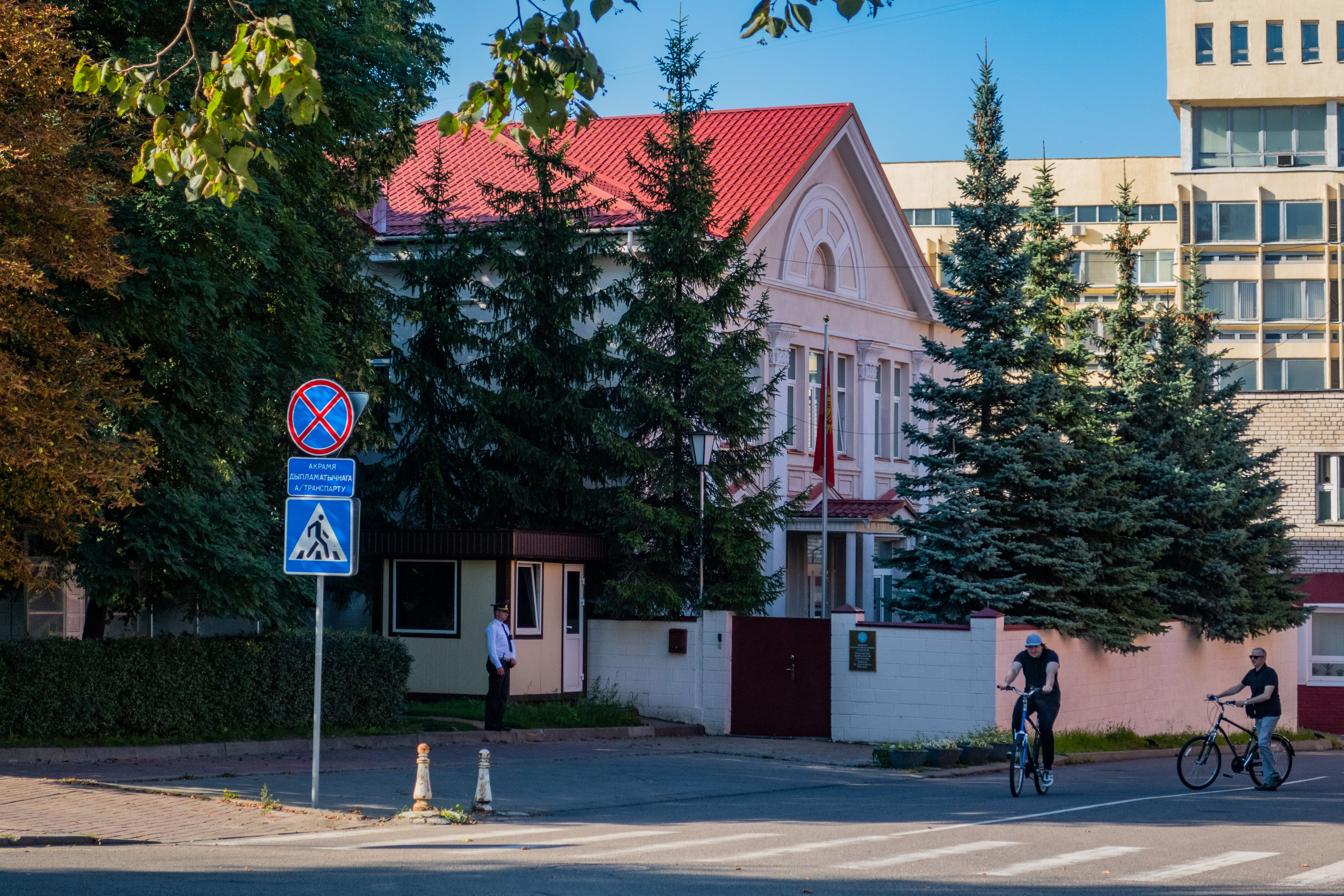
Embassy in Minsk

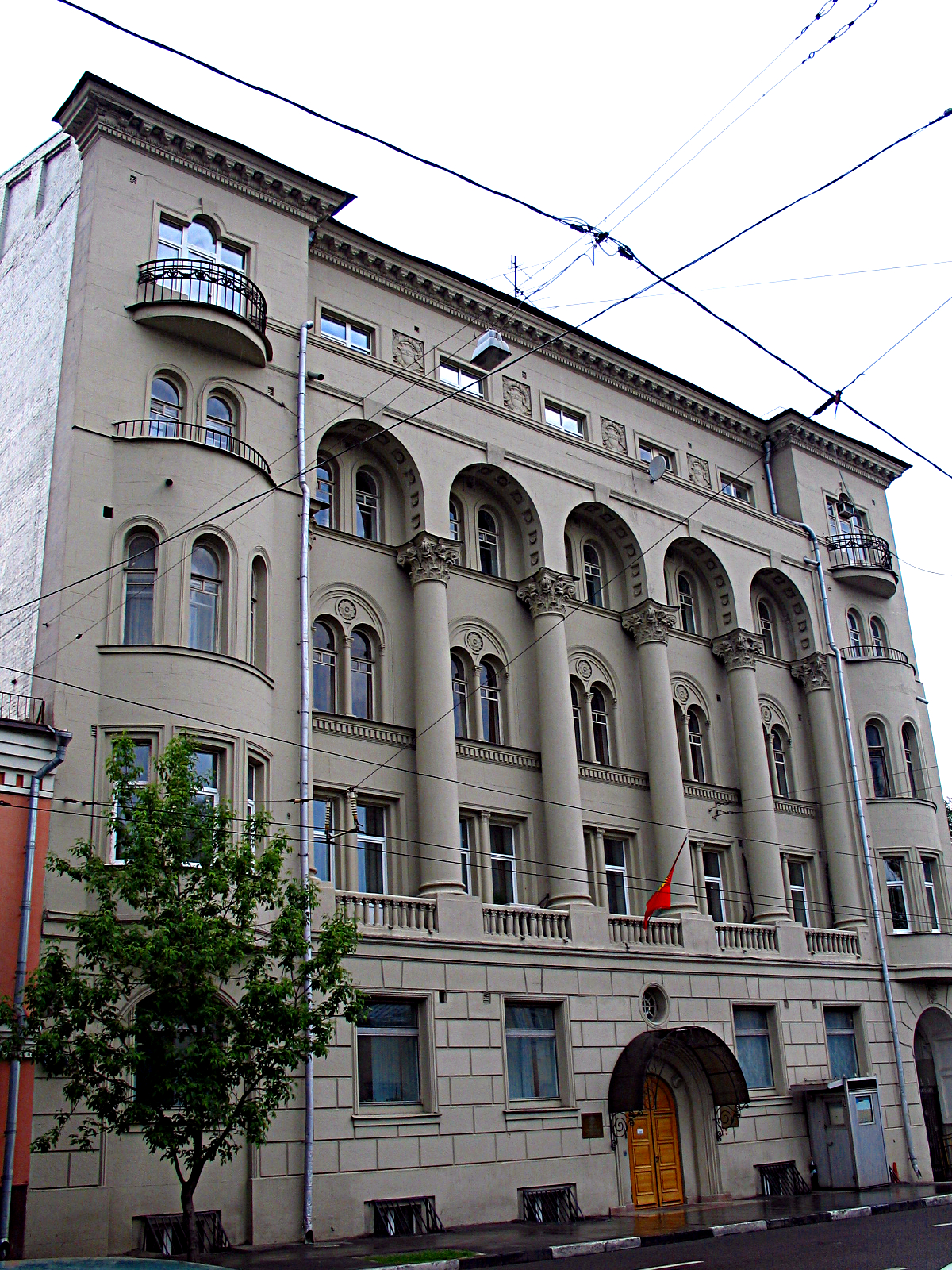
Embassy in Moscow

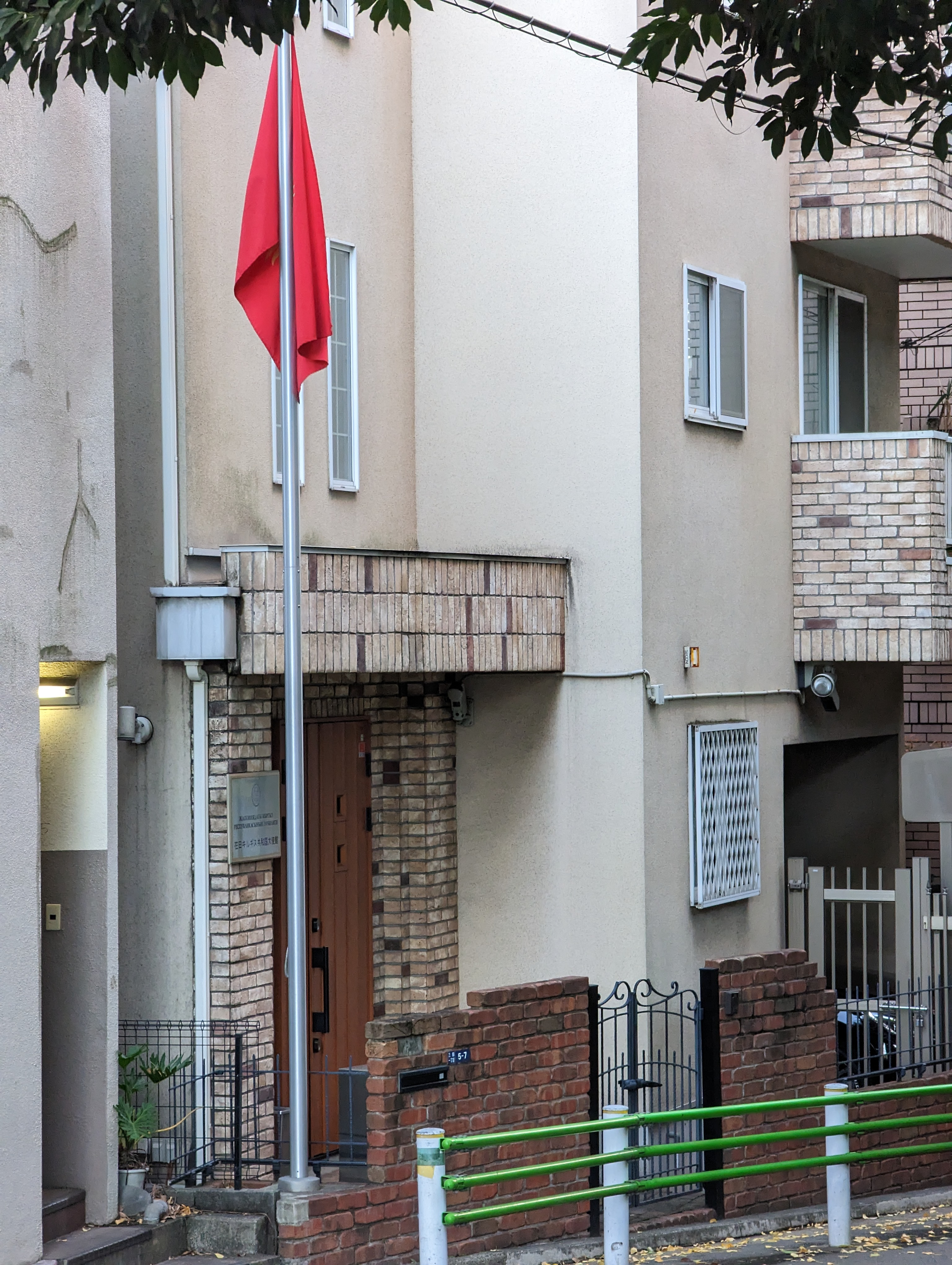
Embassy in Tokyo

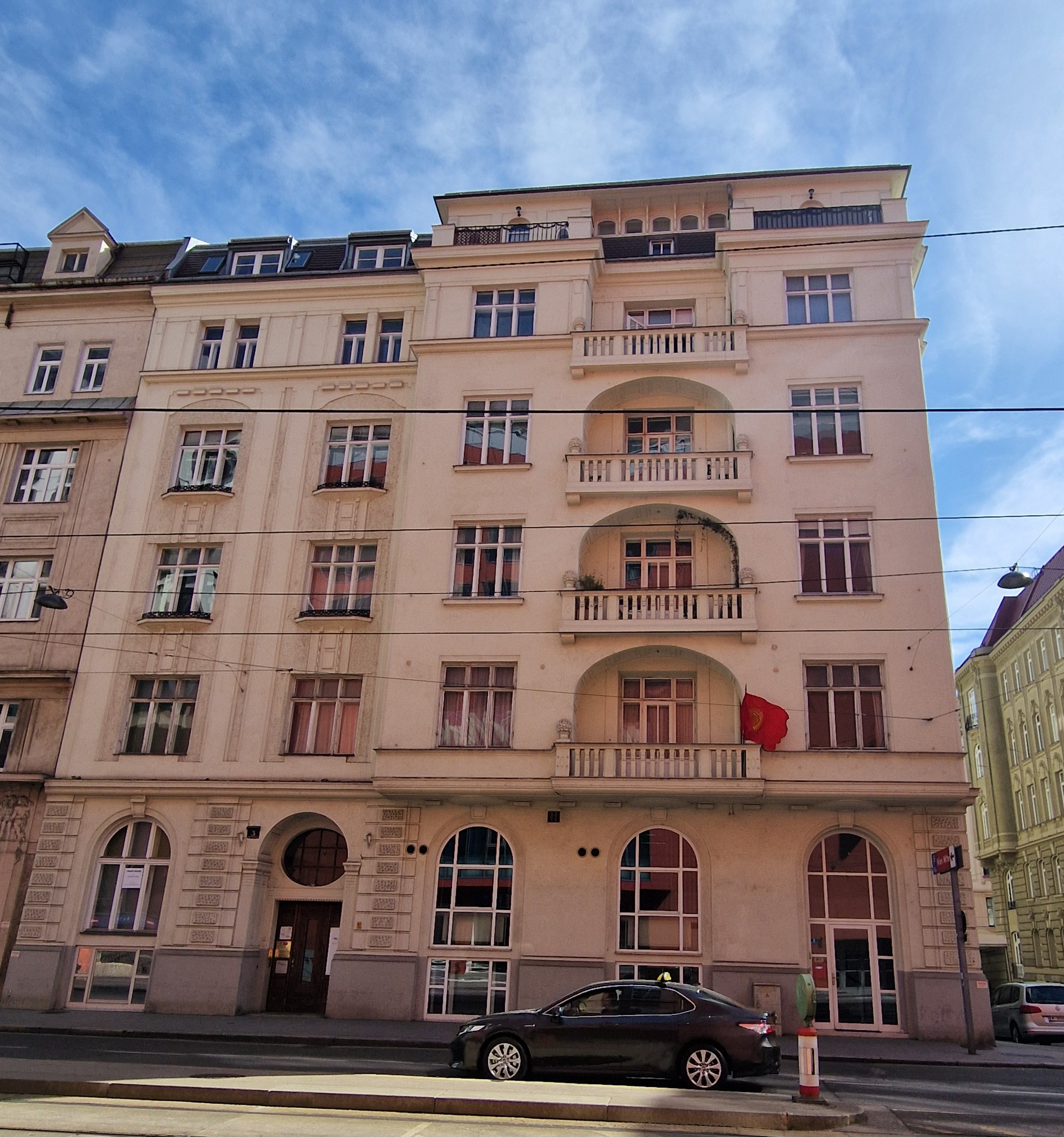
Embassy in Vienna

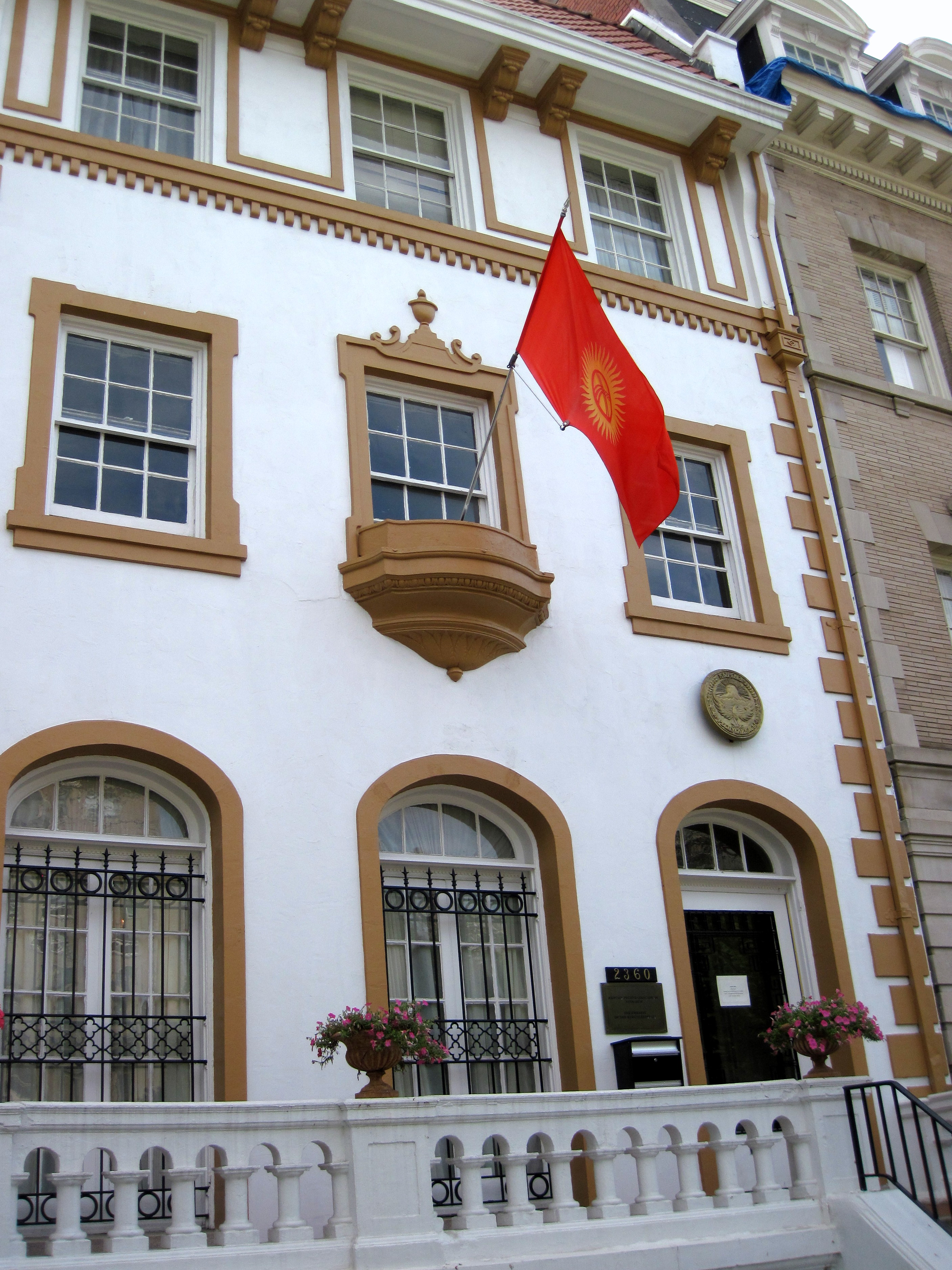
Embassy in Washington, D.C.

== Closed missions ==
=== Europe ===
Host country	Host city	Mission	Year closed	Ref.
Germany	Bonn	Embassy Branch Office	2023	

== See also ==
- Foreign relations of Kyrgyzstan
- Visa policy of Kyrgyzstan
