= Foreign relations of Kyrgyzstan =

Kyrgyzstan has close relations with other members of the Commonwealth of Independent States, particularly Kazakhstan and Russia, given the historical legacy of the Soviet Union. It also has close relations with Turkey as well, given their shared heritage as Turkic languages.

While Kyrgyzstan was initially determined to stay in the ruble zone, the stringent conditions set forth by the Russian Government prompted Kyrgyzstan to introduce its own currency, the som, in May 1993. Kyrgyzstan's withdrawal from the ruble zone was done with little prior notification and initially caused tensions in the region. Both Kazakhstan and Uzbekistan temporarily suspended trade, and Uzbekistan even introduced restrictions tantamount to economic sanctions. Both nations feared an influx of rubles and an increase in inflation. Uzbekistan and Kazakhstan's hostility toward Kyrgyzstan was short-lived, and the three nations signed an agreement in January 1994 creating an economic union. This led to the relaxation of border restrictions between the nations the following month. Kyrgyzstan also has contributed to the CIS peacekeeping forces in Tajikistan.

Turkey has sought to capitalize on its cultural and ethnic links to the region and has found Kyrgyzstan receptive to cultivating bilateral relations. The Kyrgyz Republic also has experienced a dramatic increase in trade with the People's Republic of China, its southern neighbor. Kyrgyzstan has been active in furthering regional cooperation, such as joint military exercises with Uzbek and Kazakh troops.

In January 1999, a new OSCE office opened in Bishkek; on February 18, 2000, the OSCE announced that an additional office would open in Osh to assist Bishkek in carrying out its work. Kyrgyzstan is a member of the OSCE, the CIS, and the United Nations.

== Diplomatic relations ==
List of countries which Kyrgyzstan maintains diplomatic relations with:

#	Country	Date
1	Australia	26 December 1991
2	United States	27 December 1991
3	Albania	4 January 1992
4	China	5 January 1992
5	Egypt	9 January 1992
6	North Korea	21 January 1992
7	Japan	26 January 1992
8	South Africa	26 January 1992
9	Turkey	29 January 1992
10	South Korea	31 January 1992
11	Germany	3 February 1992
12	Poland	10 February 1992
13	Switzerland	14 February 1992
14	Canada	17 February 1992
15	Cyprus	20 February 1992
16	France	28 February 1992
17	Bangladesh	3 March 1992
18	Israel	4 March 1992
19	India	18 March 1992
20	Cuba	20 March 1992
21	Russia	20 March 1992
22	Finland	23 March 1992
23	Italy	24 March 1992
24	Austria	25 March 1992
25	Belgium	25 March 1992
26	Sweden	25 March 1992
27	Madagascar	26 March 1992
28	Mexico	27 March 1992
29	Malaysia	2 April 1992
30	Spain	3 April 1992
31	Hungary	16 April 1992
32	Mongolia	22 April 1992
33	Philippines	24 April 1992
34	Denmark	8 May 1992
35	Iran	10 May 1992
36	Pakistan	10 May 1992
37	Oman	18 May 1992
38	Bulgaria	20 May 1992
39	Luxembourg	26 May 1992
40	Vietnam	4 June 1992
41	Netherlands	10 June 1992
42	Greece	12 June 1992
43	United Kingdom	12 June 1992
44	Romania	15 June 1992
45	Morocco	25 June 1992
46	Ghana	26 June 1992
47	Norway	26 June 1992
48	Lithuania	3 July 1992
49	Georgia	10 July 1992
50	Thailand	6 August 1992
51	Portugal	18 August 1992
—	Holy See	27 August 1992
52	Singapore	27 August 1992
53	New Zealand	7 September 1992
54	Ukraine	19 September 1992
55	Argentina	6 October 1992
56	Turkmenistan	9 October 1992
57	Kazakhstan	15 October 1992
58	Saudi Arabia	19 October 1992
59	Moldova	30 October 1992
60	Mali	5 November 1992
61	Tunisia	25 November 1992
62	Czech Republic	1 January 1993
63	Slovakia	1 January 1993
64	Armenia	9 January 1993
65	Chad	11 January 1993
66	Tajikistan	14 January 1993
67	Azerbaijan	19 January 1993
68	Belarus	21 January 1993
69	Guatemala	10 February 1993
70	Jordan	10 February 1993
71	Uzbekistan	16 February 1993
72	Malta	19 February 1993
73	Libya	25 February 1993
74	Latvia	18 March 1993
75	Nepal	26 March 1993
76	Indonesia	5 April 1993
77	Bosnia and Herzegovina	23 April 1993
78	Syria	28 May 1993
79	Brazil	6 August 1993
80	Uruguay	13 August 1993
81	Maldives	31 August 1993
82	Zambia	17 September 1993
83	Colombia	6 October 1993
84	Slovenia	19 January 1994
85	North Macedonia	6 June 1994
86	Kuwait	17 December 1994
87	Samoa	14 February 1995
88	Cambodia	20 March 1995
89	Laos	13 June 1995
—	State of Palestine	12 September 1995
90	Sri Lanka	29 January 1996
91	Bahrain	9 February 1996
92	Brunei	15 March 1996
93	Estonia	12 April 1996
94	United Arab Emirates	1 August 1996
95	Algeria	21 December 1996
96	Croatia	23 December 1996
97	Yemen	20 May 1997
98	Qatar	3 March 1998
99	Serbia	25 June 1998
100	Peru	2 July 1999
101	Chile	9 August 1999
102	Liechtenstein	16 September 1999
103	Afghanistan	12 November 1999
104	Jamaica	25 February 2000
105	Ireland	23 June 2000
106	Gambia	30 June 2000
107	Myanmar	9 November 2000
108	Namibia	29 November 2000
109	Kenya	12 December 2000
110	Iceland	2 April 2001
111	Costa Rica	24 September 2001
112	San Marino	20 September 2004
113	Benin	29 January 2009
114	Montenegro	24 June 2009
115	Senegal	2 April 2010
116	Dominican Republic	30 June 2011
117	Tuvalu	14 September 2011
118	Paraguay	23 May 2012
119	Fiji	14 February 2014
120	Eritrea	27 February 2014
121	Seychelles	5 March 2014
122	Uganda	19 March 2014
123	Andorra	25 September 2014
124	Solomon Islands	22 December 2014
125	Djibouti	3 June 2015
126	Guinea	8 September 2015
127	Ivory Coast	25 September 2015
128	Sudan	26 September 2015
129	Mauritania	30 September 2015
130	Togo	30 September 2015
131	Iraq	5 November 2015
132	Republic of the Congo	3 February 2016
133	El Salvador	17 March 2016
134	Mauritius	16 June 2016
135	Liberia	17 June 2016
136	Ethiopia	23 July 2016
137	Guyana	23 September 2016
138	Suriname	23 September 2016
139	Dominica	17 October 2016
140	Sierra Leone	1 November 2016
141	Central African Republic	21 November 2016
142	Ecuador	13 December 2016
143	Marshall Islands	22 December 2016
144	Monaco	9 March 2017
145	Lebanon	29 June 2017
146	Nicaragua	7 July 2017
147	Lesotho	20 July 2017
148	Burundi	22 September 2017
149	Zimbabwe	7 December 2017
150	Equatorial Guinea	7 June 2018
151	Saint Kitts and Nevis	8 June 2018
152	Venezuela	27 September 2018
153	Federated States of Micronesia	30 October 2018
154	Bolivia	29 May 2019
155	Grenada	3 June 2019
156	Cape Verde	26 September 2019
157	Kiribati	26 September 2019
158	Saint Vincent and the Grenadines	26 September 2019
159	Vanuatu	26 September 2019
160	Cameroon	27 September 2019
161	Mozambique	27 September 2019
162	Nauru	31 January 2020
163	Antigua and Barbuda	3 June 2021
164	Panama	24 September 2021
165	Palau	7 October 2021
166	Malawi	22 September 2022
167	Tonga	7 December 2022
168	Rwanda	13 December 2022
169	Saint Lucia	20 September 2023
170	Angola	26 September 2024
171	Guinea-Bissau	6 February 2025
172	Botswana	5 March 2025
173	Burkina Faso	7 April 2025
174	Belize	8 April 2025
175	Somalia	8 April 2025
176	Honduras	8 April 2025
177	Eswatini	24 July 2025
178	Gabon	23 September 2025
179	Papua New Guinea	23 September 2025
180	Bahamas	25 September 2025
181	South Sudan	25 September 2025
182	Tanzania	26 September 2025
183	São Tomé and Príncipe	26 September 2025
184	Democratic Republic of the Congo	24 February 2026
185	Trinidad and Tobago	29 April 2026
186	Timor-Leste	25 May 2026
187	Comoros	24 September 2026
188	Haiti	25 September 2026
189	Niger	26 September 2026

== Bilateral relations ==
Country	Formal Relations Began	Notes
Armenia	January 1993	Both countries established diplomatic relations in January 1993 by protocol.; Armenia is represented in Kyrgyzstan through its embassy in Astana, Kazakhstan and an honorary consulate in Bishkek.; Kyrgyzstan is represented in Armenia through its embassy in Moscow, Russia.; Both countries are members of the Commonwealth of Independent States, Collective Security Treaty Organization and Commonwealth of Independent States Free Trade Area.
Australia		Australia is represented in Kyrgyzstan by its embassy in Moscow, Russia.
Austria	25 March 1992	Austria is represented in Kyrgyzstan by its embassy in Astana, Kazakhstan.; Kyrgyzstan has an embassy in Vienna.
Azerbaijan		See Azerbaijan–Kyrgyzstan relations: Azerbaijan has an embassy in Bishkek.; Kyrgyzstan has an embassy in Baku.
China		See China–Kyrgyzstan relations As of 1996, relations between both nations were an area of substantial uncertainty for the government in Bishkek. The free-trade zone in Naryn attracted large numbers of Chinese businesspeople, who came to dominate most of the republic's import and export of small goods. Most of these trades are in barter conducted by ethnic Kyrgyz or Kazakhs who are Chinese citizens. The Kyrgyzstani government has expressed alarm over the numbers of Chinese who are moving into Naryn and other parts of Kyrgyzstan, but no preventive measures had been taken as of 1996.
Georgia		Georgia is represented in Kyrgyzstan by its embassy in Astana, Kazakhstan.; Kyrgyzstan is represented in Georgia by its embassy in Baku, Azerbaijan.; Both countries are full members of the Organization for Security and Co-operation in Europe.
Greece	1992	See Greece-Kyrgyzstan relations: Both countries established diplomatic relations in 1992. Greece is represented in Kyrgyzstan through its embassy in Almaty (Kazakhstan). Kyrgyzstan is represented in Greece through a non resident ambassador based in Bishkek (in the Foreign Ministry). Kyrgyz consular representation in Greece is made by the Kazakh consulate in Athens.; On November 1, 2004, Kyrgyz President Askar Akayev made an official visit to Greece. A Foreign Ministry delegation from Greece visited Dushanbe for talks, and had meetings with Tajikistans Foreign Minister Zarifi and First Deputy Foreign Minister Youldashev in 2008. Foreign Minister Dora Bakoyannis met with Tajikistans Foreign Minister Zarifi during the 1st EU-Central Asia Forum on security issues in Paris in September 2008.; There are between 650 and 700 people of Greek descent living in Kyrgyzstan. However, the data of the General Secretariat For Greeks Abroad give an even lower number (50 people).; In 2004 Greece and Kyrgyzstan signed a bilateral agreement for air transports, tourism and diplomacy during Kyrgyz president Askar Akayev's visit to Greece.
India	18 March 1992	See Kyrgyzstan–India relations Since the independence of Kyrgyz Republic on 31 August 1991, India was among the first to establish bilateral diplomatic relations on 18 March 1992; the resident Mission of India was set up in 1994. Political ties with the Kyrgyz Republic have been traditionally warm and friendly. The Kyrgyz leaderships have been largely supportive of India's stand on Kashmir and have welcomed the ongoing peace process. Kyrgyzstan also supports India's bid for permanent seat at the United Nations Security Council and India's role in the Shanghai Cooperation Organization (SCO). India also has strong educational ties with the country. The Defense Minister Omuraliyev was enthusiastic about the prospects of military cooperation in a radio interview with Free Europe in September 2013. "Many are skeptical, thinking that Kyrgyzstan and India can't have mutual interests in military relations.... But we have had a very close partnership in the defense sphere." He specified foreign language (presumably English) training, military medicine and preparing for United Nations peacekeeping missions as specific areas of cooperation.
Iran		See Iran–Kyrgyzstan relations Iran–Kyrgyzstan relations are foreign and diplomatic relations between Kyrgyzstan and Iran. Bilateral relations between Iran and Kyrgyzstan are more or less even and somewhat relaxed. On September 12, 2013, Iran's President Hassan Rouhani expressed political will to enhance relations with Kyrgyzstan and Kazakhstan.
Japan	26 January 1992	Diplomatic relations between Japan and Kyrgyzstan were established on 26 January 1992. Japan opened an embassy in Bishkek in January 2003, and Kyrgyzstan opened an embassy in Tokyo in April 2004.
Kazakhstan		See Kazakhstan–Kyrgyzstan relations Bilateral relationships between the countries are very strong and Kyrgyz and Kazakh are very close in terms of language, culture and religion. Kyrgyz-Kazakh relationships have always been friendly and economic and other formal unifications of two countries have been greeted with strong appreciation since the two nations have a lot in common. On Apr. 26, 2007 Kazakhstan and Kyrgyzstan signed an agreement to create an "International Supreme Council". This historic event took place during an official visit of the Kazakh president to the Kyrgyzstan capital, Bishkek.
Malaysia		See Kyrgyzstan–Malaysia relations Kyrgyzstan has an embassy in Kuala Lumpur, while Malaysia embassy in Tashkent is also accredited to Kyrgyzstan.
Malta	19 February 1993	Both countries established diplomatic relations on 19 February 1993.; Both countries are full members of the Organization for Security and Co-operation in Europe.
Mexico	14 January 1992	Kyrgyzstan is accredited to Mexico from its embassy in Washington, D.C., United States.; Mexico is accredited to Kyrgyzstan from its embassy in Tehran, Iran.
Pakistan	20 December 1991	See Kyrgyzstan–Pakistan relations Relations between the two countries were established on 20 December 1991 shortly after Kyrgyzstan became independent from the Soviet Union.
Russia		See Kyrgyzstan–Russia relations President Almazbek Atambayev and Russian PM Dmitry Medvedev during the Moscow Victory Day Parade, 9 May 2015 Whereas the other Central Asian republics have sometimes complained of Russian interference, Kyrgyzstan has more often wished for more attention and support from Moscow than it has been able to obtain. For all the financial support that the world community has offered, Kyrgyzstan remains economically dependent on Russia, both directly and through Kazakhstan. In early 1995, Askar Akayev, the then President of Kyrgyzstan, attempted to sell Russian companies controlling shares in the republic's twenty-nine largest industrial plants, an offer that Russia refused.
Serbia	1998	Both countries have established diplomatic relations in 1998.; In 2011, the total trade value amounted EUR 3,5 million.
South Korea	31 January 1992	The Republic of Korea and Kyrgyzstan have had official relations since 31 January 1992. On the sidelines of the 69th session of the UN General Assembly, Foreign Minister Yun Byung-se met with his Kyrgyz counterpart Yerlan Abdyldaev on September 26. In the meeting, the two diplomats discussed matters of mutual concern including ways to boost high-level exchanges to step up substantive cooperation and work together on the international stage. The two sides shared the view that their countries have seen their bilateral relations move forward in diverse fields since the visit of Kyrgyz President Almazbek Atambayev to the Republic of Korea in November 2013. The meeting resulted in an agreement to increase high-level exchanges in order to further enhance friendship and cooperation between the two countries.
Tajikistan		See Kyrgyzstan–Tajikistan relations Kyrgyzstan-Tajikistan relations have been tense. Refugees and antigovernment fighters in Tajikistan have crossed into Kyrgyzstan several times, even taking hostages. Kyrgyzstan attempted to assist in brokering an agreement between contesting Tajikistani forces in October 1992 but without success. Askar Akayev later joined presidents Islam Karimov and Nursultan Nazarbayev in sending a joint intervention force to support Tajikistan's president Imomali Rahmonov against insurgents, but the Kyrgyzstani parliament delayed the mission of its small contingent for several months until late spring 1993. In mid-1995 Kyrgyzstani forces had the responsibility of sealing a small portion of the Tajikistan border near Panj from Tajikistani rebel forces.
Turkey	Jan. 29, 1992	See Kyrgyzstan–Turkey relations: Kyrgyzstan has an embassy in Ankara.; Turkey has an embassy in Bishkek.; Both countries are members of Asia Cooperation Dialogue, Economic Cooperation Organization, International Organization of Turkic Culture, OIC, TAKM, Turkic Council, TURKPA, OSCE and WTO.; Trade volume between the two countries was US$519 million in 2019 (Kyrgyz exports/imports: 77/442 million USD.; Turkey became the first state to recognize the Republic of Kyrgyzstan.
Turkmenistan		See Kyrgyzstan–Turkmenistan relations: Kyrgyzstan has an embassy in Ashgabat.; Turkmenistan has an embassy in Bishkek.
United Kingdom	12 June 1992	See Kyrgyzstan–United Kingdom relations Foreign Secretary David Cameron with Foreign Minister Jeenbek Kulubayev in Bishkek, April 2024. Kyrgyzstan established diplomatic relations with the United Kingdom on 12 June 1992.: Kyrgyzstan maintains an embassy in London.; The UK is accredited to Kyrgyzstan through its embassy in Bishkek.; Both countries share common membership of the OSCE, and the World Trade Organization. Bilaterally the two countries have a Development Partnership.
United States		See Kyrgyzstan–United States relations The U.S. government provides humanitarian assistance, non-lethal military assistance, and assistance to support economic and political reforms. It also has supported the Kyrgyz Republic's requests for assistance from international organizations. The United States assisted the Kyrgyz Republic accede to the World Trade Organization (WTO) in December 1998. U.S. assistance aids the Kyrgyz Republic in implementing necessary economic, health sector, and educational reforms, and supports economic development and conflict resolution in the Fergana Valley. (See also American Chamber of Commerce in Kyrgyzstan.): Kyrgyzstan has an embassy in Washington, D.C.; United States has an embassy in Bishkek.
Uzbekistan		See Kyrgyzstan–Uzbekistan relations Uzbekistan informs southern Kyrgyzstan both economically and politically, based on the large Uzbek population in that region of Kyrgyzstan and on economic and geographic conditions. Much of Kyrgyzstan depends on Uzbekistan for natural gas; on several occasions, Karimov has achieved political ends by shutting pipelines or by adjusting terms of delivery. In a number of television appearances broadcast in the Osh and Jalal-Abad provinces of Kyrgyzstan, Karimov has addressed Akayev with considerable condescension; Akayev, in turn, has been highly deferential to his neighbor. Although Uzbekistan has not shown overt expansionist tendencies, the Kyrgyz government is acutely aware of the implications of Karimov's assertions that he is responsible for the well-being of all Uzbeks, regardless of their nation of residence.

== Illegal drug trade ==
Kyrgyzstan is a limited illicit cultivator of cannabis and opium poppy, mostly for CIS consumption. There is a limited government eradication program. Kyrgyzstan is used increasingly as a transshipment point for illicit drugs to Russia and Western Europe from Southwest Asia. In 2020, with the assistance of the UN Office on Drugs and Crime (UNODC) Program Office in Kyrgyzstan, the Analytical Center of the Counter Narcotic Service of the Ministry of Interior of the Kyrgyz Republic was established to combat drug trafficking.

== See also ==
- List of diplomatic missions in Kyrgyzstan
- List of diplomatic missions of Kyrgyzstan
