= List of ambassadors of Kyrgyzstan to the United States =

Coordinates: 38°54′47″N 77°3′8.7″W

Ambassador of Kyrgyzstan to the United States Embassy of Kyrgyzstan in Washington, D.C.
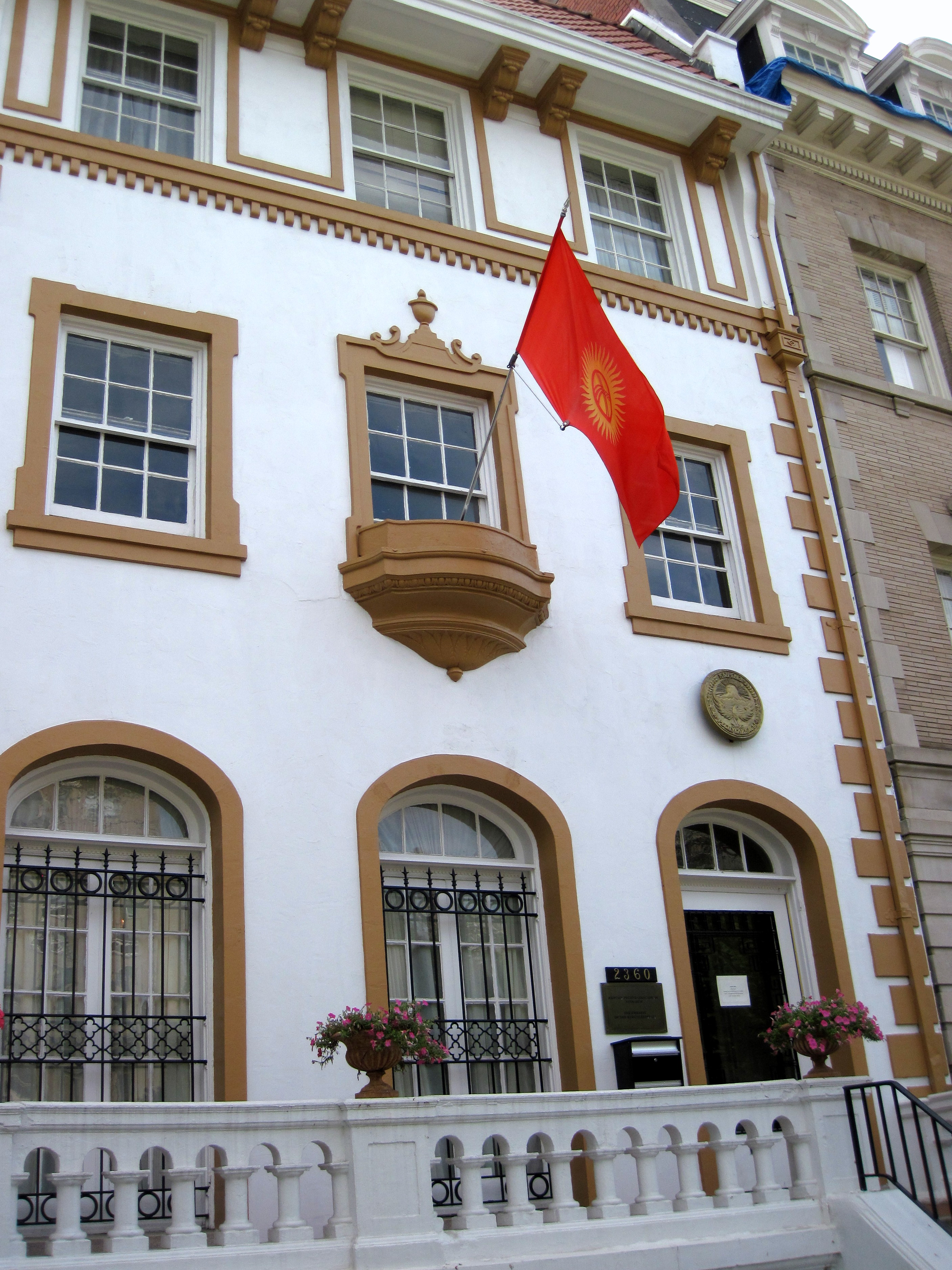
- Incumbent; Bakyt Amanbaev since March 2021
- Inaugural holder: [[]]
- Formation

The Kyrgyz ambassador in Washington, D. C. is the official representative of the Government in Bishkek to the Government of the United States.

== List of representatives ==
Diplomatic agrément	Diplomatic accreditation	Ambassador	Notes	Prime Minister of Kyrgyzstan	President of the United States	Term end
November 1, 1991	Diplomatic relations established between Kyrgyzstan and the United States			Nasirdin Isanov	George H. W. Bush	
July 6, 1992	November 18, 1992	Roza Otunbayeva		Tursunbek Chyngyshev	George H. W. Bush	
February 1997		Baktybek Abdrisaev		Apas Jumagulov	Bill Clinton; George W. Bush	May 2005
June 14, 2005	July 11, 2005	Zamira Sydykova	born 1960	Kurmanbek Bakiyev	George W. Bush; Barack Obama	
December 3, 2010	December 7, 2010	Muktar Djumaliev	born June 22, 1972	Almazbek Atambayev	Barack Obama	
February 13, 2015	February 23, 2015	Kadyr M. Toktogulov	born April 28, 1980 in Osh	Djoomart Otorbaev	Barack Obama	
March 2021		Bakyt Amanbaev	born May 11, 1969		Joe Biden	

== See also ==
Embassy of the Kyrgyz Republic to the USA and Canada
