= Kyrgyzstani passport =

Passport issued to Kyrgyz nationals

Kyrgyz passport
- A biometric Kyrgyz passport
- Type: Passport
- Issued by: Kyrgyzstan
- Purpose: Identification
- Eligibility: Kyrgyz citizenship

The Kyrgyz passport is issued to citizens of Kyrgyzstan for international travel.

== History ==
Following the dissolution of the Soviet Union in December 1991 and the establishment of the Republic of Kyrgyzstan as the successor of the Kirghiz Soviet Socialist Republic, there was a need for a national passport. At the beginning, Kyrgyz citizens continued to use the Soviet passports which were validated with a stamp. In 1994 the Kyrgyz government began issuing a new passport. To be able to submit the form for a passport, one had to collect various document from different government agencies including the military commissariat (for men). After receiving the passport, one had to visit the local government office to register it. Those passports were hand written, which led to frequent forgery attempts. Since 2012 the passports of the 1994 version are not valid anymore for travelling abroad.

== Appearance ==
The passport of a citizen of the Kyrgyz Republic contains 32 pages, not including the cover. The inside pages of the passport have a light blue background. The inscriptions in the passport are in blue and black. The passport cover is light blue and is made of abrasion-resistant material. On the outside of the front cover there are gold-coloured printed inscriptions in the state, official and English languages:"КЫРГЫЗ РЕСПУБЛИКАСЫ КЫРГЫЗСКАЯ РЕСПУБЛИКА THE KYRGYZ REPUBLIC" . In the centre is an embossed image of the State Coat of Arms of the Kyrgyz Republic. Below the State Emblem is an embossed inscription in the state, official and English languages: "ПАСПОРТ ПАСПОРТ PASSPORT".

=== Identity page ===
The identity page of the Kyrgyzstani passport includes the following data:

- Photograph of the holder (4x6 cm; Distance from the bottom of chin to the eye line: 18mm; Distance from the top of the photo to the top of the hair: 5mm)
- Type
- Country code
- Passport number
- Name of the holder
- First names of the holder
- Place of birth of the holder
- Date of birth of the holder
- Sex of the holder
- Profession of the holder
- Place of issue of passport
- Date of issue of passport
- Date of expiry of the passport

== Visa requirements ==
Countries and territories with visa-free entries or visas on arrival for holders of regular Kyrgyzstani passports

In 2016, Kyrgyz citizens had visa-free or visa on arrival access to 58 countries and territories, ranking the Kyrgyzstani passport 79th in the world according to the Visa Restrictions Index.

== See also ==
- Visa policy of Kyrgyzstan
- Visa requirements for Kyrgyzstani citizens
