= Kyrgyzstan–United Kingdom relations =

- Kyrgyzstan: United Kingdom

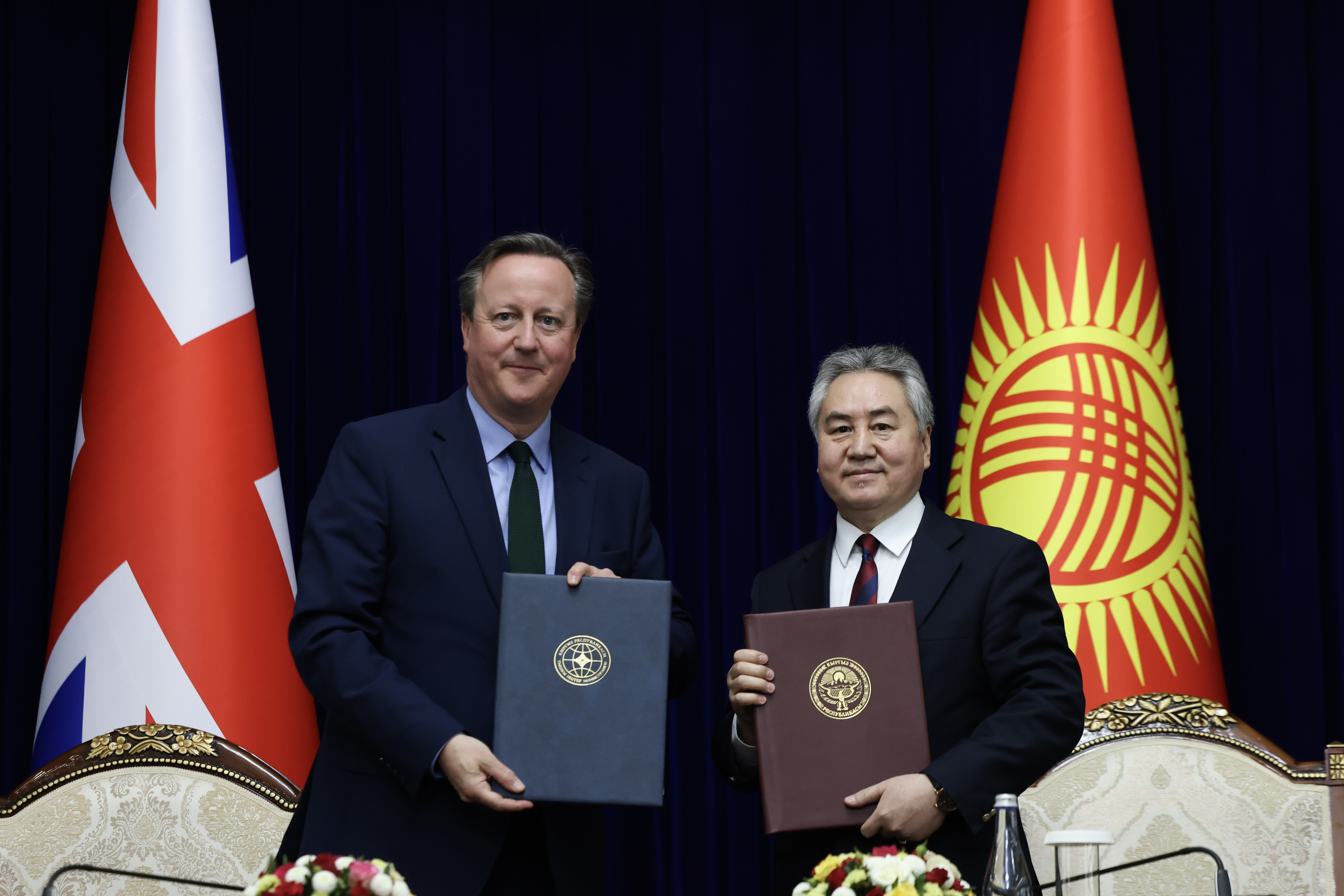
Foreign Secretary David Cameron with Foreign Minister Jeenbek Kulubayev in Bishkek, April 2024.

The United Kingdom recognised Kyrgyzstan on 20 January 1992 (following the dissolution of the Soviet Union) and diplomatic relations were established on 12 June 1992. The first Kyrgyz ambassador to the UK arrived in September 1997. The Kyrgyz embassy is located in the Ascot House in Marylebone, London.

Both countries share common membership of the OSCE, the United Nations and the World Trade Organization. Bilaterally the two countries have a Development Partnership.

== Diplomatic relations ==
From 1992 to 2012 the British Ambassador to Kazakhstan was also accredited to Kyrgyzstan. The ambassador would usually visit Kyrgyzstan once every six weeks due to proximity but it was determined that the arrangement was inadequate, with the Kyrgyz government expressing a desire for their own independent ambassador from the United Kingdom. In 2010, it was revealed that whilst at a formal diplomatic lunch in Kyrgyzstan, the United Kingdom's Prime Ministerial Trade Envoy, Prince Andrew had made disparaging comments about a Serious Fraud Office investigation to American diplomats. This led to him stepping down as a Trade Envoy. In 2011, the Foreign Secretary, William Hague announced that the United Kingdom would be opening its first embassy in Kyrgyzstan as part of a British government policy change to station more diplomatic staff in Asia, funded by cutting operations outside of capital cities within European countries.

The British Embassy in Bishkek became operational in December 2011 and the new Ambassador to Kyrgyzstan took up her post formally in March 2012 when she presented her credentials to the President.

In 2024, British Foreign Secretary, David Cameron visited Kyrgyzstan for the first time a British government minister had visited Kyrgyzstan. This came after British exports to Kyrgyzstan increased more than 1,100% in 2024 due to the Russo-Ukraine War.

== See also ==
- Foreign relations of Kyrgyzstan
- Foreign relations of the United Kingdom
- List of Ambassadors of the United Kingdom to Kyrgyzstan
