= Kyrgyzstan–Malaysia relations =

- Kyrgyzstan: Malaysia

Kyrgyzstan–Malaysia relations refers to foreign relations between Kyrgyzstan and Malaysia. Kyrgyzstan has an embassy in Kuala Lumpur, while Malaysia embassy in Tashkent, Uzbekistan is also accredited to Kyrgyzstan.

== History ==
Diplomatic relations between the two countries were established in March 1992, with the embassy of Kyrgyzstan established in 1997 with the aid of Malaysian Government. In 1995, the President of Kyrgyzstan Askar Akaev conducted a first official visit to Malaysia. The Malaysian Prime Minister Mahathir Mohamad then made a reciprocal official visit to the Kyrgyzstan in 1996. Since that, the bilateral relations are greatly improved in the sector of trade and economy, investment, cultural, humanitarian and other spheres of mutual interest. Prime Minister Anwar Ibrahim visited Bishkek, from May 15–16, 2024 as he first by a Malaysian Prime Minister to the country. On June 24, 2025, President Sadyr Japarov visited Malaysia.

== Education relations ==
There is also some Kyrgyz live in Malaysia basically due to working or attending education which has led to mixed marriages between Kyrgyz and Malaysian.

== Economic relations ==
Currently, the Republic of Kyrgyzstan wants to enhance closer economic ties with Malaysia. The bilateral trade between the two countries remain small at about U$3 million due to no air direct link between the two capital cities. But, many Malaysian companies have started to look at possibilities in investment in the country.

== Resident diplomatic missions ==
- Kyrgyzstan has an embassy in Kuala Lumpur.
- Malaysia is accredited to Kyrgyzstan from its embassy in Tashkent, Uzbekistan.

== See also ==
- Foreign relations of Kyrgyzstan
- Foreign relations of Malaysia
