= Kyrgyzstan–Turkmenistan relations =

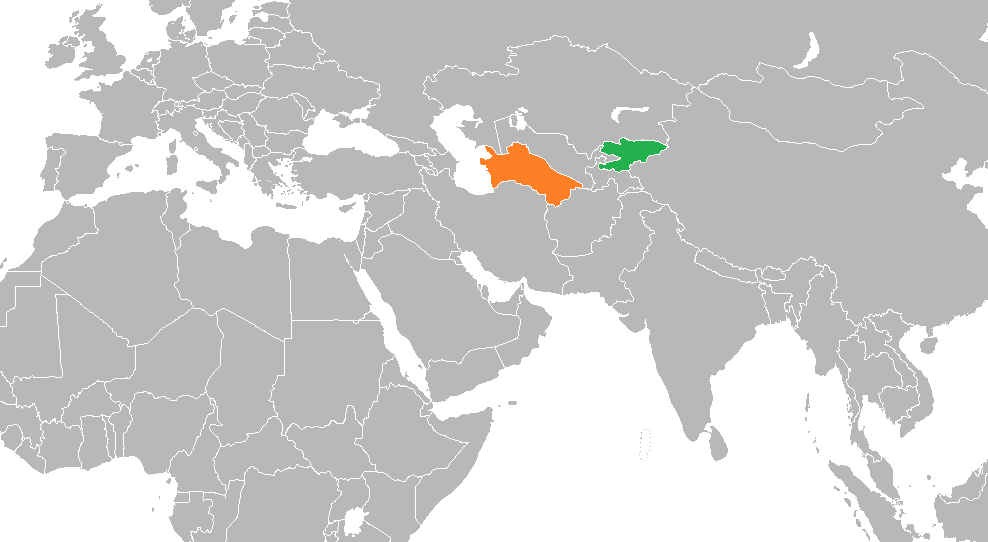

- Kyrgyzstan: Turkmenistan

The two central Asian countries have shared relations for centuries, having previously been part of the former Soviet Union. The relations between the two nations mainly include economic, diplomatic and cultural ties. Both Kyrgyzstan and Turkmenistan are Turkic nations with similar cuisines, languages and cultures. Kyrgyzstan has an embassy in Ashgabat and Turkmenistan has an embassy in Bishkek.

== State visits ==
The presidents of the two countries regularly visit each other regarding to strengthening bilateral connections between Kyrgyzstan and Turkmenistan. One of those visits happened on August 23, 2018. The Kyrgyz President visited Turkmenistan in November 2014 and the Turkmen President visited Bishkek in August 2015.

== Economic relations ==
In 2016, the trade turnover between Kyrgyzstan and Turkmenistan amounted to around $5.2 million which was 23.7% more compared to the statistics of last year. In 2014, the transactions between them also increased 46.3% (0.2% of total foreign trade) and it was a significant growth in comparison of the growth rate of 2013. In recent years, relations between the two countries have become more active both at the level of governments and businesses. Kyrgyzstan imports nuts, vegetable oil, polymers, propylene, fertilizers, raw sheep skins, and vegetables from Turkmenistan. In 2016, Turkmenistan has exported textiles worth $1.4 million to Kyrgyzstan.

Kyrgyzstan's main exported products to Turkmenistan included: electrical appliances, agricultural products and plastic products.

It is estimated that two Kyrgyz-Turkmen bilateral business related activities including 21 projects worth of $30 million according to the statistics of 2016 in Turkmenistan.

In Kyrgyzstan, 30 Kyrgyz-Turkmen JSCs have been registered starting from that year 11 of the total companies began to function.

In 2016, Kyrgyzstan first time exported approximately one thousand tons of beans to Turkmenistan.

Kyrgyzstan's suggestion of opening of Ashgabat—Bishkek—Ürümqi—Guangzhou flight anticipated to increase future economic ties between two nations.

== Transport cooperation ==
Kyrgyzstan has an interest to join the Iran–Oman–Turkmenistan–Uzbekistan international transport corridor and may become member of free trade zone.

== Resident diplomatic missions ==
- Kyrgyzstan has an embassy in Ashgabat.
- Turkmenistan has an embassy in Bishkek.

== See also ==
- Foreign relations of Kyrgyzstan
- Foreign relations of Turkmenistan
