= List of diplomatic missions in Kyrgyzstan =

This is a list of diplomatic missions in Kyrgyzstan. At present, the capital of Bishkek hosts 26 embassies.

Several other countries have ambassadors accredited from other regional capitals, such as Astana, Moscow, and Tashkent.

Honorary consulates and trade missions are omitted from this listing.

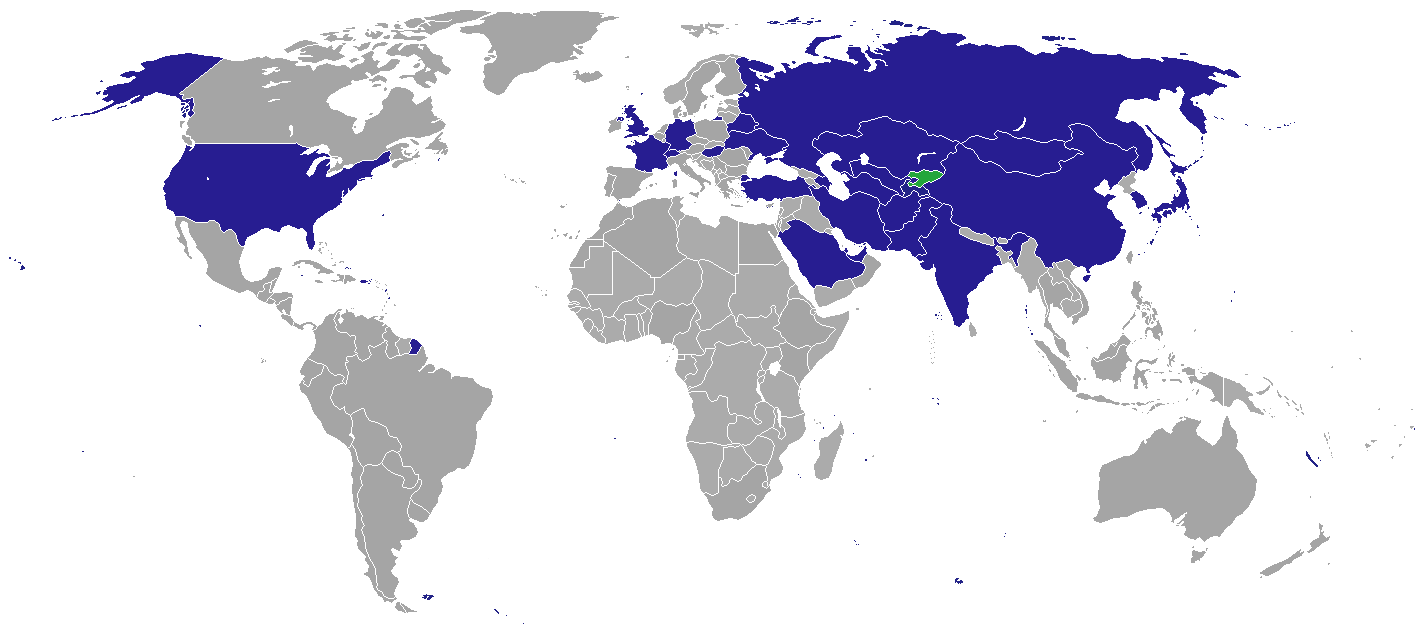
Map of diplomatic missions in Kyrgyzstan

== Diplomatic missions in Bishkek ==
=== Embassies ===
1. Afghanistan
2. Azerbaijan
3. Belarus
4. China
5. France
6. Germany
7. Hungary
8. India
9. Iran
10. Japan
11. Kazakhstan
12. Mongolia
13. Pakistan
14. Qatar
15. Russia
16. Saudi Arabia
17. South Korea
18. Switzerland
19. Tajikistan
20. Turkey
21. Turkmenistan
22. Ukraine
23. United Arab Emirates
24. United Kingdom
25. United States
26. Uzbekistan

=== Other Posts ===
1. European Union (Delegation)
2. Northern Cyprus (Representative Office)

== Consular missions ==
=== Osh ===
1. Kazakhstan (Consulate-General)
2. Russia (Consulate-General)
3. Uzbekistan (Consulate-General)

== Non-resident embassies accredited to Kyrgyzstan ==
=== Resident in Ankara, Turkey ===
1. Albania
2. Cambodia
3. Guatemala
4. Mauritania
5. Somalia

=== Resident in Astana, Kazakhstan ===
1. Armenia
2. Austria
3. Belgium
4. Brazil
5. Bulgaria
6. Canada
7. Croatia
8. Cuba
9. Czechia
10. Egypt
11. Estonia
12. Finland
13. Georgia
14. Greece
15. Holy See
16. Iraq
17. Israel
18. Italy
19. Kuwait
20. Latvia
21. Lebanon
22. Lithuania
23. Morocco
24. Netherlands
25. North Macedonia
26. Oman
27. Poland
28. Portugal
29. Romania
30. Slovakia
31. South Africa
32. Spain
33. Thailand
34. Venezuela
35. Vietnam

=== Resident in Islamabad, Pakistan ===
1. Ethiopia
2. Nepal
3. Sri Lanka
4. Yemen

=== Resident in Moscow, Russia ===
1. Angola
2. Argentina
3. Australia
4. Benin
5. Bosnia and Herzegovina
6. Chile
7. Colombia
8. Congo-Brazzaville
9. Cyprus
10. Denmark
11. Dominican Republic
12. Ecuador
13. Ireland
14. Madagascar
15. Mali
16. Moldova
17. New Zealand
18. Nicaragua
19. North Korea
20. Senegal
21. Serbia
22. Slovenia
23. Syria
24. Tanzania
25. Zambia

=== Resident in Tashkent, Uzbekistan ===
1. Algeria
2. Bangladesh
3. Indonesia
4. Jordan
5. Malaysia
6. Palestine

=== Resident in Tehran, Iran ===
1. Ghana
2. Mexico
3. Philippines
4. Uganda

=== Resident in other cities ===
1. Bahrain (Beijing)
2. Norway (Oslo)
3. Seychelles (Abu Dhabi)
4. Sweden (Stockholm)
5. Uruguay (Beijing)

== Closed missions ==
Host city	Sending country	Mission	Year closed	Ref.
Osh	China	Consulate-General	2019	
