= Kyrgyzstan–Pakistan relations =

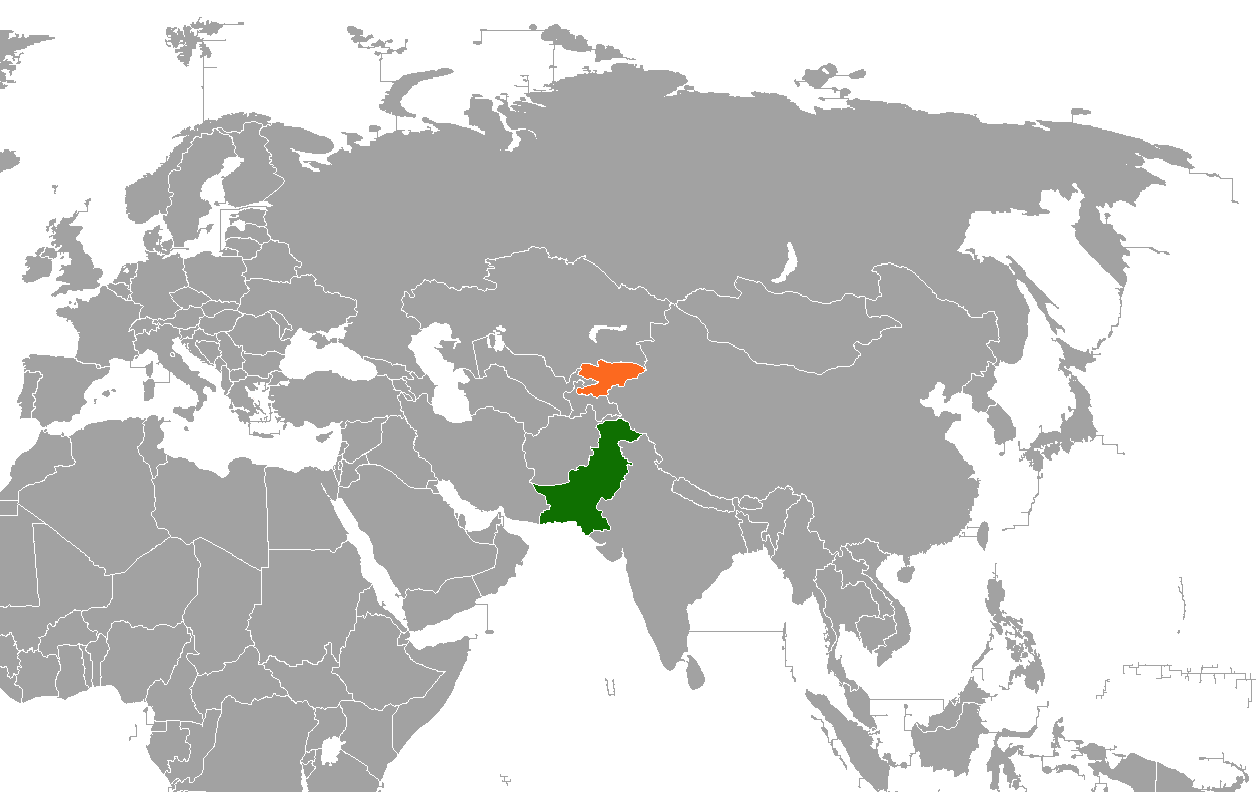

- Pakistan: Kyrgyzstan

Diplomatic mission
- Embassy of Pakistan, Bishkek: Embassy of Kyrgyzstan, Islamabad

Envoy
- Ambassador Altamash Wazir Khan: Ambassador Kylychbek Sultan

Pakistan formally established diplomatic ties with Kyrgyzstan on May 10, 1992, although relations were initially forged on December 20, 1991, shortly after Kyrgyzstan became independent of the Soviet Union. Consequently, Pakistan opened its diplomatic outpost in Bishkek in 1995. Both countries maintain embassies in each other's capitals.

Both nations are members of the same regional polity while being simultaneously affiliated with significant organizations like the United Nations (UN), Shanghai Cooperation Organisation (SCO), Economic Cooperation Organization (ECO), Organization of Islamic Cooperation (OIC) and G-77 among others.

At the same time, they are even signatories of numerous Agreements, MoUs, Treaties & Protocols. These broadly encompass the reciprocal promotion and protection of investment, cooperation in academics, avoidance of double taxation, air services and bilateral political consultations between the respective Ministries of Foreign Affairs.

In 1991, both countries signed an agreement for the promotion and expansion of economic and cultural ties. They share cultural affinity with the Mughal Empire whose founder - Zaheer ud Din Babur - was born in the territory that today forms Kyrgyzstan's Osh region/oblast.

== Apex Grade Interactions ==
The frequency of interactions at the apex grade is elaborated hereunder:

Visits Emanating From The Kyrgyz Republic::

 Kyrgyz President ASKAR AKAYEV = 1994 & 2005  Prime Minister APAS DJUMAGULOV = 1997  Chairman of the Council of Peoples Representatives/Jogorku Kenesh, ALTAI BORUBAEV = 2004  Foreign Minister ERLAN ABDYLDAEV = 26 February 2015.  Foreign Minister ERLAN ABDYLBAEV = 19-20 March 2015.  PM SOORONBAI JEENBEKOV attended the 13th ECO Summit = 1 March 2017.  Speaker of the Jogorku Kenesh, CHYNYBAI TURSUNBEKOV = 13-15 March 2017.  Head of General Staff of Armed Forces MAJOR GENERAL RAIMBERDI DUISHENBIEV = 12-15 March 2018.  Education Minister ALMAZBEK BISHENALIEV = 22 February 2021  Deputy Foreign Minister AIBEK ARTYKBAEV attended the extraordinary session of the Council of Foreign Ministers of the member countries of Organization of Islamic Cooperation = 18-19 December 2021.  Foreign Minister Ruslan Kazakbaev attended the 48th session of the Council of Foreign Ministers of the OIC member states = 22-23 March 2022.

Visits Emanating From Pakistan::

 Prime Minister Benazir Bhutto = August 1995  President Farooq Leghari = 26-28 October 1996  President Pervez Musharraf = 8 March 2005  Prime Minister Yousaf Raza Gillani = 15-17 March 2011  Foreign Minister Hina Rabbani Khar = 18 October 2011.  Prime Minister Nawaz Sharif = 21 May 2015.  Minister of Water and Power, Khwaja Asif, to confer on progress attained by the CASA-1000 project for the export of electricity from Kyrgyzstan = 13 January 2016  Adviser to the Prime Minister on Foreign Affairs, Sartaj Aziz, while representing Pakistan at the 15th SCO Summit = 2-3 November 2016  Federal Minister for Climate Change, Mushahid Ullah Khan to partake at the 2nd International Forum on the International Snow Leopard Conservation = 24-25 August 2017  Foreign Minister Shah Mahmood Qureshi for the SCO Council of Foreign Ministers = 22 May 2019  Prime Minister Imran Khan to attend the 19th SCO Meeting of the Council of Heads of State (CHS) = 13-14 June 2019

== Parliamentary Synergy ==
Parliamentary friendship groups have been established in both sets of parliaments since long. From this perspective, interactions have been frequenting on both ends. Likewise, this is punctuated through the following interfaces:

 Speaker of the Jogorku Kenesh, ASILBEK JEENBEKOV and Speaker National Assembly, Ayaz Sadiq, met on the margins of Parliamentary Assembly of Collective Security Treaty Organization (CSTO) hosted in Saint Petersburg = 26 November 2015  MNA Hamza Shehbaz attended the Snow Leopard Conservation Forum = 22-23 October 2013  MNAs Aftab Ahmad Khan Sherpao, Shazia Marri, Muhammad Afzal Khan and Syed Ghazi Gulab Jamal participated in the 84th Rose-Roth Seminar = 13-15 November 2013  At the helm of a 10-member entourage, Speaker of the JogorkuKenesh, CHYNYBAI TURSUNBEKOV, visited Islamabad = 13-15 March 2017  Chairman Senate Sadiq Sanjrani attended a conference in the virtual format "International Conference on Re-imagining the Silk Road: Pakistan and Kyrgyzstan in the age of Connectivity in Bishkek" = 10-11 December 2020

== Institutional Mechanisms ==
Concluded agreements, MoUs, treaties (AMTs) or instruments exceed 30 and encompass different spheres of activity.

Bilateral Political Consultations (BPC)

The Protocol and MoU on convening the BPC at the senior tiers of the Foreign Ministries of both nations were endorsed in 1994 and 2005 respectively. Consequently, the maiden BPC session was hosted in Bishkek at the grade of Deputy Foreign Minister/Additional Secretary (West Asia/Afghanistan) spanning January 23-24, 2018. The next BPC edition materialized in Islamabad on August 17 & 18, 2022. The prime constituents of the agenda of this official rendezvous included political rapport, apex leadership interactions, parliamentary interface, augmenting economic credentials, revivifying cultural drives, regional security, mutual support at regional and international fora and consular affairs.

Joint Ministerial Commission (JMC)

A Joint Ministerial Commission (JMC) came into inception on December 11, 1994. Its debut session was organized in August 2003 in Islamabad, with the subsequent 2nd chapter hosted in Bishkek in November 2007. The JMC mechanism then remained dormant for approximately a decade till January 11 & 12, 2017, in Islamabad.

The raison d’étre of the JMC instrument is premised on the bilateral economic equation in various themes as defined through agro-food, commerce, communications, defence, education, science & technology, energy and investment.

== Capacity Building Programs ==
Pakistan has made available training facilities to Kyrgyz citizens across quite a few spheres of activity. This gesture has gained traction with novice and mid-career diplomats having thus far benefited from training apparatuses at our Foreign Service Academy (FSA). These programs have been complemented by training options provided to Kyrgyz state functionaries at the Postal Staff College Islamabad, National Institute of Banking and Finance, Pakistan Railways Academy, Revenue Collection, Forestry & Agriculture, and English Language at the National University of Modern Languages (NUML). Pakistan is offering two scholarships to Kyrgyz pupils every year in the discipline of BSc. Engineering. This gesture is being sponsored under the auspices of the Pakistan Technical Assistance Programme (PTAP).
