= Embassy of Kyrgyzstan, Washington, D.C. =

Diplomatic mission of The Kyrgyz Republic to the United States and Canada

Embassy of the Kyrgyz Republic in the U.S. and Canada, Washington, D.C.
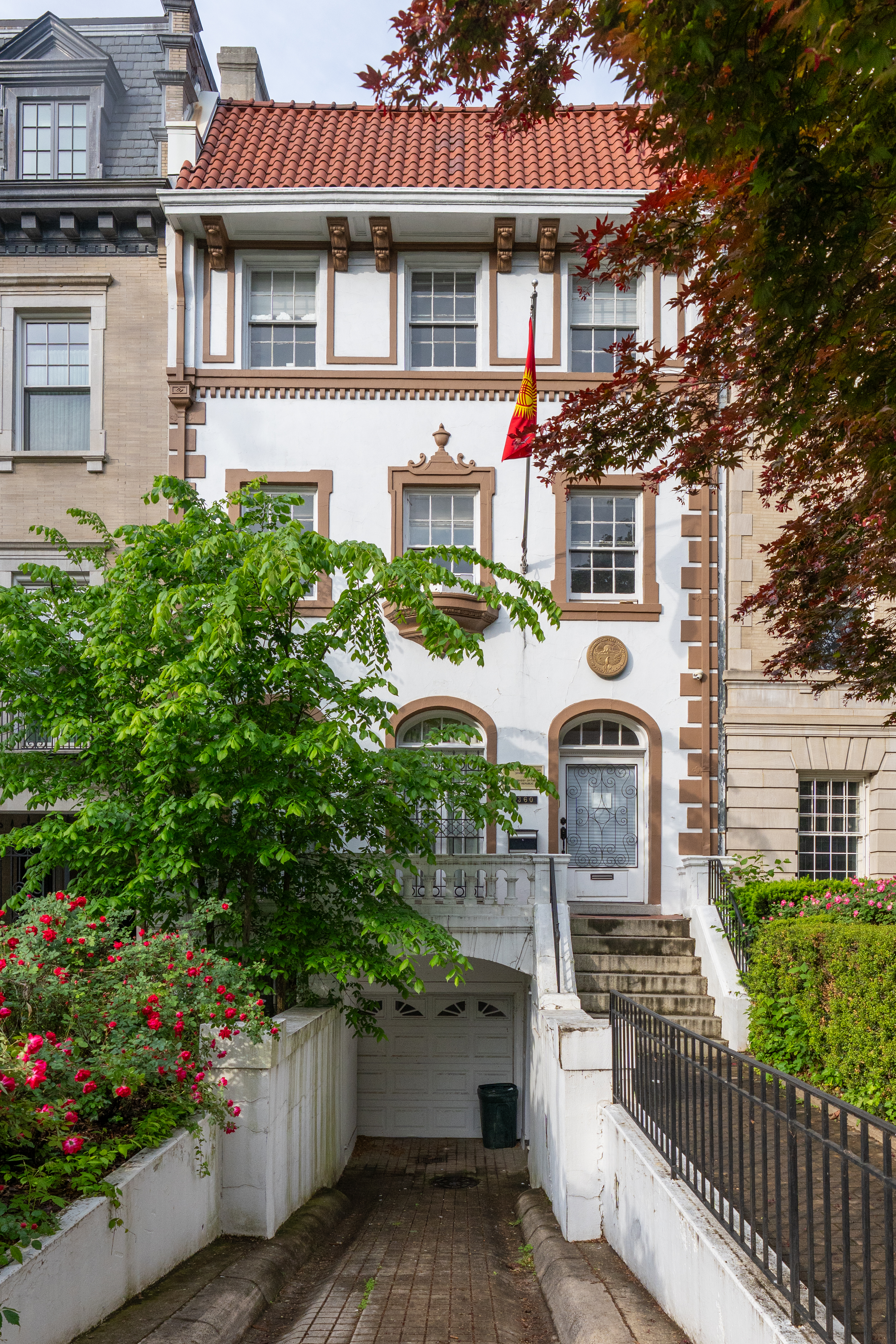
- Location: Washington, D.C., U.S.
- Address: 2360 Massachusetts Avenue, N.W.
- Coordinates: 38°54′47″N 77°3′8.7″W
- Ambassador: Bakyt Amanbaev

The Embassy of Kyrgyzstan in Washington, D.C. is the diplomatic mission of The Kyrgyz Republic to the United States and to Canada. It is located at 2360 Massachusetts Avenue, Northwest, Washington, D.C., in the Embassy Row neighborhood.

The ambassador is Bakyt Amanbaev.
