= Visa policy of Kyrgyzstan =

Policy on permits required to enter Kyrgyzstan

Visitors to Kyrgyzstan must obtain an e-Visa unless they are citizens of one of the visa-exempt countries or citizens who may obtain a visa on arrival.

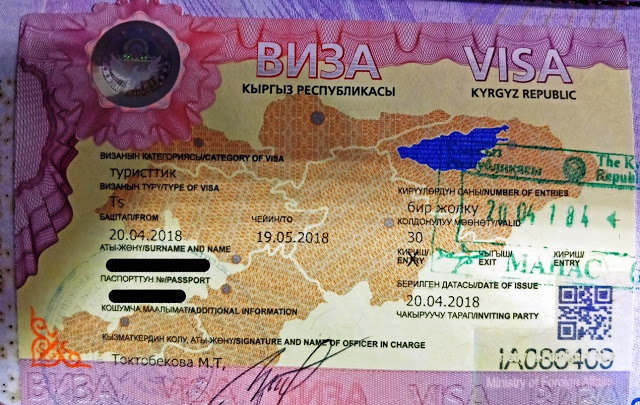
Sample of Kyrgyzstani visa

Kyrgyzstan's visa and other migration policies are also implemented in accordance with the mobility rights arrangements within the Commonwealth of Independent States and the rules of the single market of the Eurasian Economic Union.

== Visa policy map ==
Visa policy of Kyrgyzstan Kyrgyzstan Visa not required - may enter with an ID card (90 days) Visa not required - may enter with an ID card (60 days) Visa not required (180 days) Visa not required (90 days) Visa not required (60 days) Visa not required (30 days) Visa not required (7 days) if holding a voucher or valid Schengen, UK or US multiple-entry visa; otherwise, eVisa Visa on arrival / eVisa Visa on arrival (conditional) / eVisa eVisa

== Visa exemption ==
=== Ordinary passports ===
Holders of ordinary passports of the following countries and territories may enter Kyrgyzstan without a visa for the following period:

180 days within any 360 days

- Bahrain
- Kuwait
- Oman
- Qatar
- Saudi Arabia
- United Arab Emirates

90 days within any 180 days

- Armenia
- Belarus
- Kazakhstan^{ID}
- Mongolia
- Russia^{IP}
- Serbia
- Turkey
- Ukraine

60 days within any 120 days

- Azerbaijan
- Georgia
- Moldova
- Tajikistan
- Uzbekistan^{ID}

30 days within any 60 days

- All European Union member states

- Albania
- Andorra
- Argentina
- Australia
- Bosnia and Herzegovina
- Brazil
- Brunei
- Canada
- Chile
- Iceland
- Israel
- Japan
- Liechtenstein
- North Macedonia
- Mexico
- Monaco
- Montenegro
- New Zealand
- Norway
- San Marino
- Singapore
- South Korea
- Switzerland
- Thailand
- United Kingdom^{1}
- United States
- Vatican City
- Vietnam

30 days

- Hong Kong^{2}
- Macau^{2}
- Malaysia
- Maldives

_{ID - May enter with an ID card in lieu of a passport.}
_{IP - May enter with an internal passport in lieu of a passport.}
_{1 - Including all classes of British nationality.}
_{2 - Permanent residents may enter Kyrgyzstan without a visa for up to 30 days, provided they hold a return flight ticket and have the right to re-enter without a visa after 30 days after their departure from Kyrgyzstan.}

Date of visa changes

Citizens of Armenia, Azerbaijan, Belarus, Kazakhstan, Moldova, Russia, Tajikistan, Ukraine, Uzbekistan have never required a visa to enter Kyrgyzstan.

- 15 July 1981 (signed as USSR): Vietnam
- 10 January 1985 (signed as USSR): Cuba
- 22 January 1986 (signed as USSR): North Korea
- 1992: Georgia
- 1995: Malaysia
- 4 December 1999: Mongolia
- 1 July 2001: Japan
- 5 September 2006: Turkey
- 27 July 2012: Australia, Austria, Bahrain, Belgium, Brunei, Canada, Denmark, Estonia, Finland, France, Germany, Greece, Hungary (resumed), Iceland, Ireland, Italy, Kuwait, Latvia, Liechtenstein, Lithuania, Luxembourg, Malta, Monaco, Netherlands, New Zealand, Norway, Portugal, Qatar, Saudi Arabia, Singapore, South Korea, Spain, Sweden, Switzerland, United Arab Emirates, United Kingdom, United States and Vatican City
- 8 November 2018: Serbia
- 6 August 2021: Albania, Bulgaria, Cyprus, Israel, Mexico, North Macedonia, Romania, Thailand, Vietnam
- 20 August 2023: Maldives
- 21 October 2023: China, Hong Kong and Macau

Cancelled:

- Turkmenistan: Unknown
- Hungary: 1 December 1997 (was resumed in 2012)

A visa not required for holders of United Nations laissez-passer for up to 60 days.

==== Conditional visa exemption ====
Citizens of the following countries may enter Kyrgyzstan without a visa for an indefinite period if they permanently reside in their respective countries, have a hotel reservation and have a return ticket. If they live in other countries, they will need to apply for an e-Visa.

- Cuba
- North Korea

- In addition, citizens of China and India arriving through the checkpoint at Manas International Airport may enter Kyrgyzstan without a visa for up to 7 days if:
  - they have a voucher (which may be purchased on arrival at Manas International Airport) with a value of at least USD 500 and a return air ticket to their country of citizenship or to a third country with the right to re-enter without a visa after 21 days from the date of departure;
  - they enter with long-term visas (for a period of more than 3 years) issued by any Schengen Area member state, the United Kingdom or the United States, where they may enter Kyrgyzstan without a visa for up to 7 days with the right to re-enter without a visa after 21 days from the date of departure.

=== Non-ordinary passports ===
In addition to countries whose citizens are visa-exempt, only holders of diplomatic or official / service passports of China, India, Indonesia, Iran, Morocco and Turkmenistan may enter Kyrgyzstan without a visa.

== Visa on arrival ==
Citizens of the following countries and territories may obtain a visa on arrival at Manas International Airport for the following period:

Indefinite period

- Iran^{1}

1 month

- Indonesia
- Philippines
- South Africa
- Venezuela

_{1 - Citizens of Iran who travel for business or tourist purposes may obtain a visa on arrival at Manas International Airport. They must present proof confirming the purpose of their stay.}

=== Conditional visa on arrival ===
Citizens of the following countries with a residence permit issued by any GCC member state or Brunei may obtain a visa on arrival at Manas International Airport for a maximum of 1 month if they travel as tourists:

- Algeria
- Bangladesh
- Egypt
- India
- Jordan
- Lebanon
- Libya
- Morocco
- Nepal
- Pakistan
- Sri Lanka
- Tunisia
- Yemen

== Electronic visa (e-Visa) ==
Kyrgyzstani e-VISA

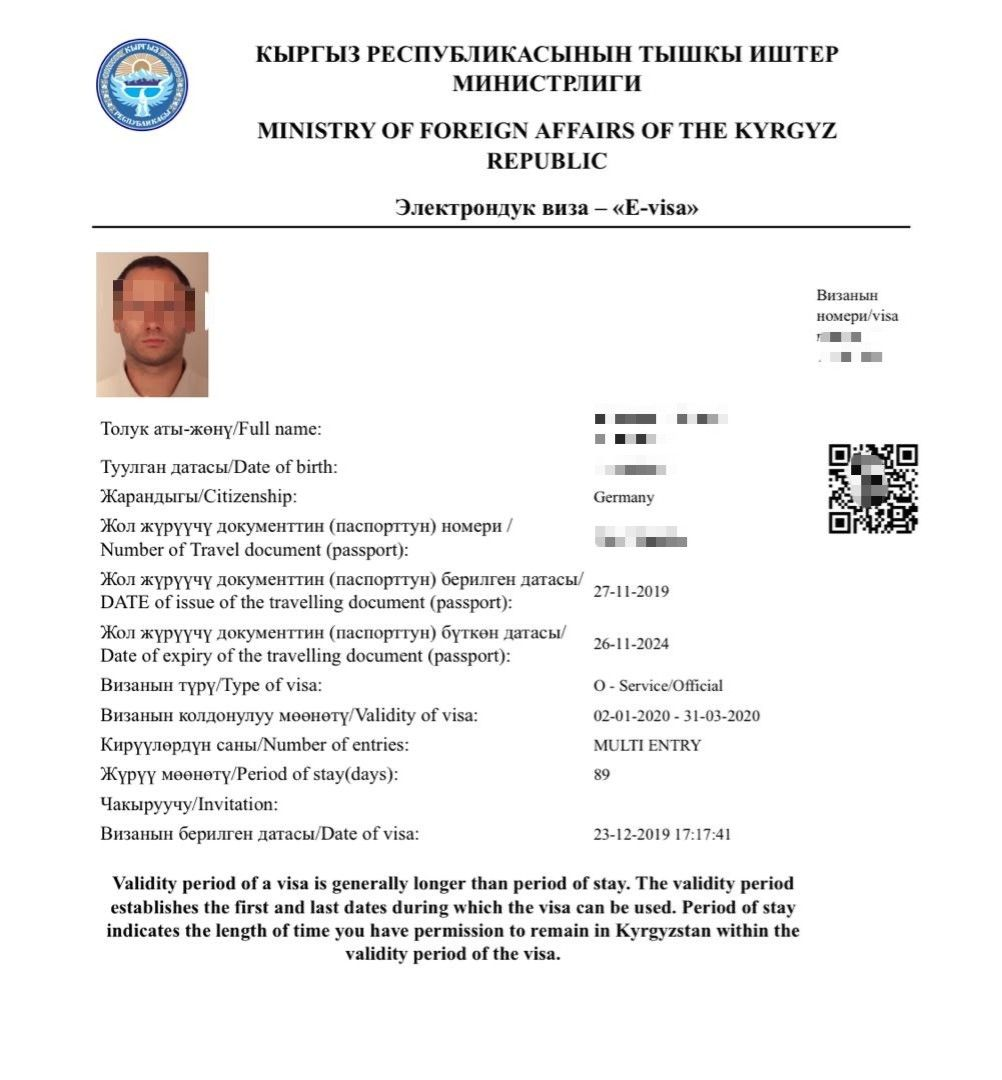
- Sample of Kyrgyzstani Service eVisa
- Owner: Ministry of Foreign Affairs
- Website: evisa.e-gov.kg

From 1 September 2017, citizens of all countries and territories may apply for a business, tourist or group tourist visa valid for 30 or 60 days through the e-Visa system.

e-Visa holders must arrive via Manas or Osh airports, or through land crossings with China (at Irkeshtam and Torugart), Kazakhstan (at Ak-jol, Ak-Tilek, Chaldybar, Chon-Kapka), Tajikistan (at Bor-Dobo, Kulundu, Kyzyl-Bel) and Uzbekistan (at Dostuk-Dostlik, north of Osh).

Holders of passports issued by Hong Kong, Macau and Taiwan must select China when applying for an e-Visa.

== Admission restrictions ==
Entry and transit is refused to citizens of Kosovo, even if not leaving the aircraft and proceeding by the same flight. Kyrgyzstan also does not recognize the passports of Abkhazia, the Sahrawi Republic, Somaliland, South Ossetia and Transnistria.

== Visitor statistics ==
Year	Visitors
1992—1994	No data
1995	▲36,000
1996	▲42,000
1997	▲87,000
1998	▼59,000
1999	▼48,000
2000	▲59,000
2001	▲99,000
2002	▲140,000
2003	▲342,000
2004	▲398,000
2005	▼319,000
2006	▲766,000
2007	▲1,656,000
2008	▲2,379,000
2009	▲2,451,000
2010	▼1,224,000
2011	▲3,025,000
2012	▲3,393,000
2013	▲4,134,000
2014	▼3,791,000
2015	▲4,000,000
2016	▼3,853,000
2017	▲4,568,000
2018	▲6,900,000
Total (1995—2018)	More 43,770,000

Most visitors arriving in Kyrgyzstan were from the following countries of nationality:

Country	2017	2016	2015	2014
Kazakhstan	▲1,833,900	▼1,787,100	▼1,989,200	▼1,998,500
Uzbekistan	▲479,600	▲150,700	▼60,900	▼125,900
Russia	▲471,400	▼431,000	▲528,700	▼447,700
Tajikistan	▲250,900	▲169,500	▲117,600	▼79,300
Turkey	▲54,300	▲36,800	▲36,100	▲33,000
China	▲39,500	▲36,600	▲35,800	▼29,900
India	▲19,600	▲11,400	▲7,600	▲4,200
United States	▲14,200	▼13,900	▲19,200	▼14,300
Germany	▲13,100	▼11,100	▲16,700	▲15,200
South Korea	▲13,100	▲10,300	▼7,000	▲10,500
Azerbaijan	▲8,500	▲8,100	▲5,300	▲3,700
Ukraine	▼8,200	▲141,300	▲133,600	▲5,800
France	▲7,500	▲2,900	▲5,800	▼5,100
United Kingdom	▲6,900	▼6,600	▲6,900	▲4,400
Georgia	– 5,700	▲5,700	▲2,500	▲1,800
Total	▲4,666,500	▼4,147,420	▼4,335,200	▼4,418,600

== See also ==
- Visa requirements for Kyrgyzstani citizens
