= Bakyt Amanbaev =

Kyrgyzstani diplomat (born 1969)

Baktybek A. Amanbaev
- Аманбаев Бактыбек Абдилашимович
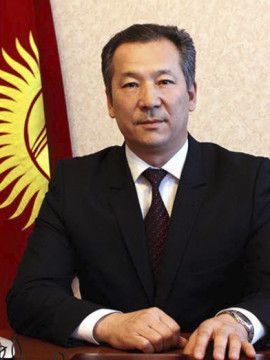
- Baktybek A. Amanbaev

Ambassador of Kyrgyzstan to the United States and Canada
- Incumbent
- Assumed office April 16, 2021
- President: Sadyr Japarov
- Prime Minister: Ulukbek Maripov; Akylbek Japarov
- Preceded by: Bolot Otunbaev

Personal details
- Born: 11 May 1969 (age 57)
- Education: Kennesaw State University Diplomatic Academy of the Ministry of Foreign Affairs (Kyrgyzstan); Bishkek International School of Business and Management; Kyrgyz National University

Baktybek Abdilashimovich Amanbaev (Kyrgyz: Аманбаев Бактыбек Абдилашим уулу; Russian: Аманбаев Бактыбек Абдилашимович; born 1969) has served as the Kyrgyz ambassador to the United States and Canada since April 2021.

== Early life and education ==
Amanbaev was born in 1969. Amanbaev studied at Kennesaw State University in the US state of Georgia (2012), graduated from the diplomatic academy of the Ministry of Foreign Affairs of the Kyrgyz Republic (2010), obtained a political science graduate degree from the Kyrgyz National University (2010), a Master of Business Administration from the Bishkek International School of Business and Management (1998), and an undergraduate degree from the Kyrgyz National University (1996).

== Early career ==
From 2000–2004, Amanbaev served as a senior consultant of the member of the Jogorku Kenesh (parliament) of the Kyrgyz Republic.
Between 2000–2007 he was a correspondent Radio Azattyk, the Kyrgyz service of Radio Free Europe/Radio Liberty.
From 2005–2007 he was director of the advertising and commercial agency of the Kyrgyz State Broadcasting Company.
From 2005–2008 he was a senior lecturer of political science at the Kyrgyz National University. He also served as editor-in-chief of the newspapers "Sayasat Press" and "Aiyl Demi" from 2010-2011.

Amanbaev was selected as a candidate for deputy by the Mekenchil Party in the 2020 parliamentary election. After the elections were annulled during the 2020 revolution, he became chief of staff of the new government, holding the rank of minister.

== Public service ==
2010: vice mayor of the city Osh, Kyrgyzstan’s second largest city
2011–2012: head of the press service of the parliament (Jogorku Kenesh) of the Kyrgyz Republic
2013–2015: ombudsman of the Kyrgyz Republic; the office of the ombudsman acts as an independent advocate for human rights on behalf of private citizens and NGOs and had the authority to recommend cases for court review

== 2020 ==
After the 2020 Kyrgyz protests, Amanbaev became chief of staff of the government of the Kyrgyz Republic-Minister of the Kyrgyz Republic. In April 2021, Amanbaev was appointed ambassador extraordinary and plenipotentiary of the Kyrgyz Republic to the United States.
