= Timeline of Bishkek =

The following is a timeline of the history of the city of Bishkek, Kyrgyzstan.

== 19th–20th centuries ==
- 1825 – Built as one of 35 fortresses built in the region by Khokand to extend control over the Chu valley.
- 1860 – Conquered by a detachment of 600 Russians from Vernoe in a 7-day assault.
- 1864 – Became an important Cossack base and a regular relay point for the imperial mail service.
- 1895 – The city elected its first mayor.
- 1926 – The city became capital of the Kirghiz Autonomous Socialist Soviet Republic; Pishpek renamed "Frunze."
- 1925 – Batratskaya Pravda newspaper begins publication.
- 1938 – Botanical Garden founded.
- 1954 – Frunze Polytechnic Institute founded.
- 1965 – Population: 355,000.
- 1974 – Vecherniy Bishkek newspaper begins publication.
- 1975 – Manas Airport begins operating.
- 1976 – Ala Archa National Park established near city.
- 1979 – Population: 552,000.
- 1984 – Ala-Too Square laid out.
- 1985 – White House built.
- 1990 – Kyrgyz Television begins broadcasting.
- 1991 – City renamed "Bishkek."
- 1992 – Dordoy Bazaar in business (approximate date).
- 1993
  - International University of Kyrgyzstan established.
  - Jumabek Ibraimov becomes mayor.
- 1995
  - Boris Silayev becomes mayor.
  - Population: 583,900 (estimate).
- 1996 – International Atatürk-Alatoo University established.
- 1998
  - Felix Kulov becomes mayor.
  - "Church in Bishkek" founded.
- 1999 – The Times of Central Asia English-language newspaper begins publication.

== 21st century ==
- 2001 – Manas Air Base of the United States military established outside city.
- 2005
  - 24 March: Protest against Akayev regime.
  - Arstanbek Nogoev becomes mayor.
  - Institute for Public Policy founded.
- 2006 – Protest against Bakiyev regime.
- 2007
  - Demonstration against Bakiyev regime.
  - Daniar Usenov becomes mayor.
- 2008 – Nariman Tuleyev becomes mayor.
- 2009 – Population: 846,256.
- 2010
  - 2010 Kyrgyzstani riots.
  - Isa Omurkulov becomes mayor (approximate date).
- 2011 – TEDx Bishkek begins.
- 2016 – Albek Ibraimov becomes mayor.
- 2017 – Turkish Airlines Flight 6491, a cargo flight with 4 crew members, crashes while attempting to land at Manas International Airport near Bishkek, killing the 4 crew members and another 34 on the ground, including 17 children, at Dacha-SU, a residential enclave near the airport.

== See also ==
- Bishkek history (ru)
- List of mayors of Bishkek
- List of universities in Bishkek
- Other names of Bishkek

== Bibliography ==
- Irina Kostyukova (1994). "The towns of Kyrgyzstan change their faces: Rural-urban migrants in Bishkek". Central Asian Survey. 13.
- A. Botoyeva (2007). "The institutionalization of novel shopping places in a post-soviet country. The case of supermarkets in Bishkek, Kyrgyzstan". Movements, Migrants, Marginalization. Stuttgart: Ibidem Verlag.
- Philipp Schröder (2010). "'Urbanizing' Bishkek: interrelations of boundaries, migration, group size and opportunity structure". Central Asian Survey. 29.
