= Bishkek-1 railway station =

Railway station in Bishkek, Kyrgyzstan

Bishkek-1
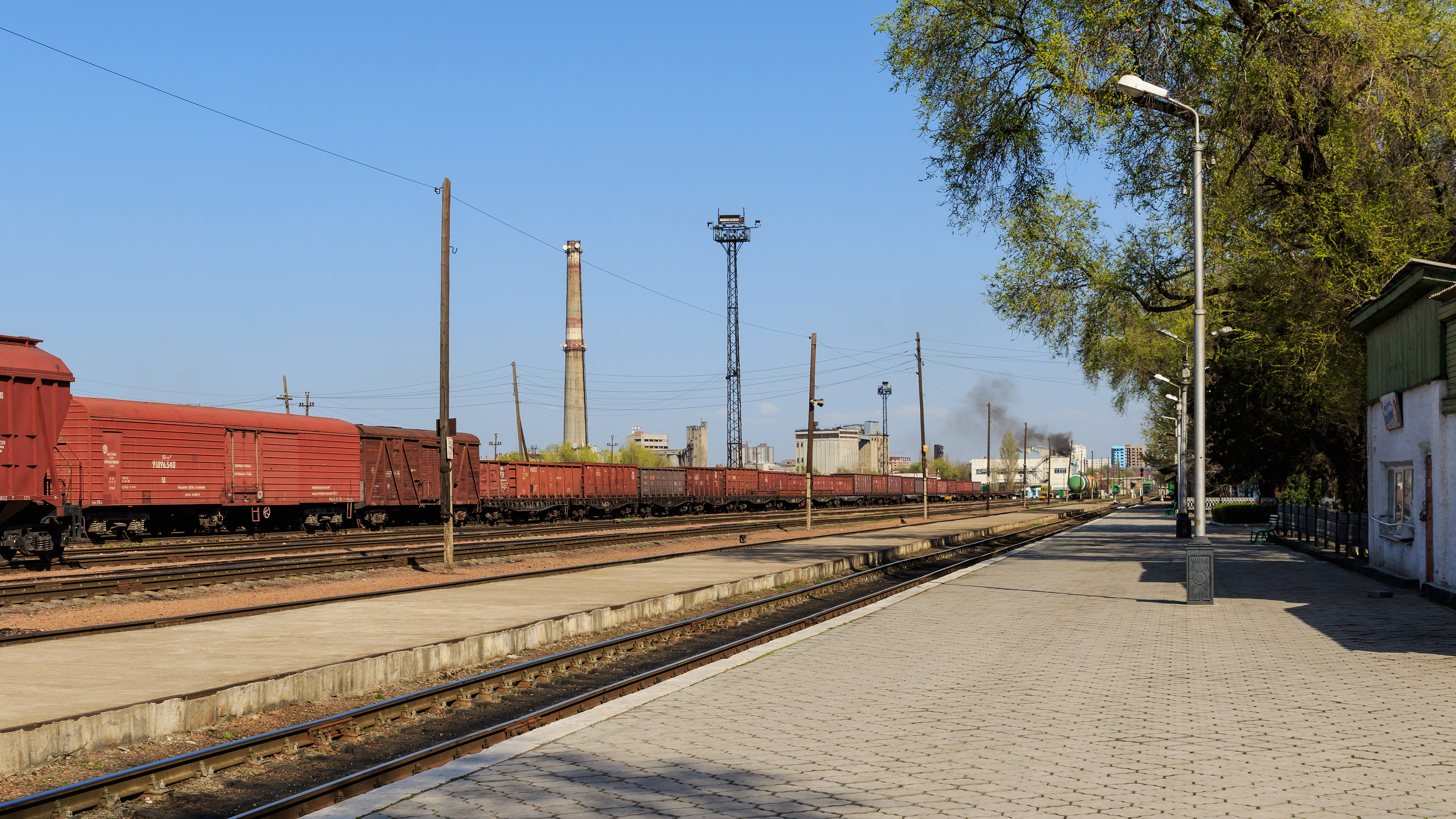

General information
- Location: Bishkek; Kyrgyzstan
- Coordinates: 42°51′59″N 74°33′6″E
- System: Kyrgyz Railways
- Owner: Kyrgyz Railways
Location

Bishkek-1 (Kyrgyz: Бишкек 1) is a train station located in the western part of Bishkek, Kyrgyzstan. Bishkek-2 railway station is located in the city center, while this station is located in the western part of the city.

== Trains ==
- Bishkek — Novokuznetsk
- Bishkek — Shu

== See also ==
- Kyrgyz Railways
- Bishkek-2 railway station
