= Tuleyev =

Tuleyev is a surname. Notable people with the surname include:

- Aman Tuleyev (1944–2023), Russian statesman
- Nariman Tuleyev, Kyrgyz railway developer
