= Chüy Prospect =

Avenue in Bishkek, Kyrgyzstan

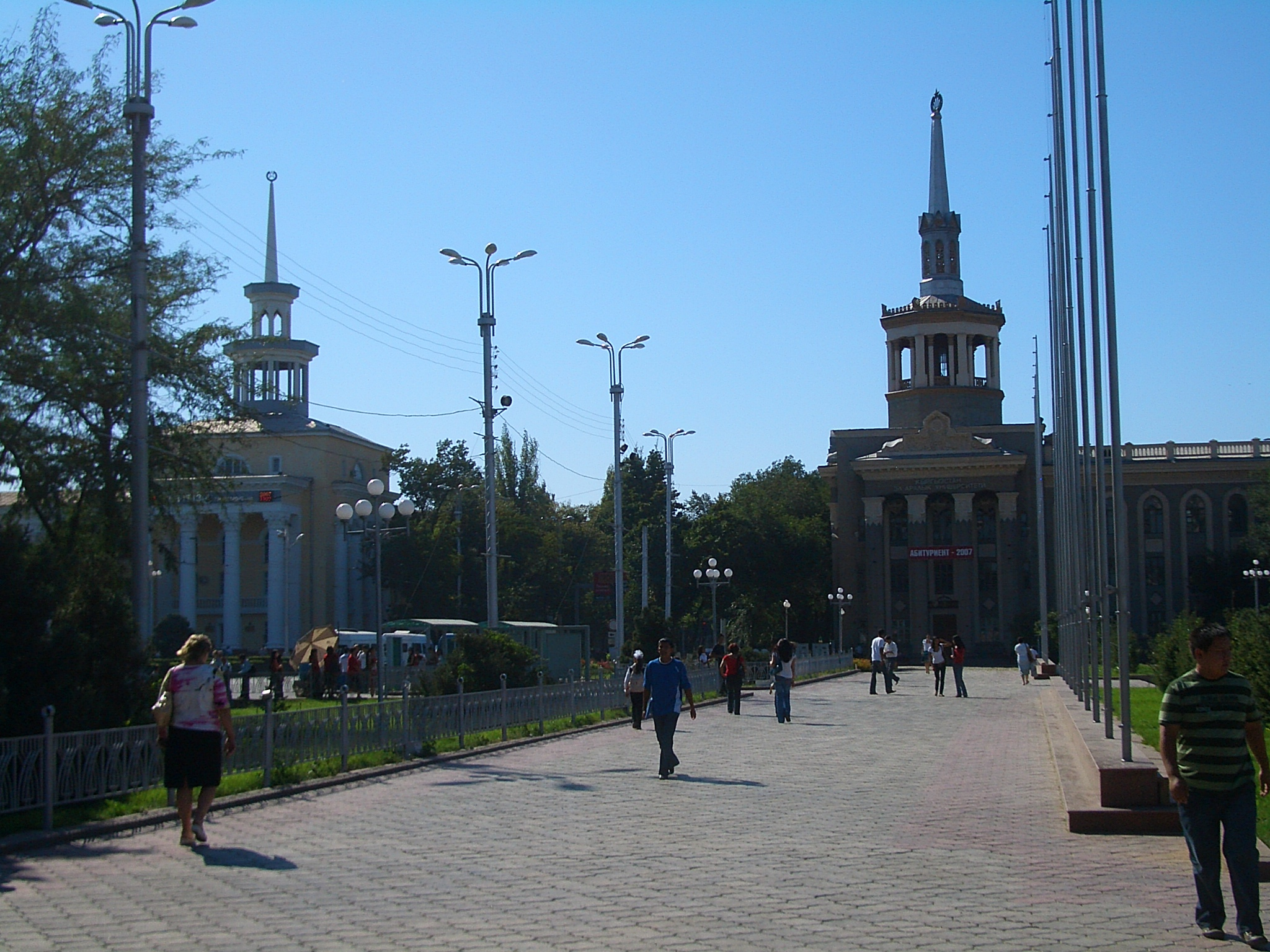
- Interactive map of Chüy Prospect
- Native name: Чүй проспекти (Kyrgyz); Чуйский проспект (Russian)
- Former name(s): Leninskiy Prospect, Ulitsa XXII Parts'ezda, Stalin Street, Grazhdanskaya, Kupecheskaya
- Location: Bishkek
- Coordinates: 42.8754°N 74.6198°E

Other
- Known for: Kyrgyz Academy of Sciences, Osh bazaar, Bishkek City Major's Office, Philharmonic Hall

Chüy Prospect (Kyrgyz: Чүй проспекти, Russian: Чуйский проспект, romanized: Chuysky prospekt) is a major avenue in Bishkek, Kyrgyzstan. It stretches from the eastern border of Bishkek to Deng Xiaoping Prospect in the west.

== History ==
Chüy Prospect originated as Kupecheskaya (Merchant) Street, and in 1924 it was renamed to Grazhdanskaya (Civic) Street. From 1936 it was known as Stalin Street, 1961 - XXII Parts'ezd Street, and in 1974 as Lenin Prospect. Before the October Revolution the street had such buildings as Serafim Church, Tatar Mosque and medrese, and many small merchants' shops, timber houses, and clay-walled huts. In the 1920s the church was adapted into a social club, while the mosque and medrese were converted to a school. None of them survived to the present day.
