= List of monuments of Bishkek =

The following is a list of public monuments in Bishkek, the capital of Kyrgyzstan.

== Monuments in Bishkek ==
Name	Image	Location
Manas Statue		Ala-Too Square
Monument to Chinghiz Aitmatov		Ala-Too Square
Monument to Kalyk Akiev		near Kyrgyz Academy of Sciences
Monument to the Kyrgyz Revolution of 2010 and the Aksy Events		
Akynov Alley		
Alley of the Heroes of World War II		
Alley of Kyrgyz Statesmen of the 20th Century		Pushkin Street
Lifeguards Alley		Victory Park
Monument to Maksim Ammosov		Oak Park
Monument to Mustafa Kemal Atatürk		Atatürk Park
Monument to Mukhtar Auezov		Oak Park
Batken War Monument		Kiev-Logvinenko Street
Monument to the Leningrad Blockade		
Monument to Talgat Bigeldinov		
Monument to Yūsuf Balasaguni		Kyrgyz National University
Monument to the Revolution Fighters		Revolution Fighters Square
Monument to Shoqan Walikhanov		
Monument to Felix Dzherzhinsky		
Friendship of the People's and the Workers Glory		Kyrgyz State Historical Museum
Monument of the Friendship of the People's		Chuy Avenue
Monument to Imanali Aidarbekov		
Monument to Shabdan Baatyr		Kozhomkul Sports Center
Monument to Karl Marx and Friedrich Engels.		
Monument to Genady Pavliuk		
Monument to Aaly Tokombaev		
Monument to I.K. Akhunbaev		Kyrgyz State Medical Academy
Victory Monument		Victory Square
Monument to Mikhail Frunze		Train Station Square
Ivan Panfilov Monument		Duboviy Park
Stella of Friendship of Nation		
Monument to Hero of the Soviet Union Cholponbai Tuleberdiev		
Monument to Togolok Moldo		in the park after Togolok Moldo
Monument to Sopubek Begaliev		Intersection of Erkindik Boulevard and Frunze Street

== See also ==
- Culture of Kyrgyzstan
- Ministry of Culture, Information and Tourism (Kyrgyz Republic)
- Tourism in Kyrgyzstan
