= 2018 in religion =

This is a timeline of events during the year 2018 which relate to religion.

== Events ==
- 26 February to 10 March – Anti-Muslim riots break out in Sri Lanka in which Buddhist rioters attacked Muslims.
- 9 April – Pope Francis publishes Gaudete et exsultate as an apostolic exhortation.
- 13 May – Islamist terrorists and their children carry out several suicide bombings against churches in Surabaya, Indonesia.
- 1 June - In Germany, The state Bavaria pass a Kreuzpflicht Law that requires crosses in all public buildings.
- 16 August – The Church of Jesus Christ of Latter-day Saints abandons the word Mormon when referring to the church and its members.
- 25 August – Pope Francis visits Ireland.
- 2 September – The Bishkek Central Mosque, the largest mosque in Central Asia, is inaugurated.
- 14 September – The Russian Orthodox Church declares that it is ending relations with the Ecumenical Patriarchate of Constantinople after it announces its intention to grant independence to the Orthodox Church of Ukraine.
- 22 September – Pope Francis visits the Baltic states.
- 27 October – A gunman attacks the Tree of Life – Or L'Simcha Congregation in Pittsburgh, Pennsylvania.
- 31 October – Christian woman Asia Bibi is acquitted of blasphemy by the Supreme Court of Pakistan.
