= Bishkek =

Capital and largest city of Kyrgyzstan

Bishkek Бишкек
- Capital city

Kyrgyz transcription(s)
  - ISO 9: Biškek
  - BGN/PCGN: Bishkek
  - ALA-LC: Bishkek
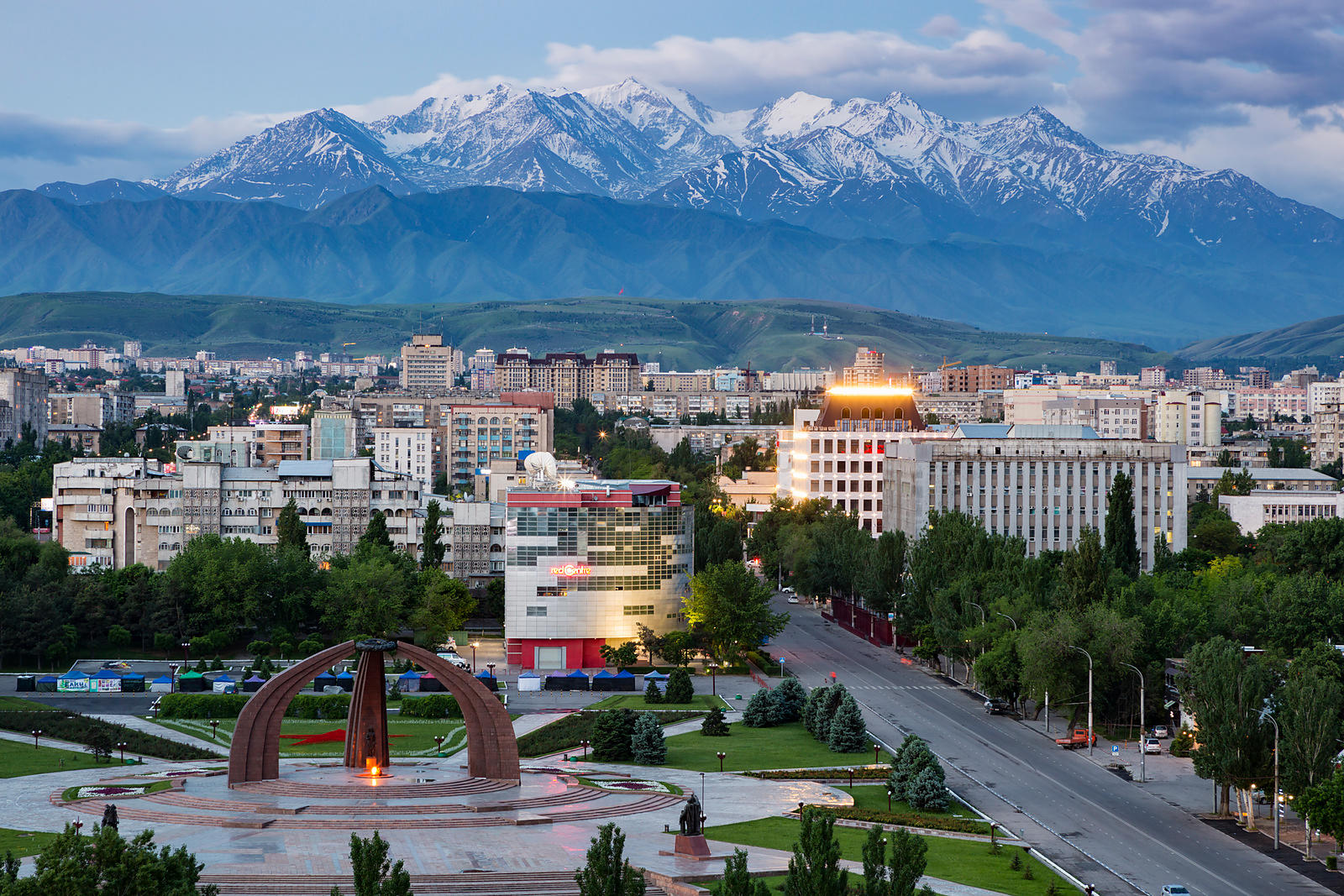
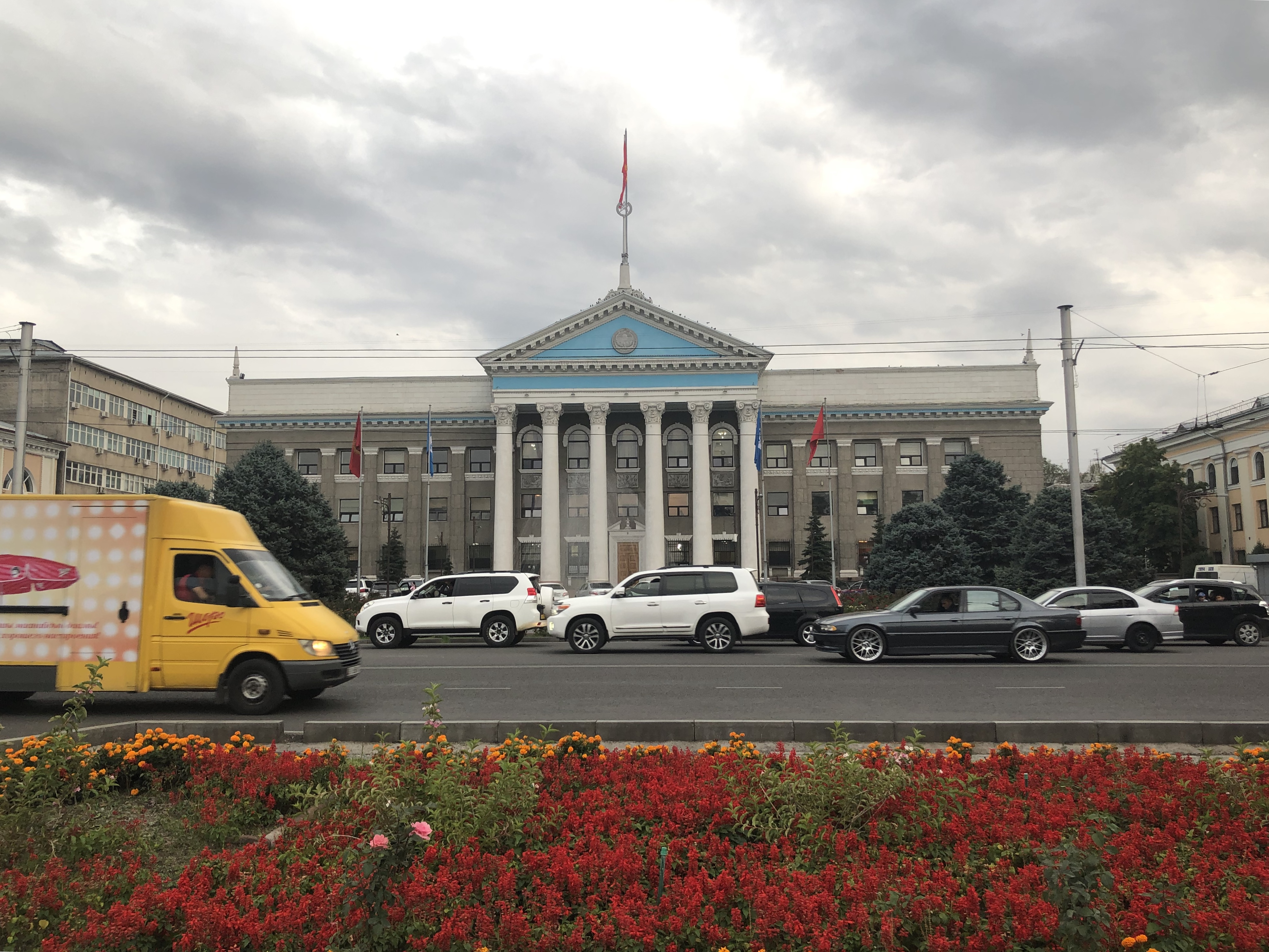
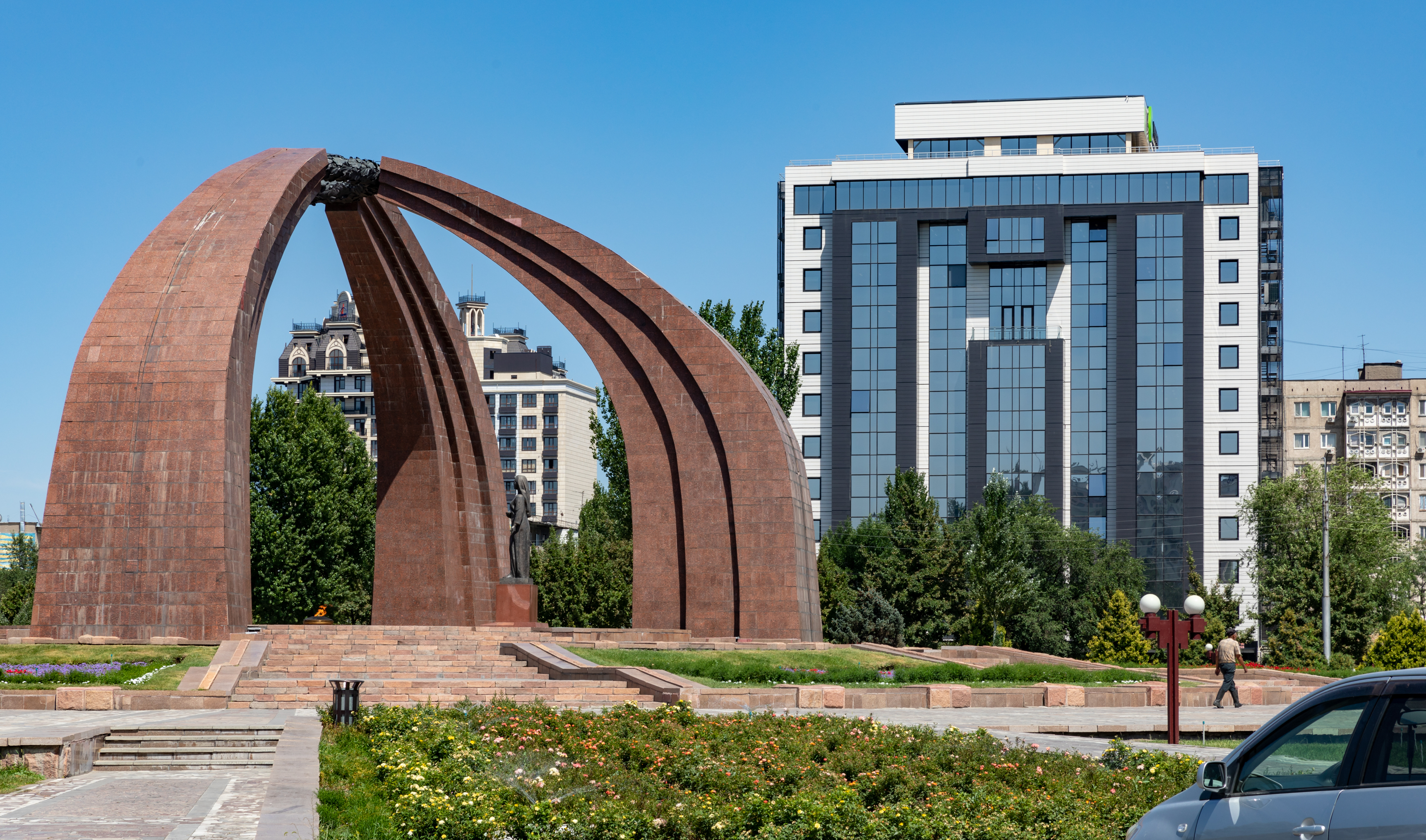
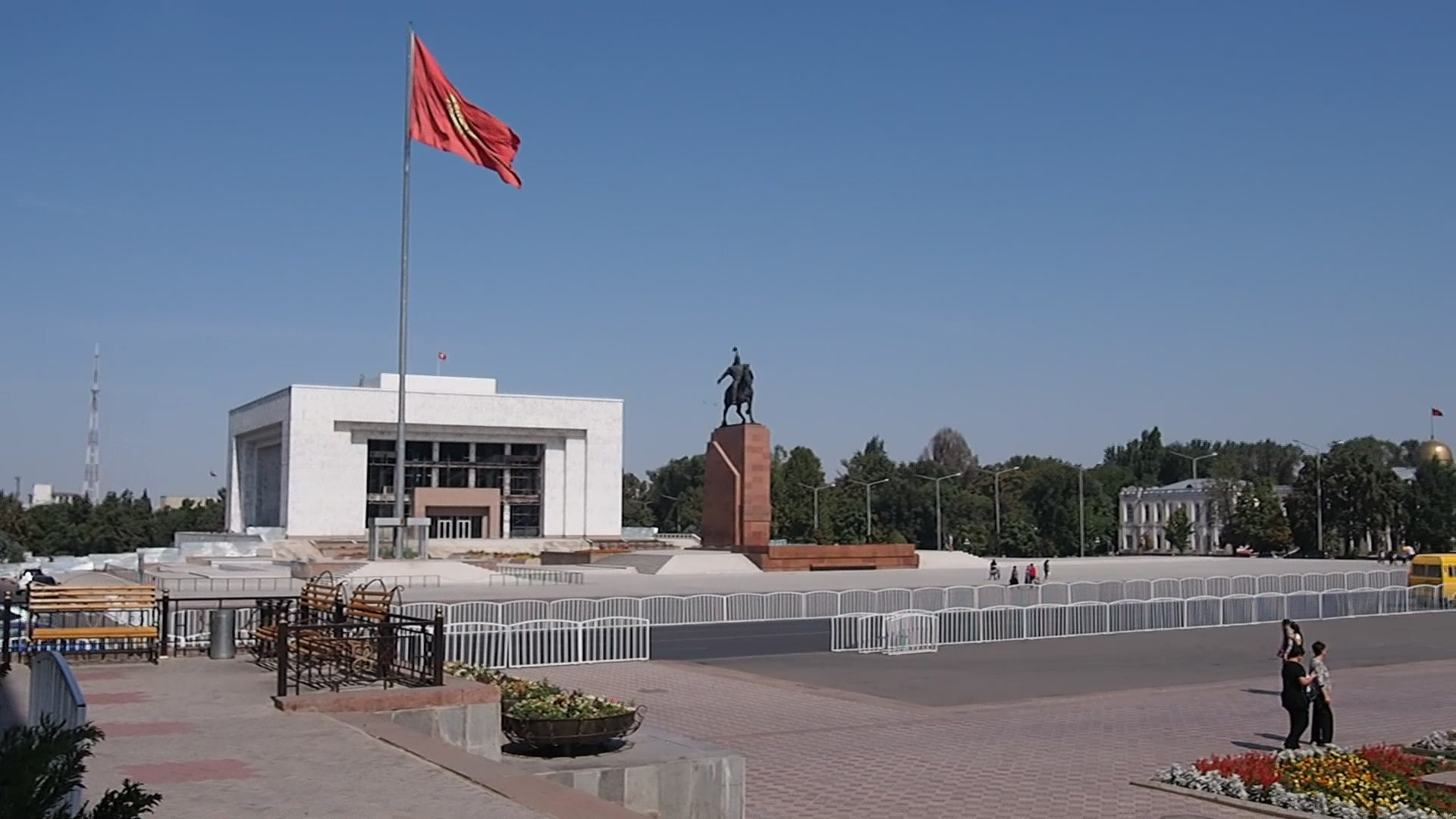
- Bishkek's skyline and the Kyrgyz Ala-Too Range Bishkek City Hall Bishkek Central Mosque Victory Square Ala-Too Square

- Flag Coat of arms

- Location within Kyrgyzstan Location within Asia
- Coordinates: 42°52′29″N 74°36′44″E
- Country: Kyrgyzstan
- City: Bishkek
- Founded: 1825
- District: Districts: Birinchi May; Lenin; Oktyabr; Sverdlov

Government
  - Mayor: Aibek Junushaliev

Area
  - Capital city: 386.0 km^{2} (149.0 sq mi)
- Elevation: 800 m (2,600 ft)

Population (2025)
  - Capital city: 1,120,827
  - Density: 2,904/km^{2} (7,521/sq mi)
  - Metro: 1,321,900
- Demonym(s): бишкектик, bishkektik (Kyrgyz) бишкекчанин (male), бишкекчанка (female), bishkekchanin (male), bishkekchanka (female) (Russian)

GDP (nominal, 2023)
  - Capital city: KGS 595.3 billion (US$6.8 billion)
  - Per capita: KGS 531,126 (US$6,074)
- Time zone: UTC+06:00 (KGT)
- Postal code: 720000–720085
- Area code: (+996) 312
- ISO 3166 code: KG-GB
- Vehicle registration: B, E, 01
- HDI (2023): 0.757 high · 1st
- Website: meria.kg (in Kyrgyz, Russian, and English)

Bishkek, (Note: Kyrgyz and Russian: Бишкек; Kyrgyz pronunciation: [b̥ɪɕkʰékʰ], Russian pronunciation: [bʲɪʂˈkʲek]) formerly known as Pishpek (until 1926), (Note: Kyrgyz and Russian: Пишпек) and then Frunze (1926–1991), (Note: Kyrgyz and Russian: Фрунзе) is the capital and largest city of Kyrgyzstan, and the capital of the Chüy Region. (Note: The region surrounds the city, although the city itself is not part of the region but rather a region-level unit of Kyrgyzstan.) It is situated near the border with Kazakhstan and has a population of around 1,200,000 people as of 2024.

The Khanate of Kokand established the fortress of Pishpek in 1825 to control local caravan routes and to collect tribute from Kyrgyz tribes. On 4 September 1860, with the approval of the Kyrgyz, Russian forces led by Colonel Apollon Zimmermann destroyed the fortress. In the present day, the fortress ruins can be found just north of Jibek Jolu Street, near the new main mosque. A Russian settlement was established in 1868 on the site of the fortress under its original name, Pishpek. It lay within the General Governorship of Russian Turkestan and its Semirechye Oblast.

The Kara-Kirghiz Autonomous Oblast was established in 1925 in Russian Turkestan, promoting Pishpek to its capital. In 1926, the Communist Party of the Soviet Union renamed the city Frunze, after Bolshevik military leader Mikhail Frunze (1885–1925), who was born there. Frunze became the capital of the Kirghiz Soviet Socialist Republic in 1936, during the final stages of national delimitation in the Soviet Union. In 1991, the Kyrgyz parliament changed the capital's name to a modified original name of Pishpek as Bishkek.

Bishkek is situated at an altitude of about 800 metres (2,600 ft), just off the northern fringe of the Kyrgyz Ala-Too Range, an extension of the Tian Shan mountain range. These mountains rise to a height of 4,895 metres (16,060 ft). North of the city, a fertile and gently undulating steppe extends far north into neighbouring Kazakhstan. The river Chüy drains most of the area. Bishkek is connected to the Turkestan–Siberia Railway by a spur line.

Bishkek is a very large city of wide boulevards and marble-faced public buildings combined with numerous Soviet-style apartment blocks surrounding interior courtyards. There are also thousands of smaller, privately built houses, mostly outside the city centre. Streets follow a grid pattern, with most flanked on both sides by narrow irrigation channels, which provide water to trees which provide shade during the hot summers.

== Etymology ==
Bishkek is supposedly named after the paddle used to churn fermenting milk.

The official website of Bishkek's city hall provides the following etymological justification for the name of the city: the pregnant wife of a hero lost a paddle used to churn kumis. While looking for it, she suddenly gave birth to a boy, who she named Bishkek. Bishkek would grow up to be a noble figure and after his death, was buried on a mound near the banks of the Alamüdün. There, a tombstone was erected. The building was seen and described by travelers of the 17th and 18th centuries.

Under Soviet rule, from 1926 to 1991, the city was named Frunze in honour of Bolshevik Mikhail Frunze.

== History ==
Based on DNA evidence, the area near Bishkek is considered one of the possible origins of the Black Death between AD 1346 and 1353.

=== Kokhand rule ===
Originally a caravan rest stop, possibly founded by the Sogdians, on one of the branches of the Silk Road through the Tian Shan range, the location was fortified in 1825 by the khan of Kokand with a mud fort. In the last years of Kokhand rule, the Pishpek fortress was led by Atabek, the Datka. In 1844, the forces of Ormon Khan, the leader of the Kara-Kyrgyz Khanate, briefly captured the fortress.

=== Tsarist era ===
In 1860, Imperial Russia annexed the area, and the military forces of Colonel Apollon Zimmerman took and razed the fort. Colonel Zimmermann rebuilt the town over the destroyed fort and appointed field-Poruchik Titov as head of a new Russian garrison. The Imperial Russian government redeveloped the site from 1877 onward, encouraging the settlement of Russian peasants by giving them fertile land to develop.

=== Soviet era ===
In 1926, the city became the capital of the newly established Kirghiz ASSR and was renamed Frunze after Mikhail Frunze, Lenin's close associate who was born in Bishkek and played key roles during the revolutions of 1905 and 1917 and during the Russian Civil War of the early 1920s.

=== Independence era ===
The early 1990s were a tumultuous time for Bishkek. In June 1990, a state of emergency was declared following severe ethnic riots in southern Kyrgyzstan that threatened to spread to the capital. The city was renamed Bishkek on 5 February 1991, and Kyrgyzstan achieved independence later that year during the breakup of the Soviet Union. Before independence, the majority of Bishkek's population were ethnic Russians. In 2004, Russians made up approximately 20% of the city's population, and about 7–8% in 2011.

Bishkek is Kyrgyzstan's financial centre, with all of the country's 21 commercial banks headquartered there. During the Soviet era, the city was home to many industrial plants, but most have been shut down since 1991 or now operate on a much-reduced scale. One of Bishkek's largest employment centres today is the Dordoy Bazaar open market, where many of the Chinese goods imported to CIS countries are sold.

== Geography ==
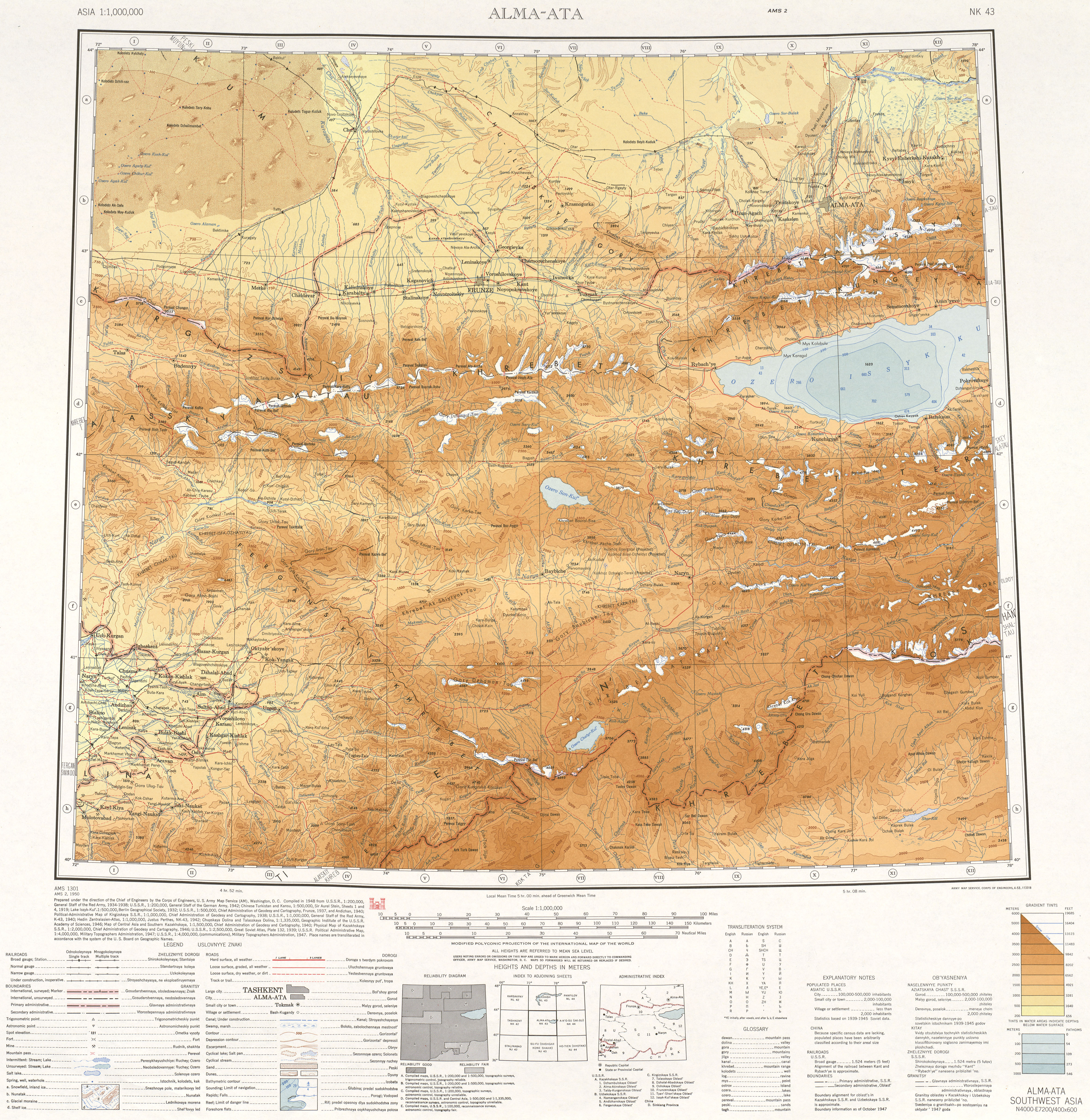
Map including Bishkek (labelled as Frunze) (AMS, 1948)

=== Orientation ===
Although Bishkek itself is relatively young, its surrounding area has some sites of interest dating to prehistoric times. There are also sites from the Greco-Buddhist period, the period of Nestorian influence, the era of the Central Asian khanates, and the Soviet period.

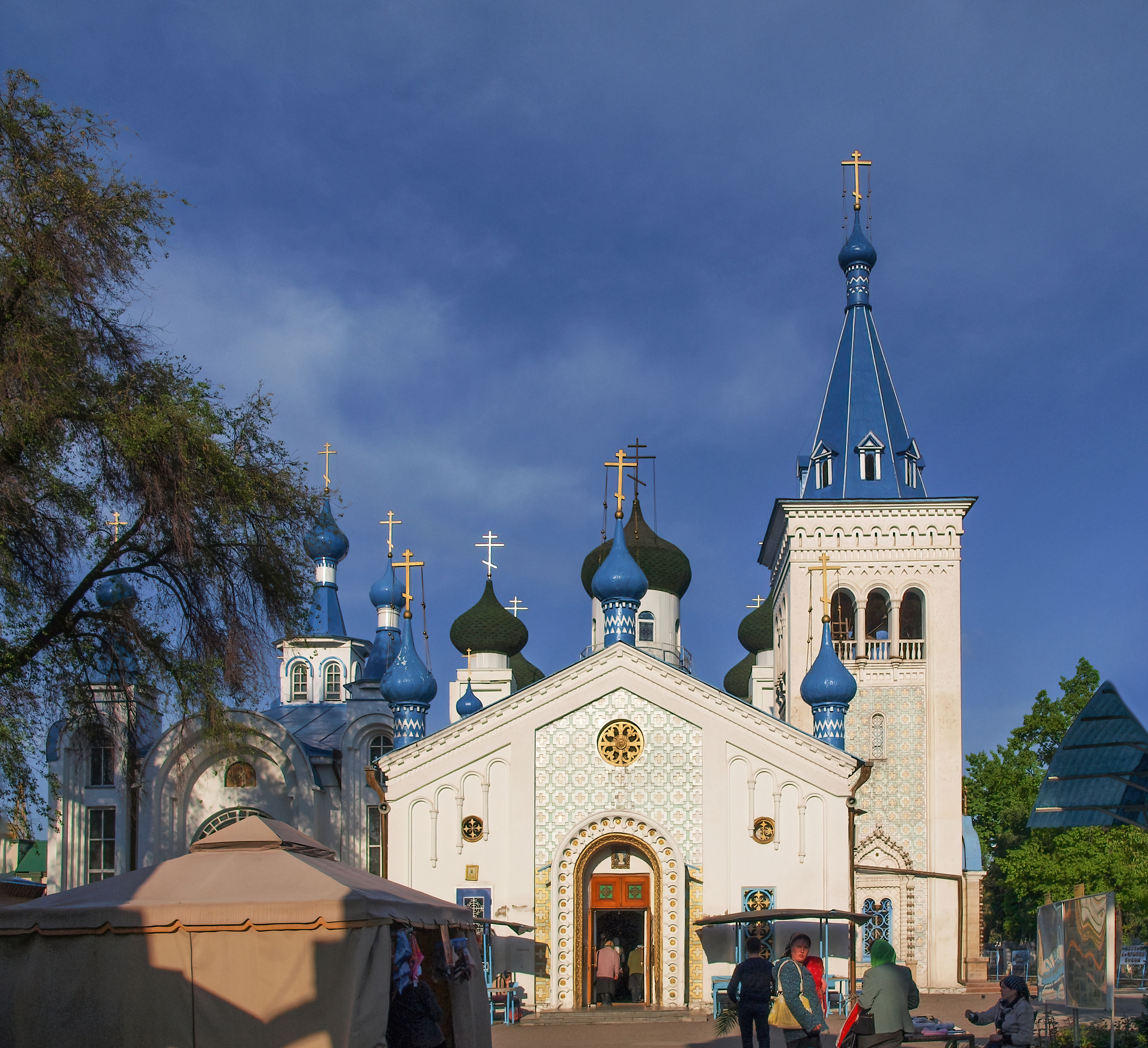
Russian Orthodox Cathedral of the Holy Resurrection

The central part of the city is laid out on a rectangular grid plan. The city's main street is the east-west Chüy Avenue (Chüy Prospekti), named after the region's main river. In the Soviet era, it was called Lenin Avenue. Along or near it are many important government buildings and universities. These include the Academy of Sciences compound. The westernmost section of the avenue is known as Deng Xiaoping Avenue.

Sovietskaya Street forms the primary north–south corridor through Bishkek. Officially, Sovietskaya Street has been renamed Yusup Abdrakhmanov Street, but it is still commonly referred to by its original name. Its northern and southern sections are called, respectively, Yelebesov and Baityk Batyr Streets. Several major shopping centres are located along with it, and in the north, it provides access to Dordoy Bazaar.

Erkindik ("Freedom") Boulevard runs from north to south, from the main railroad station (Bishkek II) south of Chüy Avenue to the museum quarter and sculpture park just north of Chüy Avenue, and further north toward the Ministry of Foreign Affairs. In the past, it was called Dzerzhinsky Boulevard, named after a Communist revolutionary, Felix Dzerzhinsky, and its northern continuation is still called Dzerzhinsky Street.

An important east–west street is Jibek Jolu ('Silk Road'). It runs parallel to Chüy Avenue about 2 km (1.2 mi) north of it and is part of the main east–west road of Chüy Region. Both the eastern and western bus terminals are located along Jibek Jolu.

There is a Roman Catholic church located at ul. Vasiljeva 197 (near Rynok Bayat). It is the only Catholic cathedral in Kyrgyzstan.

A stadium named in honour of Dolon Omurzakov is located near the centre of Bishkek. This is the largest stadium in the Kyrgyz Republic.

=== City centre ===
- Kyrgyz State Historical Museum, located in Ala-Too Square, the main city square.
- State Museum of Applied Arts, containing examples of traditional Kyrgyz handicrafts.
- Frunze House Museum.
- Statue of Ivan Panfilov in the park near the White House.
- An equestrian statue of Mikhail Frunze stands in a large park (Boulevard Erkindik) across from the train station.
- The train station was built in 1946 by German prisoners of war and has survived since then without further renovation or repairs; most of those who built it perished and were buried in unmarked pits near the station.
- The main government building, the White House, is a large seven-story marble building and the former headquarters of the Communist Party of the Kirghiz SSR.
- At Ala-Too Square there is an independence monument where the changing of the guards may be watched.
- Osh Bazaar, west of the city centre, is a large, picturesque produce market.
- Kyrgyz National Philharmonic, concert hall.

=== Outer neighbourhoods ===
The Dordoy Bazaar, just inside the bypass highway on the north-eastern edge of the city, is a major retail and wholesale market.

=== Outside the city ===
The Kyrgyz Ala-Too mountain range, some 40 kilometres (25 mi) away, provides a spectacular backdrop to the city; the Ala Archa National Park is only a 30- to 45-minute drive away.

=== Distances ===
Bishkek is about 300 km away directly from the country's second largest city Osh. However, its nearest large city is Almaty of Kazakhstan, which is 190 km to the east. Furthermore, it is 470 km from Tashkent (Uzbekistan), 680 km from Dushanbe (Tajikistan), and about 1,000 km each from Astana (Kazakhstan), Ürümqi (China), Islamabad (Pakistan), and Kabul (Afghanistan).

=== Climate ===
Bishkek has a Mediterranean-influenced humid continental climate (Köppen climate classification Dsa), as the average mean temperature in the winter is below 0 °C (32.0 °F). Average precipitation is around 440 millimetres (17 in) per year. Average daily high temperatures range from 3 °C (37.4 °F) in January to about 31 °C (87.8 °F) during July. The summer months are dominated by dry periods, punctuated by the occasional thunderstorm, which produces strong gusty winds and rare dust storms. The mountains to the south provide a natural boundary and protection from damaging weather, as does the smaller mountain chain that runs north-west to south-east. In the winter months, sparse snow storms and frequent heavy fog are the dominating features. There are sometimes temperature inversions, during which the fog can last for days at a time.

Climate data for Bishkek (1991–2020, extremes 1936–present)
Month	Jan	Feb	Mar	Apr	May	Jun	Jul	Aug	Sep	Oct	Nov	Dec	Year
Record high °C (°F)	20.0 (68.0)	25.4 (77.7)	30.5 (86.9)	34.7 (94.5)	36.7 (98.1)	40.9 (105.6)	42.1 (107.8)	39.7 (103.5)	37.1 (98.8)	34.2 (93.6)	29.8 (85.6)	23.7 (74.7)	42.1 (107.8)
Mean daily maximum °C (°F)	2.9 (37.2)	5.1 (41.2)	12.1 (53.8)	18.7 (65.7)	24.1 (75.4)	29.5 (85.1)	32.4 (90.3)	31.4 (88.5)	25.6 (78.1)	18.5 (65.3)	10.3 (50.5)	4.6 (40.3)	17.9 (64.2)
Daily mean °C (°F)	−2.7 (27.1)	−0.5 (31.1)	6.2 (43.2)	12.8 (55.0)	17.8 (64.0)	22.9 (73.2)	25.5 (77.9)	24.2 (75.6)	18.7 (65.7)	11.6 (52.9)	4.2 (39.6)	−1.1 (30.0)	11.6 (52.9)
Mean daily minimum °C (°F)	−7.1 (19.2)	−4.9 (23.2)	1.0 (33.8)	6.9 (44.4)	11.2 (52.2)	16.1 (61.0)	18.4 (65.1)	16.9 (62.4)	11.7 (53.1)	5.6 (42.1)	−0.5 (31.1)	−5.2 (22.6)	5.8 (42.4)
Record low °C (°F)	−31.9 (−25.4)	−34 (−29)	−21.8 (−7.2)	−12.3 (9.9)	−5.5 (22.1)	2.4 (36.3)	7.4 (45.3)	5.1 (41.2)	−2.8 (27.0)	−11.2 (11.8)	−32.2 (−26.0)	−29.1 (−20.4)	−34 (−29)
Average precipitation mm (inches)	28 (1.1)	36 (1.4)	48 (1.9)	71 (2.8)	59 (2.3)	34 (1.3)	19 (0.7)	15 (0.6)	18 (0.7)	37 (1.5)	45 (1.8)	37 (1.5)	455 (17.9)
Average extreme snow depth cm (inches)	5 (2.0)	3 (1.2)	1 (0.4)	0 (0)	0 (0)	0 (0)	0 (0)	0 (0)	0 (0)	0 (0)	1 (0.4)	3 (1.2)	5 (2.0)
Average rainy days	3	5	9	12	13	10	10	6	6	8	7	4	93
Average snowy days	9	9	5	2	0.3	0	0	0	0	1	4	7	37
Average relative humidity (%)	75	75	71	63	60	50	46	45	48	62	70	75	62
Mean monthly sunshine hours	137	128	153	194	261	306	332	317	264	196	144	114	2,546
Source 1: www.google.com
Source 2: NOAA (sun, 1961–1990)

== Demographics ==
Bishkek is the most populated city in Kyrgyzstan. Its population, estimated in 2021, was 1,074,075. From the foundation of the city to the mid-1990s, ethnic Russians and other peoples of European descent (Ukrainians, Germans) comprised the majority of the city's population. According to the 1970 census, the ethnic Kyrgyz were only 12.3%, while Russians comprised more than 80% of the Frunze population. According to the 2022 census, Bishkek is a predominantly Kyrgyz city, with 85% of its residents Kyrgyz, while population of Russian descent make up around 10% of the population.

Historical populations in Bishkek

Year	Pop.	±% p.a.
1876	182	—
1882	2,135	+50.74%
1893	4,857	+7.76%
1897	6,615	+8.03%
1902	9,656	+7.86%
1907	13,752	+7.33%
1913	20,102	+6.53%
1926	36,610	+4.72%
1939	92,783	+7.42%
1959	223,831	+4.50%

Year	Pop.	±% p.a.
1970	436,459	+6.26%
1979	535,450	+2.30%
1989	619,903	+1.48%
1999	762,308	+2.09%
2009	835,743	+0.92%
2010	846,500	+1.29%
2011	859,800	+1.57%
2012	874,400	+1.70%
2021	1,074,075	+2.31%

== Ecology and environment ==
=== Air quality ===
Emissions of air pollutants in Bishkek amounted to 14,400 tons in 2010. Among all cities in Kyrgyzstan, the level of air pollution in Bishkek is the highest, occasionally exceeding maximum allowable concentrations by several times, especially in the city centre. For example, concentrations of formaldehyde occasionally exceed maximum allowable limits by a factor of four. The hydrogeologist Zheenbek Kulbekov identifies coal-heating mainly in informal settlements (samozakhvat), the exhaust from private vehicles and the lack of air circulation as the three main factors for the grave air pollution in Kyrgyzstan's capital. The latter is mainly due to the haphazard construction of private multi-story buildings - in contradiction to former city plans developed up until the end of the USSR - which prompted discussion on a moratorium on the further construction of high-rise buildings.

Responsibility for ambient air quality monitoring in Bishkek lies with the Kyrgyz State Agency of Hydrometeorology. There are seven air-quality monitoring stations in Bishkek, measuring levels of sulfur dioxide, nitrogen oxides, formaldehyde, and ammonia.

== Economy ==
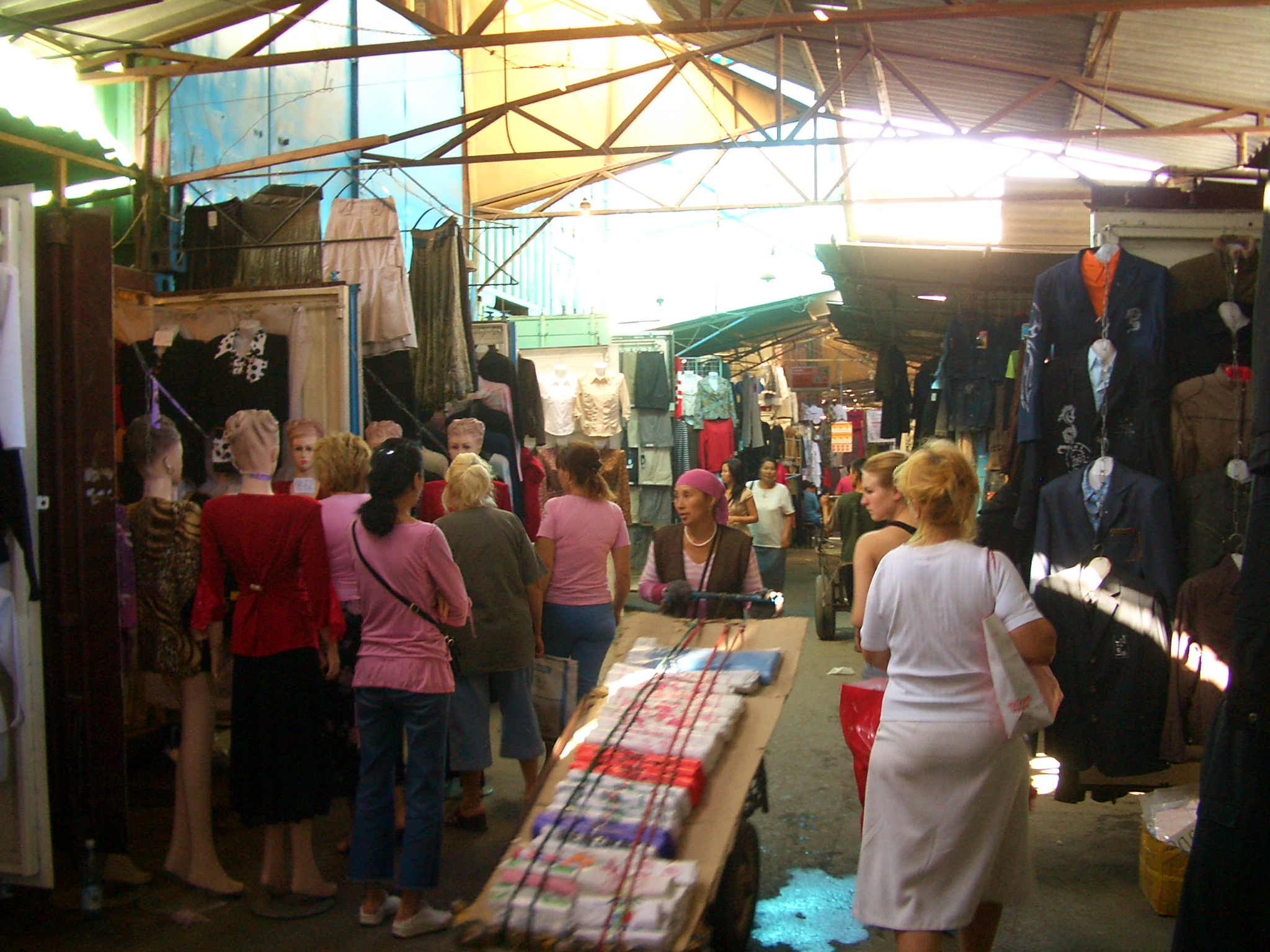
Dordoy Bazaar

Bishkek uses the Kyrgyzstan currency, the som. The som's value fluctuates regularly but averaged around 86 som per U.S. dollar as of November 2024. The economy in Bishkek is primarily agricultural, and agricultural products are sometimes bartered in the outlying regions. The streets of Bishkek are regularly lined with produce vendors in a market-style venue. In most of the downtown area there is a more urban cityscape with banks, stores, markets, and malls. Sought-after goods include hand-crafted artisan pieces, such as statues, carvings, paintings, and many nature-based sculptures.

== Industry ==
All sectors of industrial production are represented in the city. The main ones include: mechanical engineering and metalworking, light industry and food processing, and the energy sector. Major industrial enterprises in Bishkek include: the Bishkek Thermal Power Plant, the "Dastan" Corporation, "Coca-Cola Bishkek Bottlers," "Bishkek-Dan-Azyk"; joint-stock companies: "Bishkeksut" dairy plant, the Bishkek Machine-Building Plant, "Kyrgyzavtomash," the "Bishkek" Reinforced Concrete Plant, and the "Zhyldyz," and "Baypak" industrial associations, among others. Industrial enterprises are located in the west and east of Bishkek. Among them are: the "Akun" flour mill, JSC "Kyrgyzmebel" furniture company, the "Shoro" national beverage producer, OJSC "Severelektro," and the Bishkek Thermal Power Plant. An incineration plant has been operating in the north of the city since 2025.

=== Housing ===
As with many cities in post-Soviet states, housing in Bishkek has undergone extensive changes since the collapse of the Soviet Union. While housing was formerly distributed to citizens in the Soviet era, housing in Bishkek has since become privatised.

Though single-family houses are slowly becoming more popular, the majority of the residents live in Soviet-era apartments. Despite the Kyrgyz economy experiencing growth, increases in available housing have been slow with very little new construction and a doubling of prices from 2001 to 2002. This changed by the 2010s when an unprecedented housing boom has transformed the city. By 2021, over 246 construction firms were active in Kyrgyzstan, primarily focusing on upscale residences, often marketed as 'business class' or 'premium class' accommodations. The southern part of the city, where a significant portion of new constructions is concentrated, faces a critical concern due to its proximity to the Issyk-Ata fault line. Compounded by the inadequately seismic-proof architecture of most of these buildings, this situation poses a serious threat to the safety of residents and has sparked criticism. Limited land availability propels private developers to encroach into socialist-era residential zones, resulting in the loss of green spaces and vital social infrastructure, including sports fields and playgrounds.

Those unable to afford the high housing price within Bishkek, notably internal migrants from rural villages and small provincial towns, often have to resort to informal squatter settlements on the city's outskirts such as Ak Jar, Ak Jol, Ak Örgö, Altyn Kazyk, Archa Beshik, Kalys-Ordo, Kayndy-2, Kelechek, Muras-Ordo and TETS-2 Yntymak. These urban settlements are estimated to house 400,000 people or about 30 percent of Bishkek's population. While many of the settlements have lacked basic necessities such as electricity and running water, recently, the local government has pushed to provide these services.

== Government ==
Former Central Committee Building

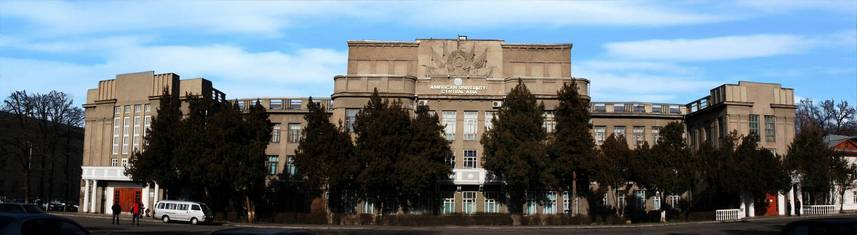
Former Supreme Soviet Building

Local government is administered by the Bishkek Mayor's Office. Askarbek Salymbekov was mayor until his resignation in August 2005, after which his deputy, Arstanbek Nogoev, took over the mayorship. Nogoev was in turn removed from his position in October 2007 through a decree of President Kurmanbek Bakiyev and replaced by businessman and former first deputy prime minister Daniar Usenov. In July 2008 former head of the Kyrgyz Railways Nariman Tuleyev was appointed mayor, who was dismissed by the interim government after 7 April 2010. From April 2010 to February 2011 Isa Omurkulov, also a former head of the Kyrgyz Railways, was an interim mayor, and from 4 February 2011 to 14 December 2013 he was re-elected the mayor of Bishkek. Kubanychbek Kulmatov was nominated for election by parliamentary group of Social Democratic Party of Kyrgyzstan in city kenesh, and he was elected as a new mayor on 15 January 2014, and stepped down on 9 February 2016. The next mayor, Albek Sabirbekovich Ibraimov, was also nominated for election by parliamentary group of Social Democratic Party of Kyrgyzstan in city kenesh, and Bishkek City Kenesh elected him on 27 February 2016. The current mayor is Emil Abdykadyrov, who was elected on 24 February 2022.

=== Administrative divisions ===
Bishkek city covers 169.6 square kilometres (65.5 square miles) and is administered separately and not part of any region. Besides the city proper, one urban-type settlement and one village are administered by the city: Chong-Aryk and Orto-Say. The city is divided into 4 districts: Birinchi May, Lenin, Oktyabr and Sverdlov. Chon-Aryk and Orto-Say are part of Lenin District.

== Culture ==
Bishkek is culturally the country's most important city. It is home to the National Library of the Kyrgyz Republic as well as a number of museums, e.g. the Kyrgyz State Historical Museum or the M. V. Frunze Museum. The national public broadcasting service KTRK or Kyrgyz Television is based in Bishkek. Newspapers in Bishkek include the English-language Bishkek Observer, the world's only dungan-language newspaper called Huimin bao and the Russian-language Vecherniy Bishkek newspaper.

=== Religion ===
The largest religion is Sunni Islam, but since many Russians live in Kyrgyzstan, there is also a large Russian Orthodox community. The Bishkek Central Mosque is one of the largest in Central Asia. Bishkek is home to the Roman Catholic Apostolic Administration of Kyrgyzstan.

=== Sports ===
Bishkek is home to Dolen Omurzakov Stadium, the largest football stadium in Kyrgyzstan and the only one eligible to host international matches. Several Bishkek-based football teams play on this pitch, including six-time Kyrgyzstan League champions, Dordoi Bishkek. Others include Alga Bishkek, Ilbirs Bishkek, and RUOR-Guardia Bishkek.

Bishkek hosted the 2014 IIHF Challenge Cup of Asia – Division I.

Bishkek Arena while hosting the 6th World Nomad Games

In August 2026, Bishkek opened the Bishkek Arena, a yurt-shaped multi-purpose stadium with a seating capacity of 51,000. Built at a cost of US$60 million, it is the largest stadium in Central Asia, meets FIFA standards, and features eight levels with retail and accessibility facilities. The arena hosted the opening ceremony of the 6th World Nomad Games.

== Education ==
Educational institutions in Bishkek include:

- Kyrgyz International University NRZ
- APAP KR
- American University of Central Asia
- Arabaev Kyrgyz State University
- Bishkek Humanities University
- International Atatürk-Alatoo University
- International University of Kyrgyzstan
- Kyrgyz International University NRZ
- Kyrgyz-Russian Slavic University
- I.K. Akhunbaev Kyrgyz State Medical Academy
- Kyrgyz State National University
- Kyrgyz Technical University
- Kyrgyz-Russian State University
- Kyrgyz-Turkish Manas University
- Kyrgyz Uzbek University
- Plato University of Management and Design
- University of Central Asia

In addition, the following international schools serve the expatriate community in Bishkek:

- European School in Central Asia
- Oxford International School Bishkek
- Hope Academy of Bishkek
- QSI International School of Bishkek
- Silk Road International School

== Transportation ==
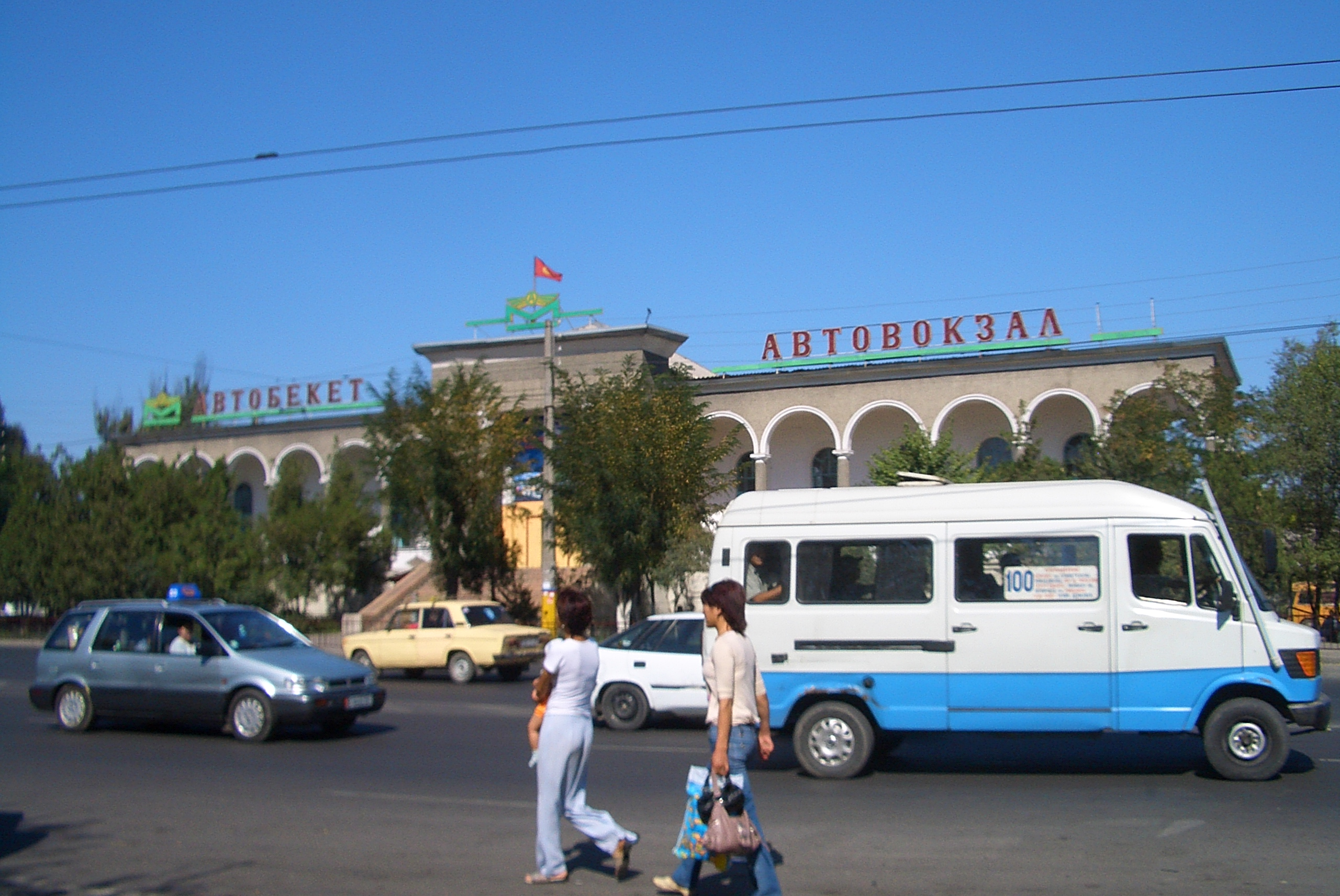
A typical Bishkek passenger van passes by the East Bus Terminal

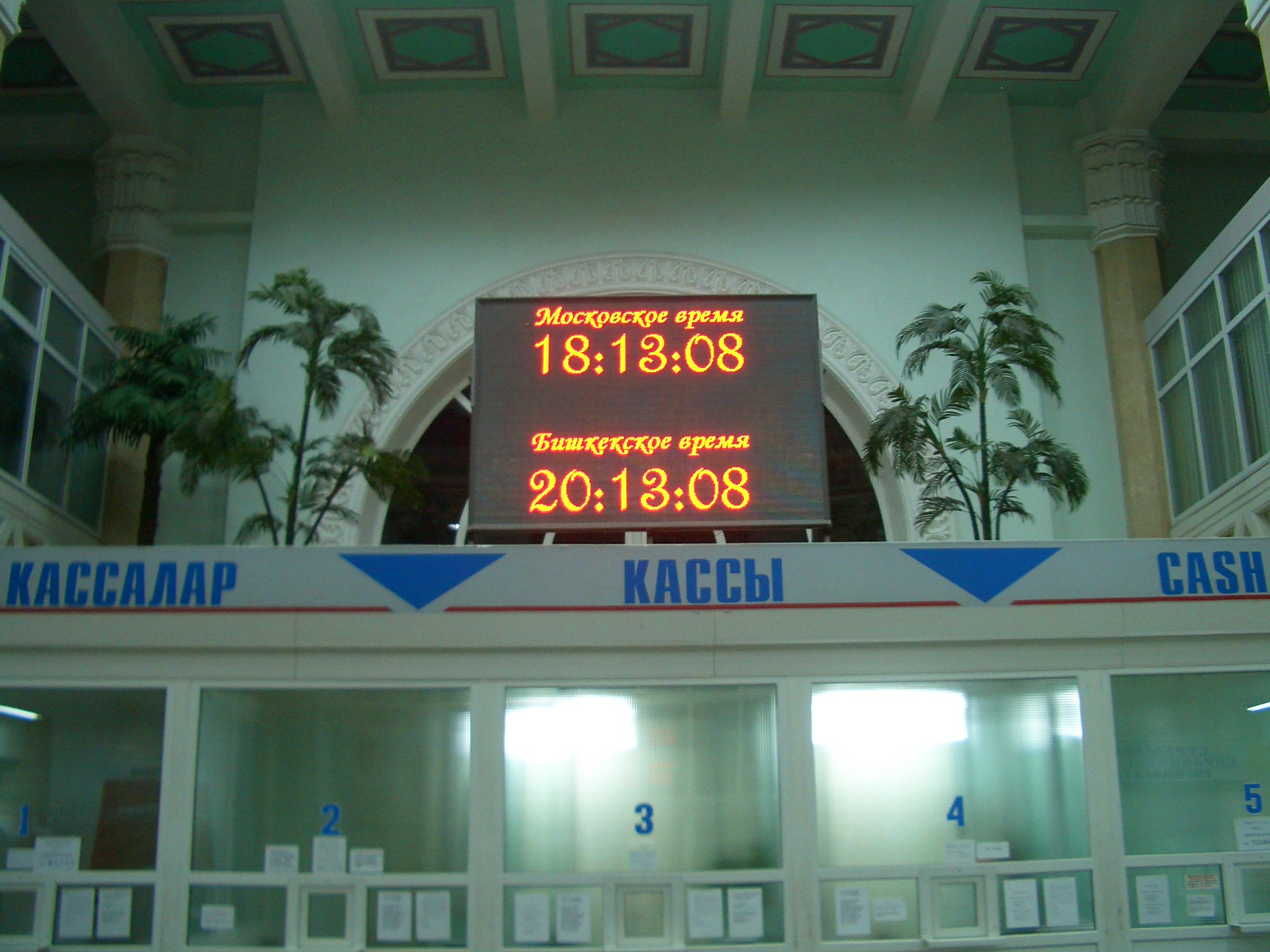
The electronic board in the main hall of Bishkek-2, the main train station, shows Bishkek and Moscow time.

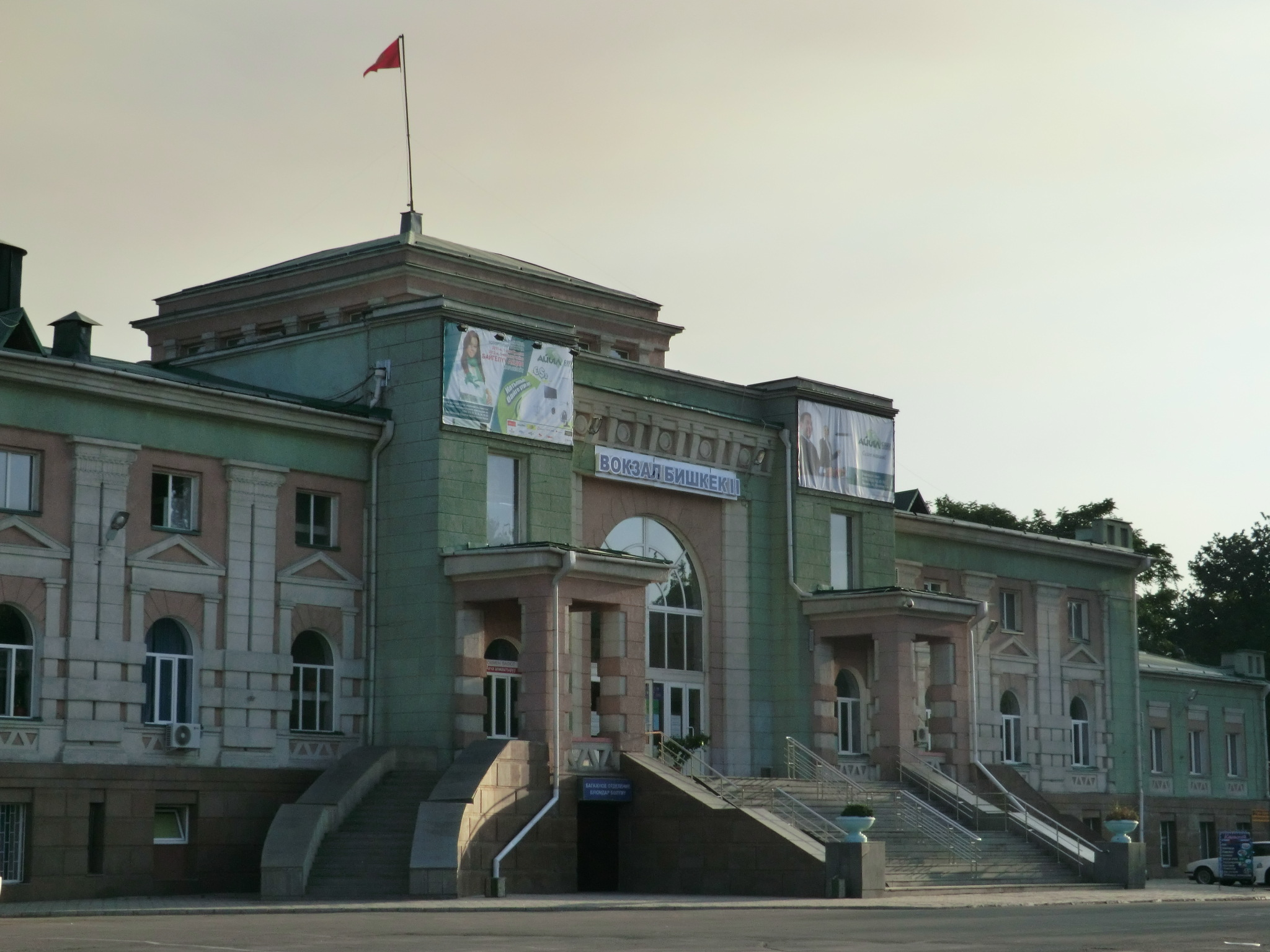
Bishkek-2 railway station

=== Mass public transport ===
Public transportation includes buses and public vans (alternatively known as minibuses or marshrutki in Russian). Trolleybuses were previously used, but were phased out in 2024. The first bus and trolleybus services in Bishkek were introduced in 1934 and 1951, respectively.

Taxi cabs can be found throughout the city.

The city is considering designing and building a light rail system.

=== Commuter and long-distance buses ===
There are two main bus stations in Bishkek. The smaller old Eastern Bus Station is primarily the terminal for minibusses to various destinations within or just beyond the eastern suburbs, such as Kant, Tokmok, Kemin, Issyk Ata, or the Korday border crossing.

Long-distance regular bus and minibus services to all parts of the country, as well as to Almaty (the largest city in neighbouring Kazakhstan) and Kashgar, China, run mostly from the newer grand Western Bus Station; only a smaller number run from the Eastern Station.

The Dordoy Bazaar on the north-eastern outskirts of the city also contains makeshift terminals for frequent minibuses and shared taxis to suburban towns in all directions (from Sokuluk in the west to Tokmok in the east), with some buses taking traders to Kazakhstan and Siberia.

=== Rail ===
As of 2026, the Bishkek-2 railway station sees only a few trains a day. It offers a popular three-day train service from Bishkek to Moscow, as well as once-daily commuter services wesbound to Kaindy and eastbound to Tokmok.

There are also long-distance trains that leave for Siberia (Novosibirsk and Novokuznetsk), via Almaty, over the TurkSib route, and to Yekaterinburg in the Urals, via Astana. These services are remarkably slow (over 48 hours to Yekaterinburg), due to long stops at the border and the indirect route (the trains first have to go west for more than a 100 kilometres (62 mi) before they enter the main TurkSib line and can continue to the east or north). For example, as of the fall of 2008, train No. 305 Bishkek-Yekaterinburg was scheduled to take 11 hours to reach the Shu junction—a distance of some 269 kilometres (167 mi) by rail, and less than half of that by road.

=== Air ===
The city is served by Manas International Airport (IATA code BSZ), located approximately 25 kilometres (16 mi) north-west of the city centre.

In 2001, the United States obtained the right to use Manas International Airport as an air base for its military operations in Afghanistan and Iraq. Russia subsequently (2003) established an airbase of its own (Kant Air Base) near Kant, some 20 kilometres (12 mi) east of Bishkek. It is based at a facility that used to be home to a major Soviet military pilot training school; one of its students, Hosni Mubarak, later became president of Egypt.

== Notable people ==
- Chinghiz Aitmatov (1928–2008), writer
- Otto Barch (1943-2025), race walker
- Sopubek Begaliev (1931–2002), economist
- Bermet Borubaeva, artist
- Altynai Botoyarova (born 2004), model
- Igor Chudinov (born 1961), politician
- Tugolbay Sydykbekov (1912–1997), writer
- Talant Dujshebaev (born 1968), handball coach and former handball player
- Mikhail Frunze (1885–1925), after whom the city was named from 1926 to 1991
- Nasirdin Isanov (1943–1991), first prime minister of Kyrgyzstan
- Kamchy Kolbayev (1974–2023), crime boss
- Sergei B. Korolev (born 1962), First Deputy Director of the Federal Security Service
- Felix Kulov (born 1948), politician
- Orzubek Nazarov (born 1966), former WBA lightweight boxing champion
- Roza Otunbayeva (born 1950), third president of Kyrgyzstan
- Vladimir Perlin (born 1942), cellist
- Denis Petrashov (born 2000), swimmer, Youth Games and Maccabiah Games medalist
- Salizhan Sharipov (born 1964), first cosmonaut of independent Kyrgyzstan
- Antonina Shevchenko (born 1984), kickboxer
- Valentina Shevchenko (born 1988), kickboxer and UFC champion
- Iasyr Shivaza (1906–1988), poet and activist
- Natalya Tsyganova (born 1971), 800m medallist at the World and European championships, representing Russia
- Daniar Usenov (born 1960), banker and politician

== Twin towns – sister cities ==
Bishkek is twinned with:

- Almaty, Kazakhstan (1994)
- Ankara, Turkey (1992)
- Ashgabat, Turkmenistan (2018)
- Colorado Springs, United States (1994)
- Doha, Qatar (2014)
- Gumi, South Korea (1991)
- İzmir, Turkey (1994)
- Kyiv, Ukraine (1997)
- Lianyungang, China (2015)
- Astana, Kazakhstan (2011)
- Qazvin, Iran (2003)
- Samsun, Turkey
- Liège, Belgium (2012)
- Shenzhen, China (2016)
- Tashkent, Uzbekistan
- Tehran, Iran (1994)
- Trabzon, Turkey (2014)
- Ufa, Russia (2017)
- Ürümqi, China (1993)
- Wuhan, China (2016)
- Yinchuan, China (2000)

== See also ==
- List of monuments of Bishkek
- Outline of Kyrgyzstan
