= Squatting in Kyrgyzstan =

During the Kirghiz Soviet Socialist Republic (1936–1991), land squatting occurred when there was insufficient housing. There was another wave of squatting when the USSR collapsed and people internally migrated to cities such as the capital Bishkek in search of employment. In the wake of the Tulip Revolution in 2005, the disturbed social order allowed squatters to occupy land, one example being the Ak Jar settlement in the Chuy Region north of Bishkek, where the squatter leaders (Kyrgyz: 'top bashylar') gave plots to their families and then sold other ones to newcomers. Other informal settlements (Kyrgyz: 'novostroyki') were called Ak-Bata, Kelechek and Nijnyaya Ala-Archa.

The new president Kurmanbek Bakiev did little to stop the occupations and therefore they continued. Coupled with weak governance, the lack of affordable housing pushed people into illegal occupation. Political leaders condemned the squatting actions, but were unable to stop them. Academics argued against the negative perceptions of squatters and NGOs such as Arysh, the Children's Protection Centre and the Red Cross supplied aid. Following the Kyrgyz Revolution of 2010, Kyrgyz nationalists attacked Mayevka, a village near Bishkek, on 19 April 19. They pillaged and claimed land from Meskhetians and Russians, then were evicted; five people were killed in the disturbances. Bakiev's residence was occupied and in the following months land owned by Uzbeks was invaded. The Bishkek Mayor's Office estimated that there were 260,000 squatters in 2012, living in 48 settlements. By 2013, Ak Jar remained an illegal settlement and continued to grow; at that point it covered 120 hectares.
