= Bishkek International School =

Non-profit community school in Kyrgyzstan

Coordinates: 42.8540°N 74.5803°E

Information
- Type: Non-profit community school
- Established: December 2010
- Teaching staff: 110
- Gender: Coeducational
- Age: 2 to 18
- Enrollment: 440
- International students: 51%
- Language: English
- Schedule: 8.00 to 15.30 or 17.30 with Extra Curricular Activities
- Campus size: 0.5 ha
- Houses: Phoenix, Piranhas, Snow Leopards
- Accreditation: IB World School; New England Association of Schools and Colleges; Cambridge Assessment International Education; Ministry of Education and Science of the Kyrgyz Republic.
- Website: http://bis.kg/

Bishkek International School logo

Bishkek International School is an international school in Bishkek founded by a group of international and local parents as a non-profit community school and legally registered as a non-profit foundation in the Kyrgyz Republic on December 1, 2010.

The first school Advisory Council meeting was held with the President of the Kyrgyz Republic, Roza Otunbaeva, on May 16, 2011 in the Ministry of Education. The school opened for students in September 2011, in a building which was built as a school but unused for this purpose for many years before being purchased by the school foundation in July 2011. Student numbers have increased from 20 students in 2011 to 440 students in 2024. The school was initially called the 'European School in Central Asia' (ESCA) and changed to 'Bishkek International School' (BIS) in 2016 to coincide with accreditation as an IB World School.

== Accreditation ==
BIS is accredited by the New England Association of Schools and Colleges (NEASC) Commission on International Education (CIE) from November 2018.

BIS is a fully authorized International Baccalaureate, IB World School, offering the IB Diploma Programme, the IB Primary Years Programme and IB Middle Years Programme. The IB Diploma is a two-year educational programme primarily aimed at students aged 16–18 that provides an internationally accepted qualification for entry into higher education and is accepted by many universities worldwide. The IB Primary Years Programme runs through Preschool and Primary School and the IB Middle Years Programme is offered in Middle School.

The school is also accredited as a Cambridge International School by Cambridge Assessment International Education and currently provides the International General Certificate of Secondary Education (IGCSE) and the International Certificate of Education Group Award.

The Government of the Kyrgyz Republic Ministry of Education and Science fully accredited BIS in May 2018 to deliver the national curriculum with examination in Grade 9 and Grade 11 for the State Certificate of Secondary Education.

== Education ==
BIS offers the IB Diploma Programme, a two-year educational programme for students aged 16–18, providing entry into many universities worldwide.

For students age 11-14 the school follows IB Middle Years Programme, then elected options for Cambridge International General Certificate of Secondary Education (IGCSE) examination at age 16. Beyond the academic curriculum, the school provides a comprehensive education program including PE, Art, Music, Drama, Dance and a wide range of extra-curricular activities.

Primary education runs from age 5 to 11, following the IB Primary Years Programme. Each class has two teachers and small class sizes. The education program includes English, Mathematics, Science, Art, Music, Drama, Physical Education, Dance, ICT, Geography, History, and Russian or Kyrgyz language as a second language option and French or Spanish or Mandarin or extra English as a third language option.

Preschool accepts children from age 2 to 5 in three classes and follows the IB Primary Years Programme from age 3.

== Students ==
BIS has around 440 students, age two to eighteen years old, representing over 30 countries. The school accepts all students regardless of ability, gender, ethnicity, language, or religious belief and everyone is encouraged to take part in all school activities. Fifty percent of students are American, Asian, African and European citizens, who are children of employees of embassies, international organizations and international business or NGOs. Fifty percent of students are Kyrgyz citizens. To ensure the international approach of the school and to enhance cultural interaction between students from many different countries of the world, school policy limits student intake from any single country to maximum 50% of all students.

== Teaching staff ==
BIS has one hundred and ten teaching staff combining international teachers with wide experience with national teachers with specialist skills and fluent English. In 2024/25, forty five international teaching staff come from the USA, UK, Japan, China, Spain, Serbia, South Africa, Zambia, Egypt, India, Pakistan, Panama, Philippines, Belgium, Colombia and Canada.

== Governance ==
BIS is an independent school with an elected Governing Board of nine members who set strategy and policy and ensure funding and sustainability as a non-profit Foundation. Board members normally serve a three-year term. Three members are elected by the Parents Association, three are elected by the school Advisory Council, and three are elected by BIS staff. All parents of students are included in the Parents Association and have an active role in the community life of the school. The Advisory Council represents permanent institutions in the Kyrgyz Republic with an interest in development of the school and education more widely in the Kyrgyz Republic. The school does not have a single Principal or Director but has a collegiate management structure with up to five members of an executive Management Board.

== Fees & Scholarships ==
BIS is a public, non-profit, foundation, ‘owned’ by the community. The school receives small donations from Founders and others but has no major benefactor for investment. All costs are funded by school fees which are set at a level to ensure sustainability. Any surplus is reinvested in the school with the objective to ultimately reduce the cost of fees to make education more accessible. The school also has a Scholarship Fund for gifted but disadvantaged children who cannot meet the school fees. Scholarships are widely advertised and available on an open competitive basis through student examination and assessment of parental wealth and income.
