= Flag of Bishkek =

Bishkek
- Use: Other
- Proportion: 2:3
- Adopted: January 14, 1994 (Note: Was adopted on the same day as the coat of arms)
- Design: The city flag is a blue cloth with the Bishkek coat of arms depicted in a white circle.

The flag of Bishkek is the official symbol of the city of republican significance Bishkek.

== Design ==
The flag of the city is a blue cloth on which the coat of arms of the city of Bishkek itself is depicted in a white circle. The coat of arms of the city of Bishkek «represents a rectangular silhouette of a fortress, where '"Bishkek" is written below under the broken line of mountains in large letters, and above it on the wall of the fortress is a light square in Kyrgyz language with "Ilbirs" (snow leopard) in the center of the circle.

== Rationale for the symbol ==
The snow leopard is an animal that lives in the rocks of the sky-high mountains, most of Ala-Too (Tian Shan). Nobility and generosity on the verge of caution have been noted in him since ancient times. In numerous legends, the snow leopard is a symbol of courage and endurance: the standard of courage for warriors. Therefore, the totem of Manas is the snow leopard. This significantly elevated symbol expresses the centuries-old way of life of the nation. Circle and square. The sun and the unity of time combined with space, the square – the four cardinal directions.

== See also ==
- Coat of arms of Bishkek
- Flag of Kyrgyzstan
