= Mayor of Bishkek =

Head of Kyrgyzstan's capital city

Mayor of the City of Bishkek
- Flag of the City Bishkek
- Incumbent; Aibek Junushaliev since 31 October 2023
- Style: Mr. Mayor
- Reports to: President of Kyrgyzstan
- Residence: Bishkek City Council
- Seat: Bishkek City Hall
- Appointer: President of Kyrgyzstan; with the Council's advice and consent
- Term length: At the President's discretion
- Inaugural holder: Akmatbek Nanaev
- Formation: 1990
- Deputy: First Vice Mayor
- Website: meria.kg

The Mayor of the City of Bishkek (Kyrgyz: Бишкек шаарынын мэри, romanised: Bishkek shaarynyn meri) is head of the executive branch of the political system of the Government of Bishkek, the capital of Kyrgyzstan. The mayor's office administers all city services, public property, police and fire protection, most public agencies, and enforces all city and state laws within Bishkek.

== Purpose ==
The mayor defines the main directions of social and economic development of the city of Bishkek, financial and economic and industrial policy, the development and implementation of citywide and targeted programs, the activities of the city halls of Bishkek. He also provides for the implementation of administrative reform, measures to develop the system of local self-government, to increase the efficiency of the work of city government bodies by improving and optimizing their structure and functions.

== Mayor's Office ==
The mayor's office includes the following staff:

- First Vice Mayor
- Vice Mayor
- Vice Mayor
- Vice Mayor
- Vice Mayor
- Head of Office, Mayor's Office of Bishkek

== List of mayors of the City of Bishkek ==
Name	Photo	Term start	Term end	Ref
Akmatbek Nanaev		1990	1991	
Abdybek Sutalinov		1991	1992	
Omurbek Abakirov		1992	1993	
Jumabek Ibraimov		January 1993	January 1995	
Boris Silayev		February 1995	April 1998	
Felix Kulov		April 1998	April 1999	
Medetbek Kerimkulov		April 1999	March 2005	
Askarbek Salymbekov		March 2005	August 18, 2005	
Arstanbek Nogoev		August 18, 2005	November 14, 2007	
Daniar Usenov		November 14, 2007	July 7, 2008	
Nariman Tuleyev		July 7, 2008	April 7, 2010	
Isa Omurkulov		April 8, 2010	December 4, 2013	
Kubanychbek Kulmatov		January 15, 2014	February 9, 2016)	
Albek Ibraimov		February 27, 2016	July 2018	
Aziz Surakmatov		August 8, 2018	October 20, 2020	
Nariman Tuleyev		October 20, 2020	October 22, 2020	
Balbak Tulobayev		October 22, 2020	August 26, 2021	
Aibek Junushaliev (Note: The surname is written Джунушалиев (Dzhunushaliev) in Russian and Жунушалиев (Junushaliev) in Kyrgyz.)		August 26, 2021	February 24, 2022	
Emilbek Abdykadyrov		February 24, 2022	October 31, 2023	
Aibek Junushaliev		October 31, 2023	present	

== Previous leaders of Bishkek ==
=== Chairpersons of the Executive Committee (1917–1991) ===
- Bayan Alamanov
- Absamat Masaliyev (1972-1974)
- October Mederov (1974-1980)
- Amangeldy Mursadykovich Muraliev (1988-1991)

=== First Secretary of the Frunze City Committee ===
The First Secretary of the Frunze City Committee of the Communist Party of Kirghizia was the paramount leader of the city.

- Ivan Ivanov (1950-1958)
- Turdakun Usubaliev (1958-1961)
- Andrey Buss (1961-1970)
- Kenesh Kulmatov (1970-1973)
- Karybek Moldobaev (1973-1985)
- Ulukbek Chinaliev (1985-1990)

== See also ==
- Timeline of Bishkek
