= Bishkek Observer =

- Type: Weekly newspaper
- Language: English
- Headquarters: Bishkek

Bishkek Observer is an English-language weekly newspaper published in Bishkek, Kyrgyzstan.

== History and profile ==
The Bishkek Observer is based in Bishkek and is a weekly newspaper published in English language. The paper has both international and local editions.
