= Hope Academy of Bishkek =

International school in Bishkek, Kyrgyzstan

Coordinates: 42°52′37.2″N 74°37′18.1″E

Hope Academy of Bishkek (HAB) is an international primary and secondary school in Bishkek, Kyrgyzstan. It was founded in 1998 by a group of expatriate parents and provides an English language education, primarily for children of expatriate volunteer families in Kyrgyzstan.

== Demographics ==
Hope Academy has approximately 167 students from preschool through 12th grade, representing 22 nationalities. The largest single student group is from South Korea. The staff come from approximately 15 countries. The largest single group is from Kyrgyzstan, followed by the United States.

== Academics ==
The school offers the following subjects for grades 1-12: Language Arts, Kyrgyz History and Culture, Math, Social Studies, Science, Ethics, Russian, Korean, ESL, Physical Education, Art, Music, Library, and Computer Skills. The average class size is about 14 students per grade.

At the Secondary School Level, HAB offers a college preparatory program, preparing students for the IGCSE and AP exams.

== Extracurricular activities ==
Hope Academy takes part in the Central Asian Basketball Classic, the Central Asian Soccer Classic, and the Central Asian Smash Bros Ultimate Classic. It has annual dramatic productions, service projects, and clubs.

== Accreditation ==
Hope Academy is accredited with the New England Association of Schools and Colleges (NEASC) through the Commission on International Schools Abroad (CAISA). Hope Academy is a member of the Association of Christian Schools International (ACSI).
