= Bishkek-2 railway station =

Railway station in Bishkek, Kyrgyzstan

Bishkek-2
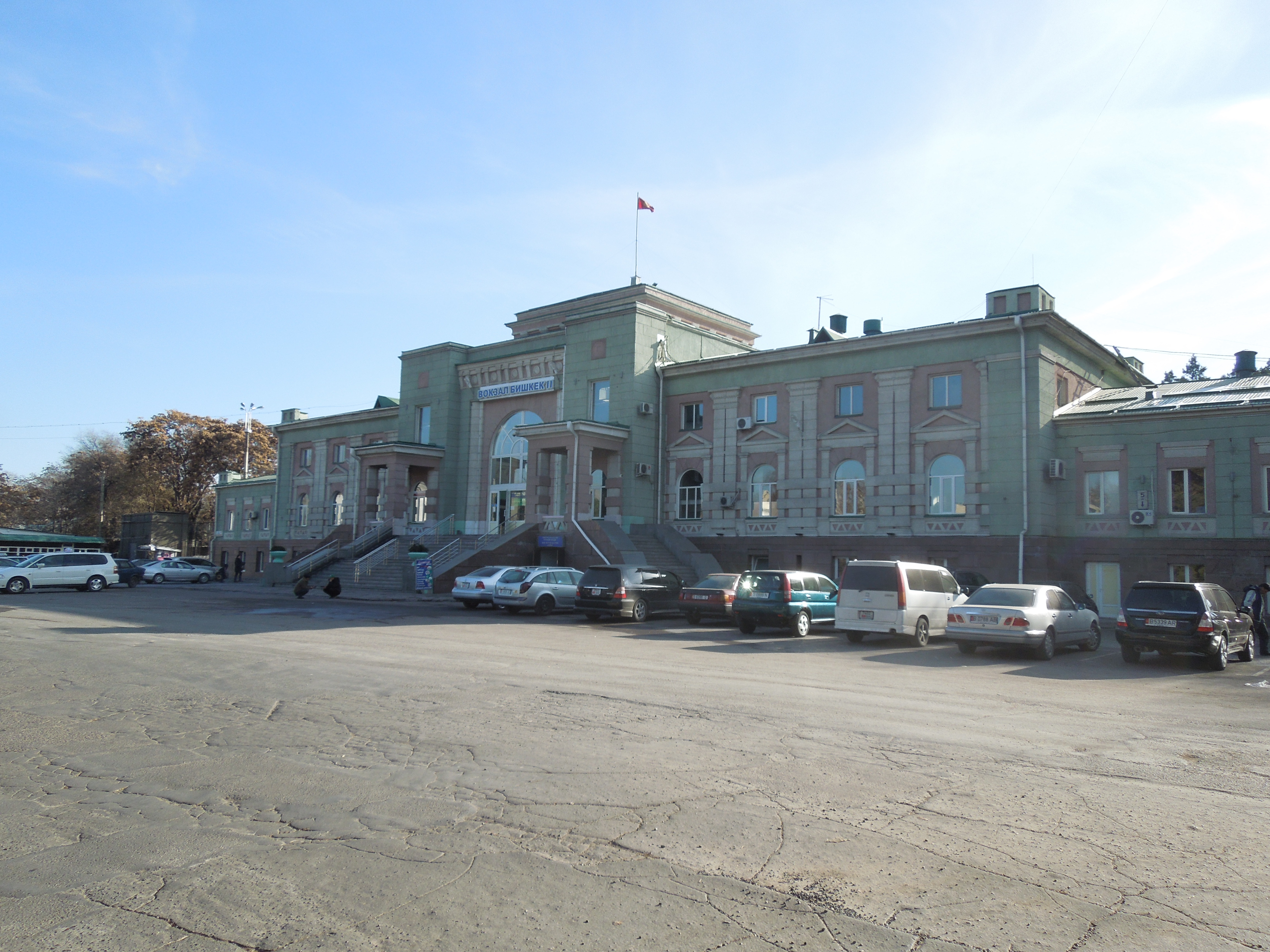

General information
- Location: Bishkek; Kyrgyzstan
- Coordinates: 42°54′N 74°38′E
- System: Kyrgyz Railways
- Owner: Kyrgyz Railways

Construction
- Parking: Yes

History
- Opened: 1938
Location

Bishkek-2 (Kyrgyz: Бишкек 2) is a train station located in the center of Bishkek, Kyrgyzstan. Design and construction of the building began in the 1930s. The work was completed in two years. May 1, 1938 the station was opened. Bishkek-1 railway station is located in the western part of the city, while this station is located in the city center.

== Trains ==
- Bishkek — Moscow
- Bishkek — Novokuznetsk
- Bishkek — Shu

== See also ==
- Kyrgyz Railways
- Bishkek-1 railway station
