= M. V. Frunze Museum =

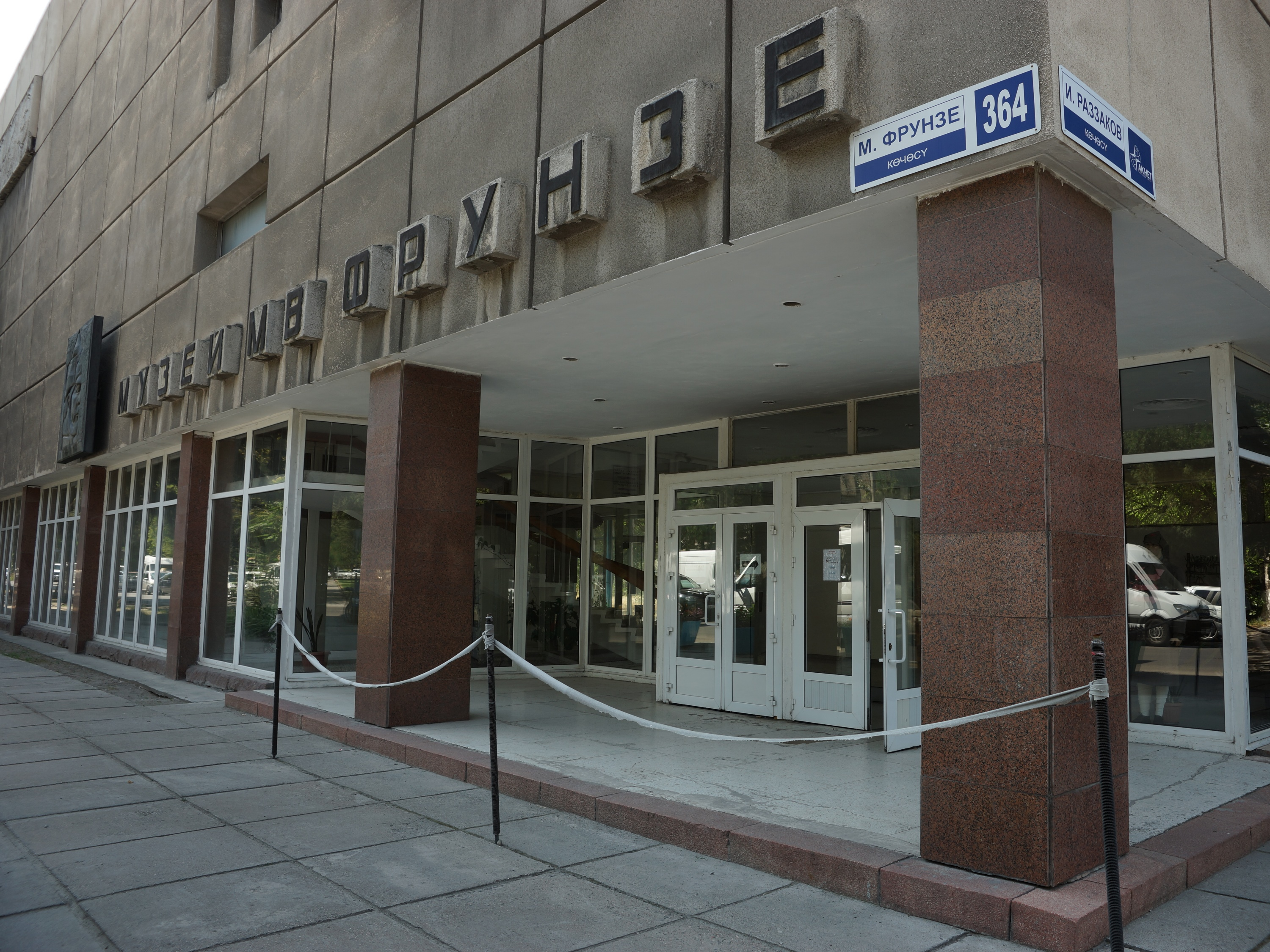
- Established: December 9, 1925; 99 years ago
- Location: Bishkek, Kyrgyzstan
- Coordinates: 42.880469°N 74.605442°E
- Type: Memorial Museum
- Website: www.domfrunze.kg

The M. V. Frunze Museum (Kyrgyz: М. В. Фрунзенин Үй-музейи) is a museum located in the capital of Kyrgyzstan, Bishkek. The museum is dedicated to exhibiting artifacts of Mikhail Frunze.

== History ==
The museum opened for the first time in December 1925, the aim with the creation of the museum was to commemorate Mikhail Frunze in the house where he was born, this house was built in 1879 by Vasily Frunze, Mikhail's father. In 1967, the museum was renovated after the anniversary of the October Revolution, the muralists Alexei Kamensky and Alexander Voronin participated in the decoration of the building. In 2002, the building was added to the State List of Historic and Cultural Monuments of Republican Importance. In 2014, three exhibits were stolen from the museum, including the banner of the 46th regiment of the Red Army. In April 2019, Du Dewen, the ambassador of China to Kyrgyzstan visited the museum. Also in 2019, jewelry from the museum were stolen.

== Collections ==
In 2001, the museum contained about 6583 objects. Some of these artifacts were donated by Mikhail's family or friends, including furniture and plates. One of the main exhibits of the museum was an adobe hut. The museum contains books, manuscripts, documents, photographs and paintings. In 2018, an exhibition about the development of Bishkek with photographs was organized in the museum, which was attended by Aigul Ryskulova, Vice Mayor of Bishkek at that time. In 2019, the museum presented an exhibition about Epic of Manas, in this exhibition documents, photographs and illustrations were shown. In February 2021, the museum organized the exhibition "Frunze Week" where it presented personal belongings of Mikhail Frunze. In April 2021, the museum presented an exhibition with old books dating from the late 19th and early 20th century.
