= List of Kyrgyz Heroes of the Soviet Union =

This is a list of people awarded the title Hero of the Soviet Union who were of Kyrgyz ethnicity. It does not include non-Kyrgyz residents of the Kyrgyz SSR who were awarded the title.

- Jumash Asanaliev ru
- Dair Asanov
- Kazak Jarkimbaev ru
- Samat Sadykov ru
- Tokubai Taigaraev ru
- Ismailbek Taranchiev
- Mamasaly Teshebaev ru
- Cholponbai Tuleberdiev ru
- Kalynur Usenbekov ru
- Anvarbek Chortekov ru
- Duyshenkul Shopokov ru
- Osman Yakubov ru
