= Nariman Tuleyev =

Kyrgyz railway developer and politician

Nariman Tuleyev (Kyrgyz: Нариман Түлеев, romanized: Nariman Tüleyev) is a Kyrgyz railway developer and politician.

He is the CEO of the Kyrgyz Railway (KTJ) and in 2008 announced that work will commence on the electrification of the line which connects the capital Bishkek with the Kazakhstan railway network.

Tuleyev is former Mayor of Bishkek.
