= Askarbek Salymbekov =

Kyrgyzstani politician

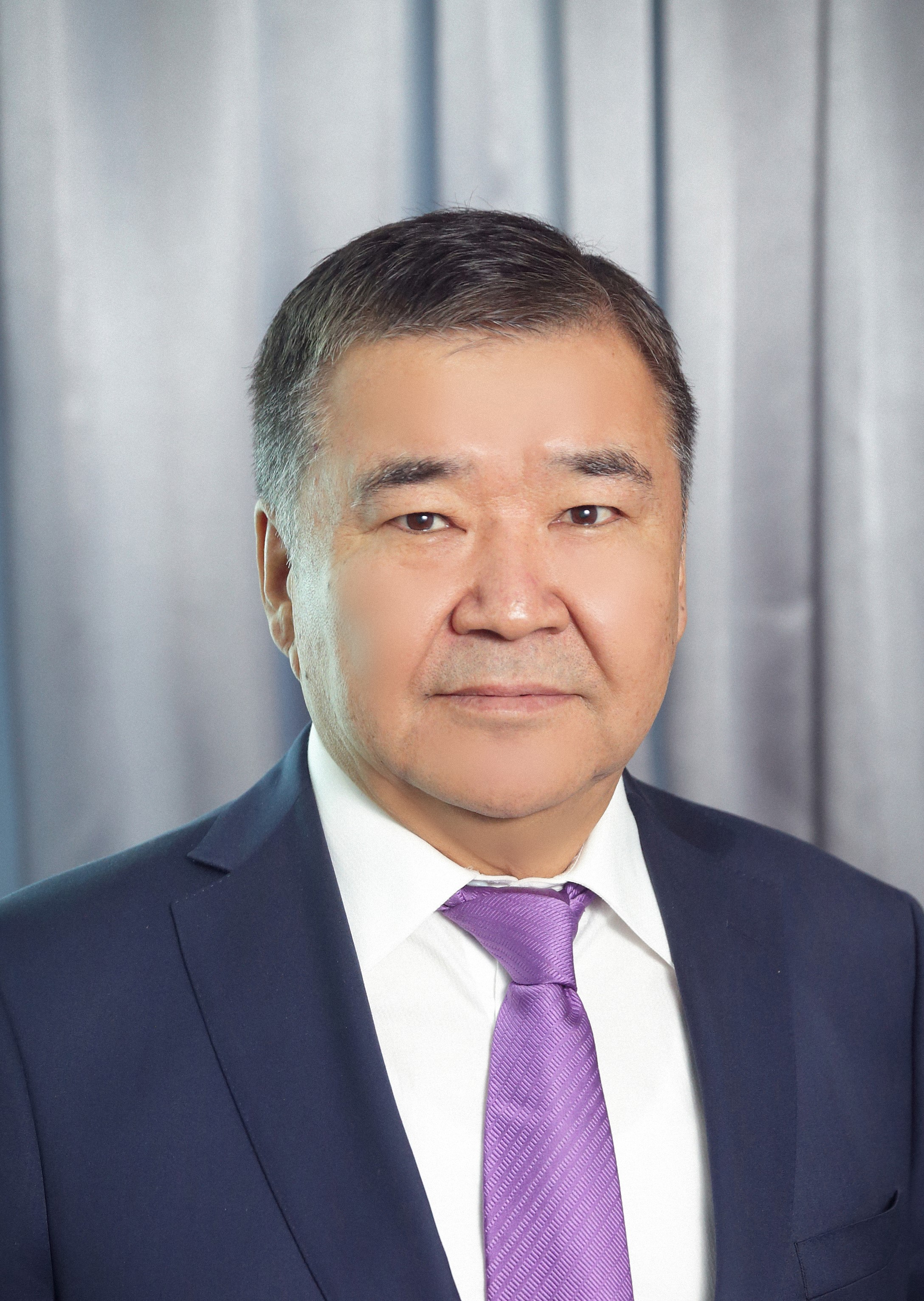
Askarbek Salymbekov

Askarbek Salymbekov is a Kyrgyz politician. He was a former mayor of the capital Bishkek and withdrew his candidacy for another term in 2005. He was replaced on August 18, 2005, by Arstanbek Nogoev who was voted to become the capital's new mayor by a vote of 37 for and 3 against.
