= Aibek Junushaliev =

Kyrgyz politician, Mayor of Bishkek

Aibek Dzhunushaliev
- Айбек Жунушалиев

Mayor of Bishkek
- Incumbent
- Assumed office 31 October 2023
- President: Sadyr Japarov
- Preceded by: Emilbek Abdykadyrov
- In office 12 August 2021 – 24 February 2022
- President: Sadyr Japarov
- Preceded by: Taalaibek Sarybashov (acting)
- Succeeded by: Emilbek Abdykadyrov

Personal details
- Born: 6 July 1976 (age 50)

Aibek Junushaliev (Kyrgyz: Жунушалиев, romanized: Junushaliev; Russian: Джунушалиев, romanized: Dzhunushaliev) is a Kyrgyz politician. He was born in Kegeti in the Chüy District. He graduated in 1999 from Kyrgyz National University (Kyrgyz: Кыргыз улуттук университети; Russian: Кыргызский национальный университет) (Note: In 1999 Kyrgyz National University was named Kyrgyz State National University.) with a degree in law.

He has served as Mayor of Bishkek since 31 October 2023. He was previously mayor from 26 August 2021 to 24 February 2022.

== Political career ==
He was nominated by Prime Minister Ulukbek Maripov and the majority coalitio and was elected by the Bishkek City Council with 43 of 45 votes on 26 August 2021; he had been serving as acting mayor since 12 August. He replaced acting mayor Taalaibek Sarybashov, who had stepped down to run for a seat in parliament. He resigned in February 2022. After his first term he lead the Presidential Administration's Department for monitoring the implementation of decisions of the President and the Cabinet of Ministers, and in June 2022 Japarov appointed him head of its Department for Preparation of Decisions of the President and the Cabinet of Ministers.

Japarov named Dzhunushaliev mayor again by decree on 31 October 2023. He replaced Abdykadyrov.During his second term he represented the city abroad, signing a "road map of cooperation" with the Government of Belarus in September 2024.
