= Bishkek Central Mosque =

Mosque in Bishkek, Kyrgyzstan

- Kyrgyz: Бишкек борбордук мечити Russian: Центральная мечеть Бишкека
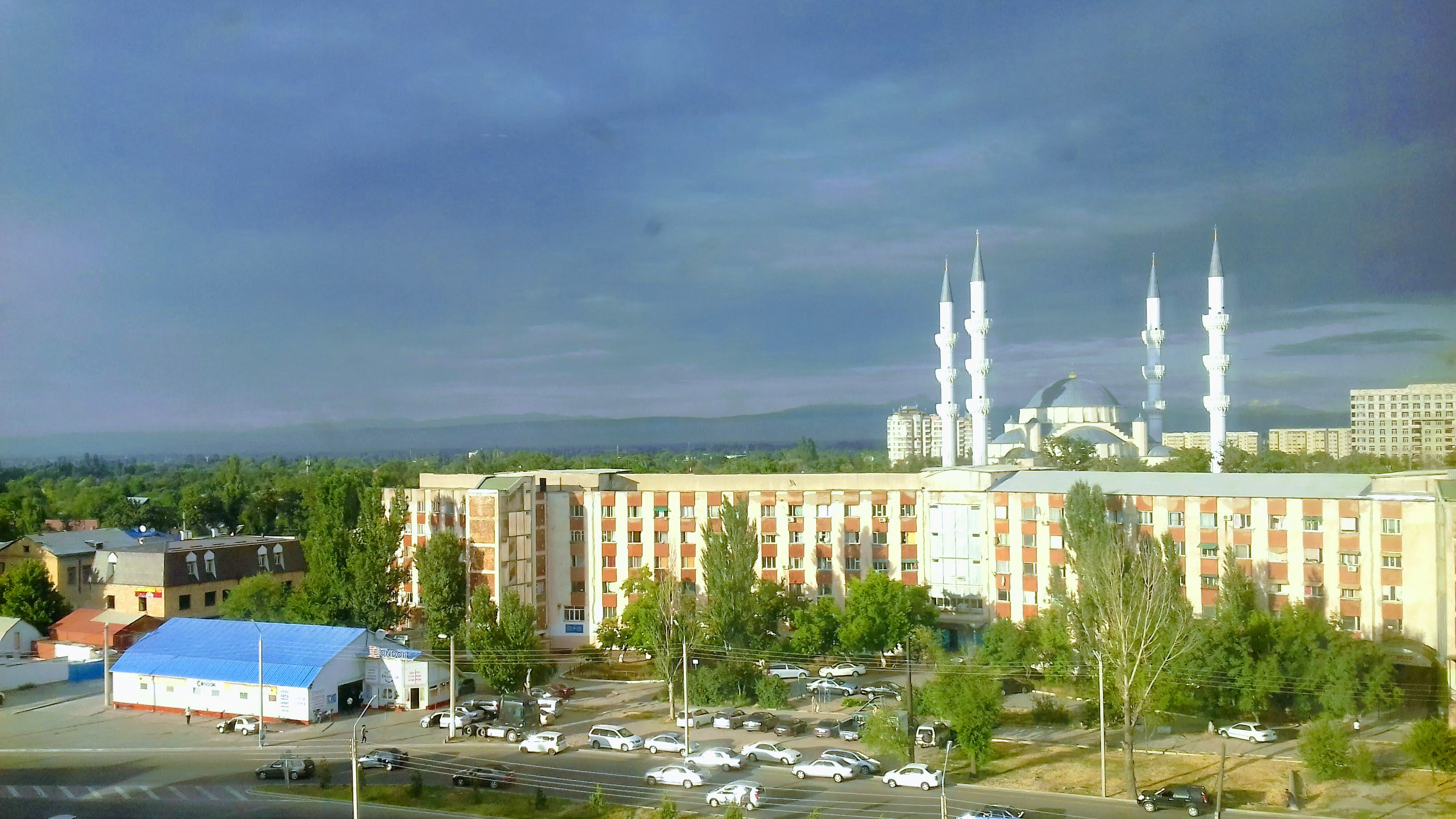
- The mosque as seen in 2017.

- Location within Kyrgyzstan

Religion
- Affiliation: Islam

Location
- Location: Bishkek, Kyrgyzstan
- Interactive map of Bishkek Central Mosque
- Coordinates: 42.8836°N 74.6201°E

Architecture
- Type: mosque
- Funded by: Diyanet
- Established: 2 September 2018
- Groundbreaking: 2012
- Minaret: 4

Interior

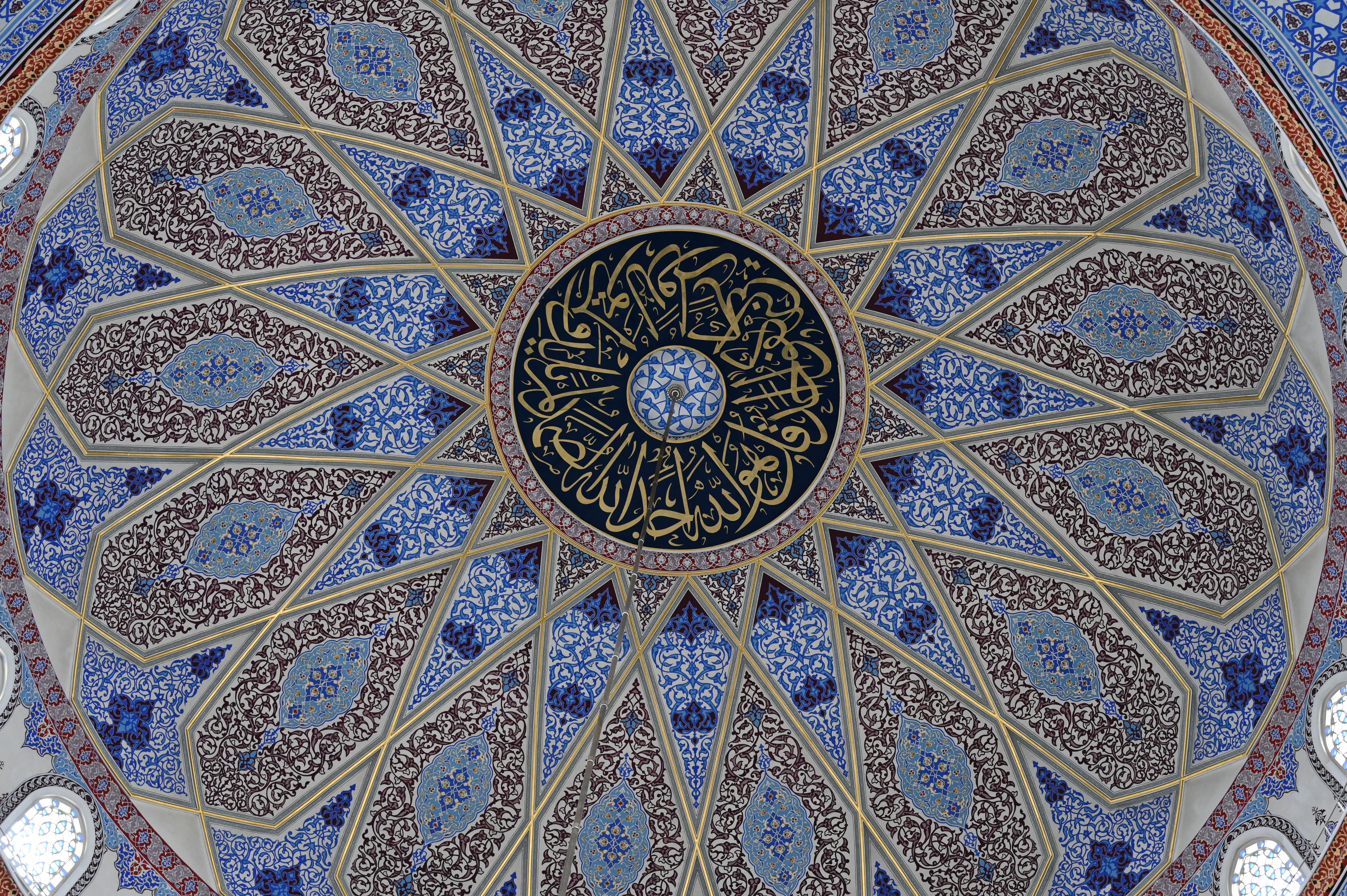
Main dome of Bishkek Central Mosque, viewed from floor

The Central Mosque of Imam Sarakhsi, commonly known as the Bishkek Central Mosque (Kyrgyz: Бишкек борбордук мечити, romanized: Bişkek borborduk meçiti, Russian: Центральная мечеть Бишкека, romanized: Tsentral'naya mechet' Bishkeka) is a mosque in Bishkek, Kyrgyzstan.

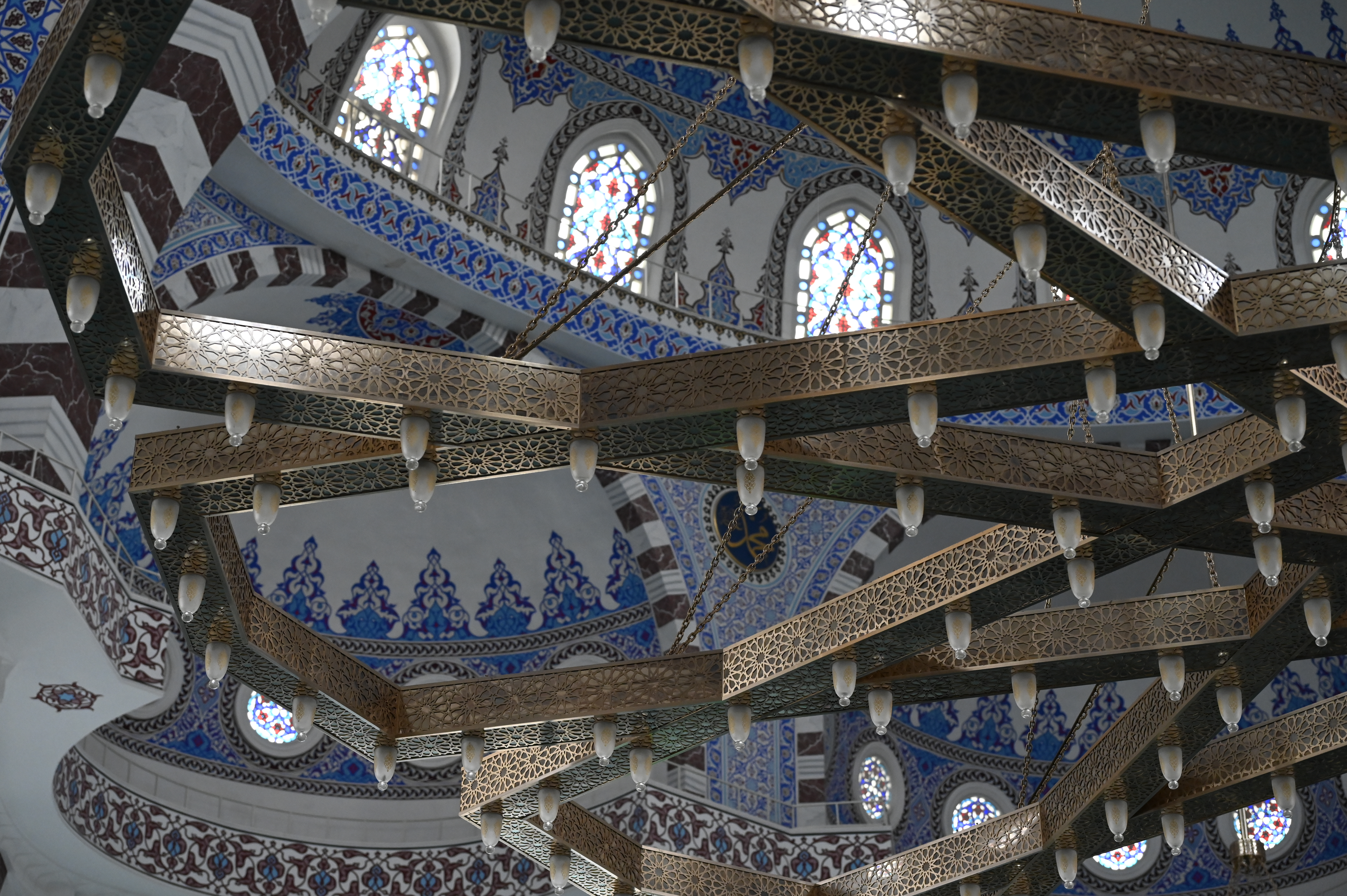
Detail, Chandelier hanging from Central Mosque dome

The construction of the mosque started in 2012 and it was inaugurated in 2018. It was funded by the Turkish Diyanet. It is one of several mosques funded by Turkey across the world. Built in an Ottoman revival style, the mosque is one of the largest in Central Asia. It has the capacity to accommodate 30,000 worshipers.

== History ==
Construction of the mosque started in 2012. It was later decided that the mosque would be named after Al-Sarakhsi, a medieval Islamic scholar.

The mosque was inaugurated on 2 September 2018. The opening ceremony was attended by Kyrgyz President Sooronbai Jeenbekov and his Turkish counterpart Recep Tayyip Erdogan.

== Architecture ==
Bishkek Central Mosque illuminated at night

The mosque is built in an Ottoman revival style, with four minarets, each with three balconies. It resembles the Kocatepe Mosque in design. The mosque has a capacity of 9000 people in the closed space, and 30,000 people overall.

== See also ==
- Islam in Kyrgyzstan
