= Osh Bazaar =

Market in Bishkek, Kyrgyzstan

Coordinates: 42.875°N 74.570°E

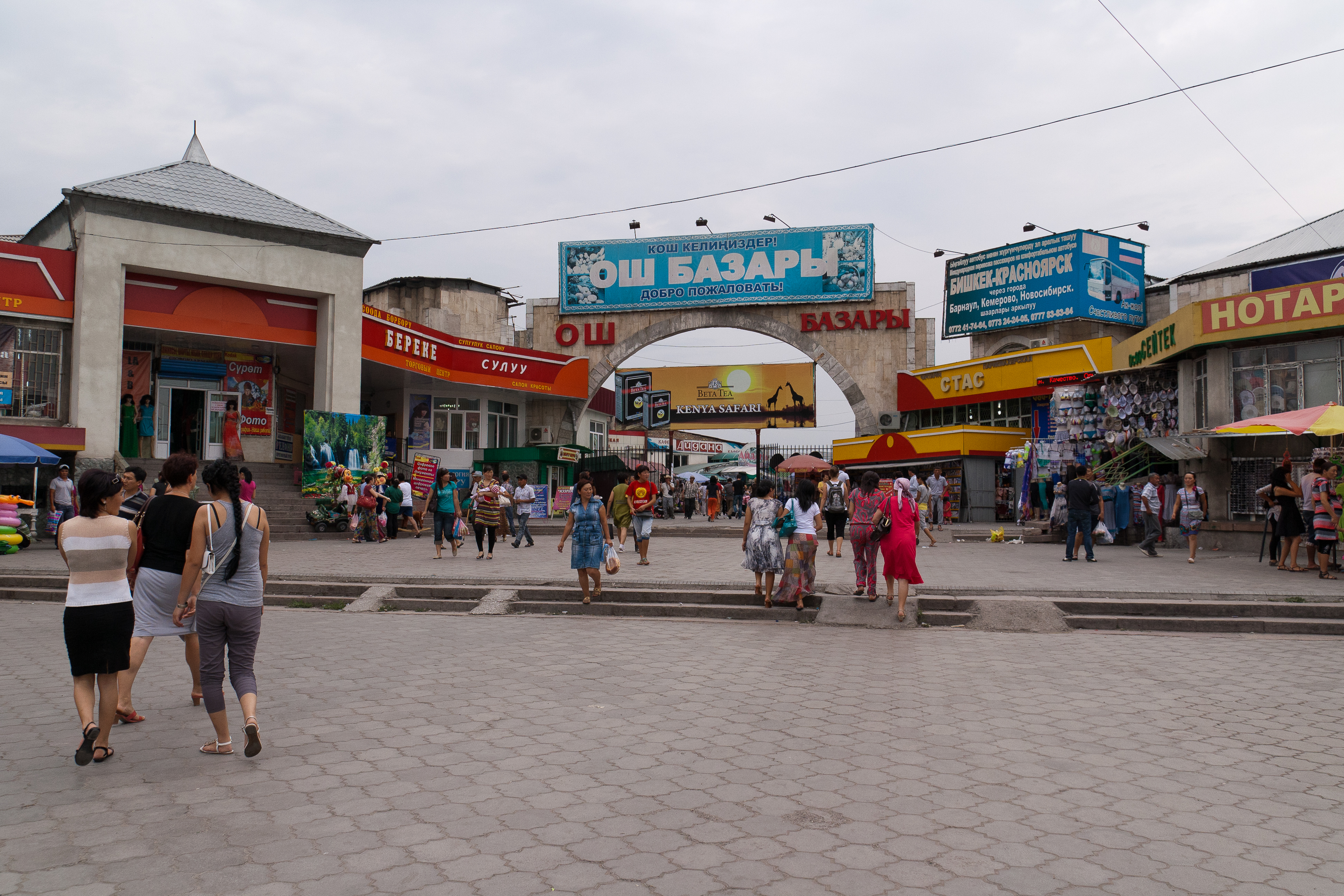
One of the main entrances of Osh Bazaar

Osh Bazaar (Kyrgyz: Ош базары [oʃ bɑzɑrɯ]) is one of the largest bazaars in Bishkek, Kyrgyzstan. It is located on the west side of the city, and is not far from the Western Bus Station. Osh Bazaar in Bishkek was created in 1983, at the same time as other bazaars in other Kyrgyz cities.

At Osh Bazaar, one can buy food products, almost any common household good, clothes, souvenirs, and even musical instruments. Kyrgyz national clothes are sold in the national goods section, called "Kyyal" (Kyrgyz: Кыял - "fantasy/dream"), and may be special ordered (for size, colour, etc.) through the bazaar vendors. The national goods section also includes vendors who sell carved wooden trunks (Kyrgyz: сандык), national bedding (Kyrgyz: төшөк), national cradles (Kyrgyz: бешик), small souvenirs, and many other locally produced items relevant to the traditional and modern culture of Kyrgyzstan.

== See also ==
- Bazaar
- Dordoy Bazaar
