= Daniar Usenov =

Kyrgyz banker and politician

- Данияр Үсөнов

13th Prime Minister of Kyrgyzstan
- In office 21 October 2009 – 7 April 2010
- President: Kurmanbek Bakiyev
- Preceded by: Igor Chudinov
- Succeeded by: Almazbek Atambayev

Personal details
- Born: 9 March 1960 (age 66) Frunze, Kirghiz SSR, Soviet Union
- Education: Frunze Polytechnic Institute
- Profession: Mining engineer

Daniar Toktogulovich Usenov (Kyrgyz: Данияр Токтогулович Үсөнов, romanized: Daniyar Toktogulovich Üsönov; Russian: Данияр Токтогулович Усенов) is a Kyrgyz banker and politician who served as the Prime Minister of Kyrgyzstan from October 2009 to April 2010. He previously served as Mayor of Bishkek.

== Background ==
Born in Frunze (now Bishkek) in 1960, Usenov was graduated from the Frunze Polytechnics Institute in 1982. Following two years of military service, he worked as a mining engineer before entering politics in 1990.

His political career has involved positions in the Kara-Balta city administration, Chuy Oblast state administration, and (in 1995–2000) the national Legislative Assembly. In early 1999, Usenov declared opposition to policies of President Askar Akayev. His company Eridan faced numerous tax inspections that forced him declare bankruptcy. Usenov was also barred from running for parliament in early 2000. On 10 May 2006, under President Kurmanbek Bakiyev, he began serving as Deputy Prime Minister for Economic Affairs. In early 2007 Usenov was appointed as chairman of the top Kyrgyz bank Ineximbank, which is involved in building a cement factory and developing numerous real estate projects in Kyrgyzstan and Kazakhstan. On 10 October 2007, he was appointed by President Bakiyev to replace Arstanbek Nogoev as Mayor of Bishkek.

== 2010 Kyrgyz rioting ==
During the 2010 Kyrgyzstan uprising, the political opposition led by the Social Democratic Party of Kyrgyzstan seized control of Bishkek, the Kyrgyz capital. After President Kurmanbek Bakiyev reportedly fled the capital in a private airplane, opposition leader Temir Sariyev announced on the radio that Prime Minister Usenov had resigned after negotiations with Social Democratic Party leaders.

== Post-2010 ==
In August 2020, a photo showed Belarusian President Alexander Lukashenko standing with Usenov in Minsk, over which the Foreign Ministry of Kyrgyzstan protested to the Belarusian embassy in Bishkek. He reportedly went under the name of Daniil Timuravich Uritskiy.

Political offices
Preceded by Igor Chudinov	Prime Minister of Kyrgyzstan; 2009–2010	Succeeded by Almazbek Atambayev
