= Kyrgyz Railways =

Railway operator in Kyrgyzstan

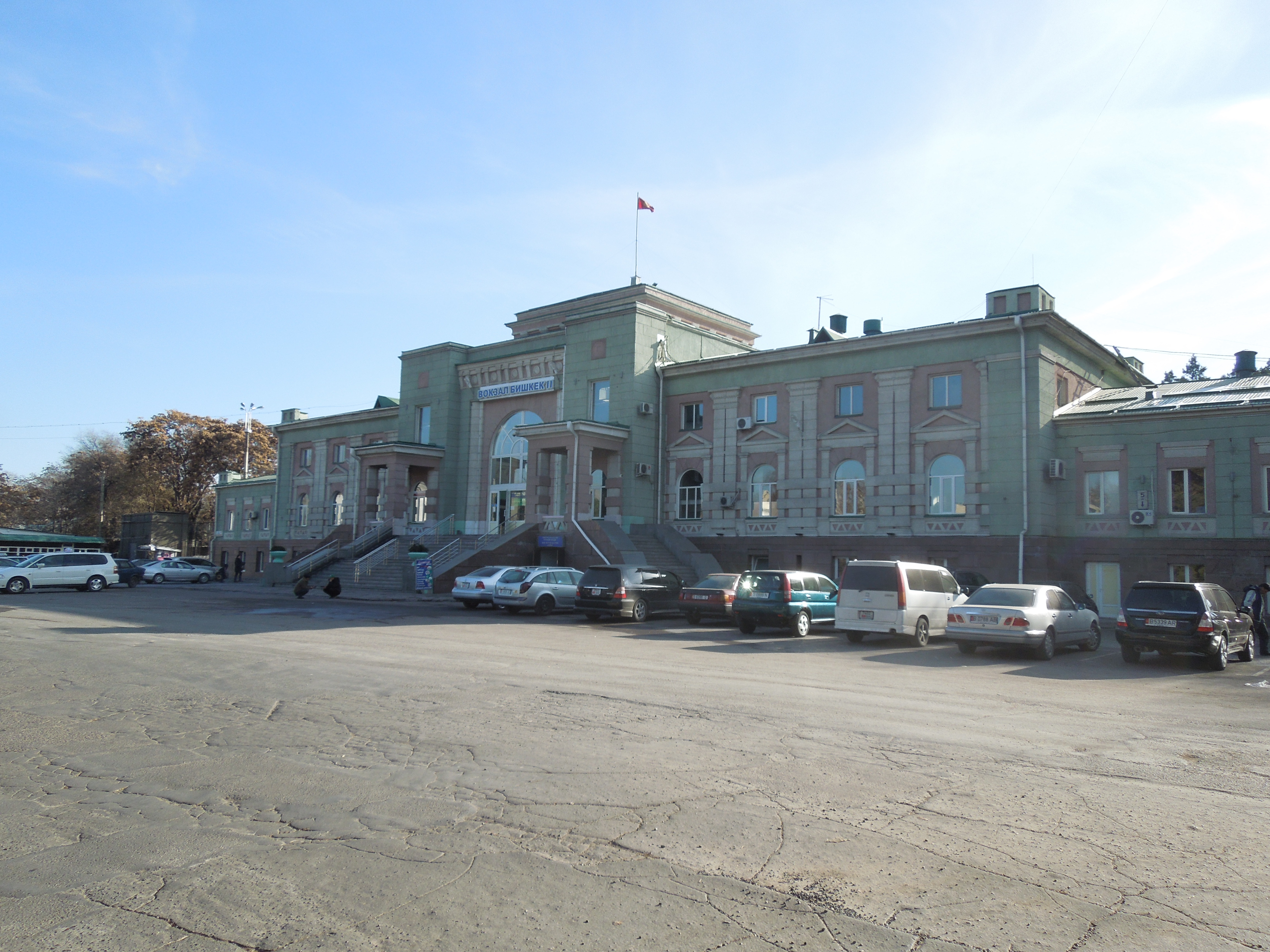
Bishkek-2 railway station

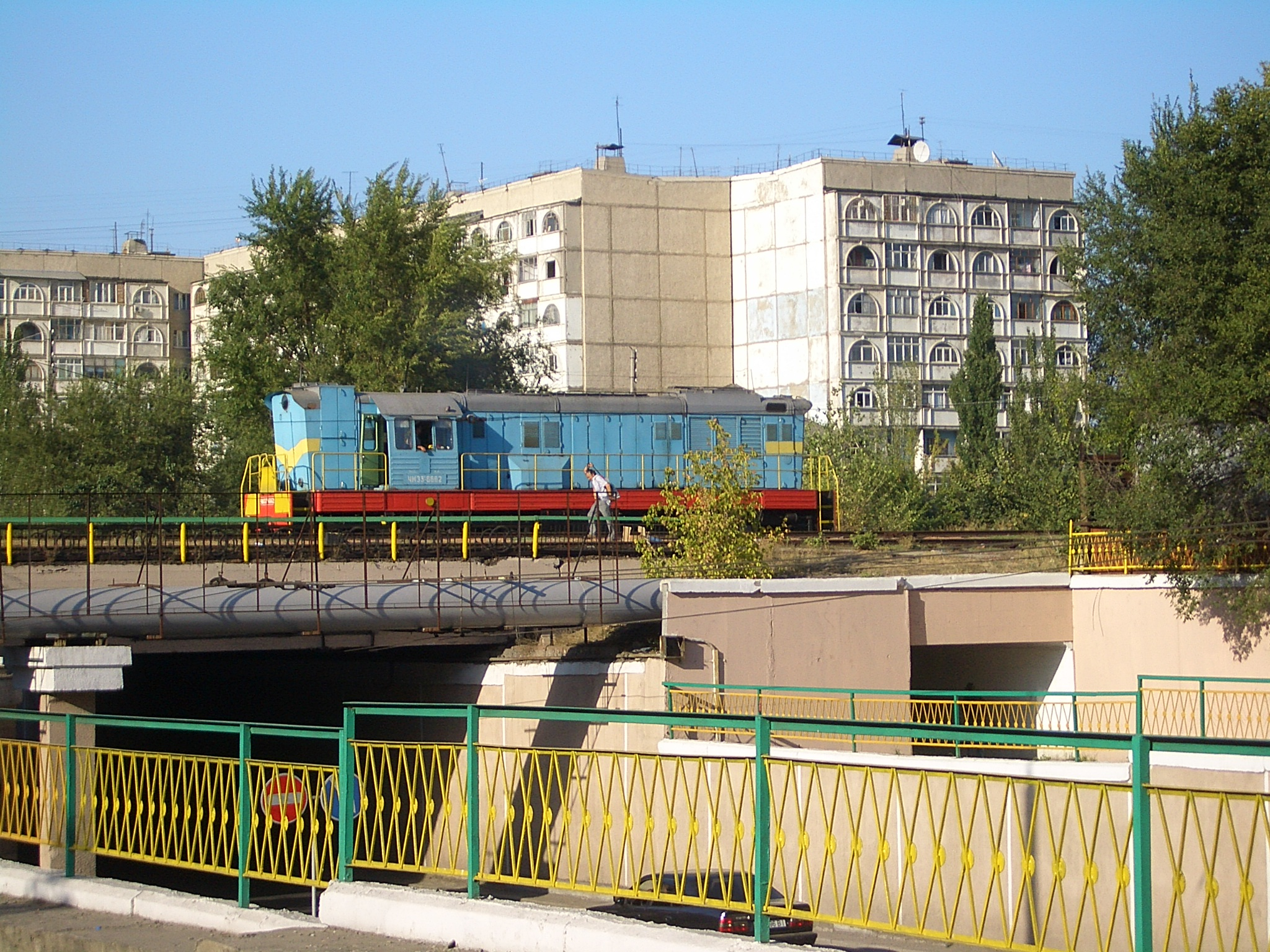
A diesel locomotive on an overpass in Bishkek

Kyrgyz Railways (KTJ; Kyrgyz: Кыргыз темир жолу) is the national railway developer of Kyrgyzstan.

== Track network and rolling stock ==
Kyrgyz Railway operates about 320 km of single track lines (with a total track length of 424 km). After the Soviet Union broke up, Kyrgyz Railways obtained 2,500 freight cars, 450 passenger cars and 50 locomotives from the Soviet railways. However, the 1998 financial crisis drastically reduced spending on the railways.

The current rail network is based on the inheritance from the former Soviet Union and as such has a broad gauge of 1,520 mm (4 ft 11 27/32 in).

== Traffic ==
Freight traffic is now only 13% of its 1990 level, 330 million tkm in 2001, compared to 2,620 million tkm in 1990 and is still falling. Passenger traffic is only about 25% of what it was in 1990. While freight services are profitable, passenger services are losing money, since fares are regulated by the Antimonopoly Regulation Service, and travel is, due to long distances and slow railways, partly taken over by air travel. Also, the line which once linked Bishkek and Osh became untenable once the complex post-Soviet borders in the Fergana Valley became less permeable in the later 1990s: the 'domestic' route had looped around through Tashkent (Uzbekistan) and Khujand (Tajikistan) crossing newly internationalized frontiers nine times.

== Electrification ==
In 2008 it was announced that work will commence on the electrification of the line which connects the capital Bishkek with the Kazakhstan railway network. As of 2021, work has not begun yet.

== Projects ==
The China–Kyrgyzstan–Uzbekistan railway, which started construction in 2025, aims to build 260 km of new track in Kyrgyzstan, connecting it to both Kashgar, China and Andijan, Uzbekistan.

== Rail links with adjacent countries ==
- Kazakhstan - yes - Bishkek branch - same gauge
- Uzbekistan - yes - Osh branch - same gauge
- Tajikistan - no - same gauge
- China - no - Break of gauge 1,520 mm (4 ft 11 27/32 in)/1,435 mm (4 ft 8 1/2 in)

== See also ==
- Transport in Kyrgyzstan
