= Arstanbek Nogoev =

Kyrgyz politician (born 1951)

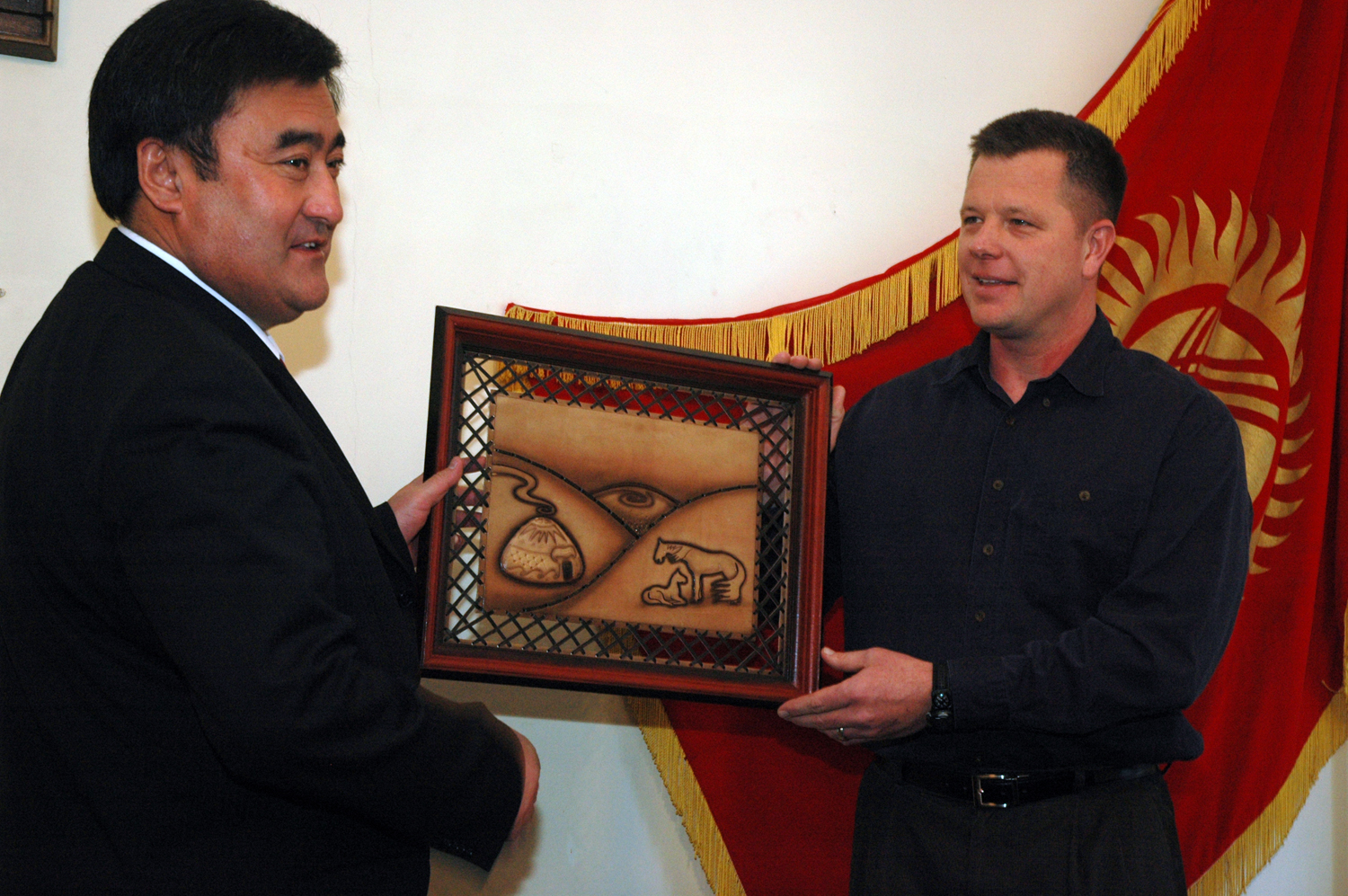
Nogoev in March 2007

Arstanbek Imankulovich Nogoev (born 10 June 1951) was the Mayor of Bishkek, Kyrgyzstan from 18 August 2005 to 10 October 2007. He graduated from the Frunze Polytechnic Institute in 1974, where he studied in the Faculty of Technology and published several monographs on the topic of agriculture. In the 1980s, he rose through the ranks of the Communist Party, earning him a place at the Tashkent Higher Party School, where he studied between 1986 and 1986. He went on to serve as head of Kemin District between 1999 and 2003, and then became deputy mayor under Askarbek Salymbekov. After Salymbekov's resignation, Nogoev ran unopposed for the mayorship and was appointed through a vote of the city council, with 37 supporters and 3 opposers. He was removed from his position in October 2007 through a decree of President Kurmanbek Bakiyev and replaced by businessman and former first deputy prime minister Daniar Usenov.

Nogoev is married, with five sons and two daughters.
