= Kyrgyzstan =

Country in Central Asia

Kyrgyz Republic: Кыргыз Республикасы (Kyrgyz); Кыргызская Республика (Russian)
- Flag Emblem
- Anthem: Кыргыз Республикасынын Мамлекеттик гимни (Kyrgyz); Kyrgyz Respublikasynyn Mamlekettik gimni "State Anthem of the Kyrgyz Republic"
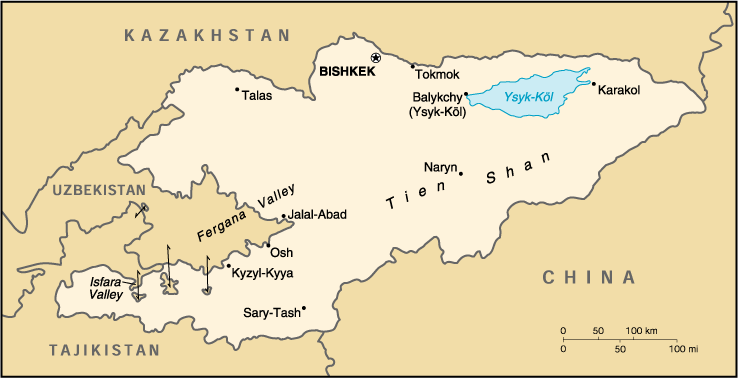
- Capital and largest city: Bishkek; 42°52′N 74°36′E
- Official languages: Kyrgyz (state) Russian (official)
- Common languages: Uzbek
- Official script: Cyrillic
- Ethnic groups (2026): 77.8% Kyrgyz; 14.3% Uzbeks; 3.7% Russians; 1.0% Dungans; 0.9% Tajiks; 2.3% Others
- Religion (2026): 91% Islam; 8% Christianity; 1% Others
- Demonym: Kyrgyz • Kyrgyzstani
- Government: Unitary presidential republic
  - President: Sadyr Japarov
  - Prime Minister: Adylbek Kasymaliev
  - Speaker: Marlen Mamataliev
- Legislature: Supreme Council

Formation
  - Kyrgyz Khaganate: 840
  - Kara-Kyrgyz Khanate: 1842–1867
  - Annexed by the Russian Empire: 1876
  - Kara-Kirghiz AO: 14 October 1924
  - Kirghiz ASSR: 11 February 1926
  - Kirghiz SSR: 5 December 1936
  - Sovereignty declared: 30 December 1990
  - Independence declared from USSR: 31 August 1991
  - Independence recognized: 26 December 1991
  - Current constitution: 11 April 2021

Area
  - Total: 200,105 km^{2} (77,261 sq mi) (85th)
  - Water: 7,198 km^{2} (2,779 sq mi)
  - Water (%): 3.6

Population
  - 2026 estimate: ▲7.5 million (107th)
  - Density: 37/km^{2} (95.8/sq mi) (109th)
- GDP (PPP): 2025 estimate
  - Total: ▲$64.110 billion (128th)
  - Per capita: ▲$8,870 (136th)
- GDP (nominal): 2025 estimate
  - Total: ▲$22.587 billion (126th)
  - Per capita: ▲$2,930 (139th)
- Gini (2022): ▼26.4 low inequality
- HDI (2023): ▲0.720 high (117th)
- Currency: Kyrgyzstani som (c) (KGS)
- Time zone: UTC+6 (KGT)
- Date format: dd/mm/yyyy
- Calling code: +996
- ISO 3166 code: KG
- Internet TLD: .kg

Kyrgyzstan, (Note: /ˌkɜːr.ɡɪˈstæn, ˈkɪər.ɡɪˌstɑːn/ KUR-gih-STAHN, KEER-, Kyrgyz: Кыргызстан, romanized: Kyrgyzstan, pronounced [qɯrʁɯːˈstɑn]; Russian: Кыргызстан, romanized: Kyrgyzstan, pronounced [kɨrɡɨˈstan].) officially the Kyrgyz Republic, formerly known as Kirghizia, (Note: Since 5 May 1993.: Kyrgyz: Кыргыз Республикасы, romanized: Kyrgyz Respublikasy; Russian: Кыргызская Республика, romanized: Kyrgyzskaya Respublika.) is a landlocked country located in Central Asia, lying in the Tian Shan and Pamir mountain ranges. It is bordered by Kazakhstan to the north, Uzbekistan to the west, Tajikistan to the south, and China to the east and southeast. The capital and largest city is Bishkek which lies on the northern border with Kazakhstan. Ethnic Kyrgyz make up the majority of the 7.5 million people, followed by significant minorities of Uzbeks and Russians.

Kyrgyzstan's history spans a variety of cultures and empires. Although geographically isolated by its highly mountainous terrain, Kyrgyzstan has been at the crossroads of several civilizations as part of the Silk Road along with other commercial routes. Inhabited by a succession of tribes and clans, Kyrgyzstan has periodically fallen under larger domination, e.g., the Turkic nomads who trace their ancestry to many Turkic states. It was first established as the Yenisei Kyrgyz Khaganate. In the 13th century it was conquered by the Mongol Empire and under several Mongol dynasties; it regained independence but was invaded by the Dzungar Khanate. After the Dzungar genocide by the Qing dynasty, Kyrgyz and Kipchaks were an integral part of the Kokand Khanate.

In 1876, Kyrgyzstan became part of the Russian Empire, and in 1936 the Kirghiz Soviet Socialist Republic was formed to become a constituent republic of the Soviet Union. Following Mikhail Gorbachev's democratic reforms in the USSR, in 1990 pro-independence candidate Askar Akayev was elected president. On 31 August 1991, Kyrgyzstan declared independence from the USSR, and a democratic government was established. Kyrgyzstan attained sovereignty as a nation state after the breakup of the Soviet Union in 1991.

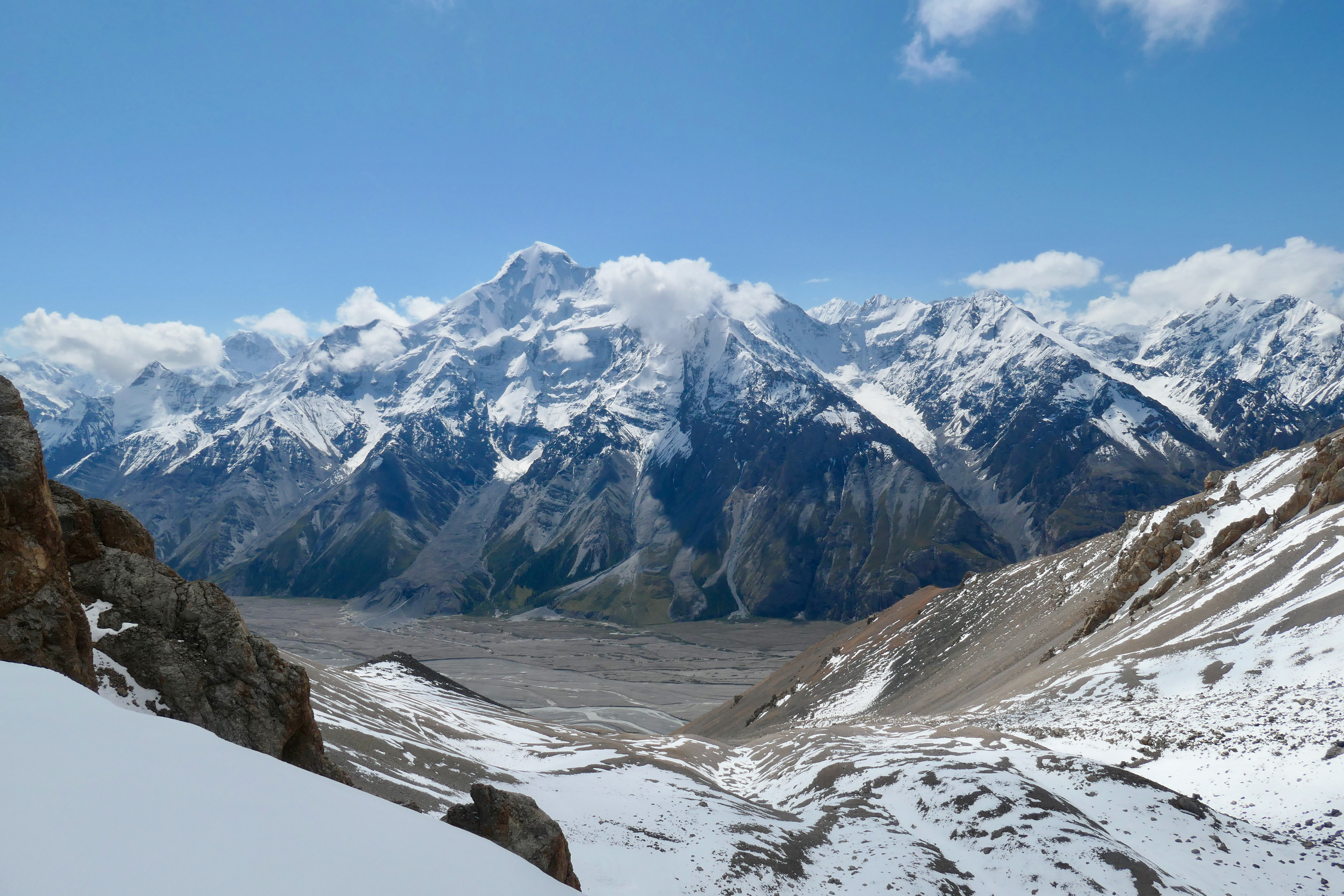
Tian Shan Mountains in East Kyrgyzstan

After independence, Kyrgyzstan was officially a unitary presidential republic. Following the Tulip Revolution it became a unitary parliamentary republic; however, it gradually developed an executive president and was governed as a semi-presidential republic before reverting to a presidential system in 2021. Throughout its existence, the country has continued to endure ethnic conflicts, revolts, economic troubles, transitional governments and political conflict.

Kyrgyzstan is a member of the Commonwealth of Independent States, the Eurasian Economic Union, the Collective Security Treaty Organization, the Shanghai Cooperation Organisation, the Organisation of Islamic Cooperation, the Organization for Security and Cooperation in Europe, the Organization of Turkic States, the Türksoy community, and the United Nations. It is a developing country ranked 117th in the Human Development Index. The transition economy relies mainly on re-exporting Chinese goods and gold production. The country balances its international trade commitments as a World Trade Organization member since 1998 with regional integration through the Eurasian Economic Union, which it joined in 2015, and a delegation of parliamentarians sit at the Parliamentary Assembly of the Council of Europe.

== Etymology ==
There are many theories about the origin of the word Kyrgyz. One proposed etymology is that it means "forty tribes", which may refer to the 40 clans of Manas, a legendary hero who united regional clans. The Persian suffix -Stan means "place of".

The 40-ray sun on the flag of Kyrgyzstan is a reference to those same 40 tribes and the graphical element in the sun's center depicts the wooden crown, called tunduk, of a yurt—a portable dwelling traditionally used by nomads in the steppes of Central Asia.

The official name is Kyrgyz Republic, used in international arenas and foreign relations. In the English-speaking world, the spelling Kyrgyzstan is commonly used, while its former name Kirghizia (Note: Russian: Киргизия, romanized: Kirgiziya, pronounced [kʲɪrˈɡʲizʲɪjə].) is rarely used.

== History ==
=== Early history ===
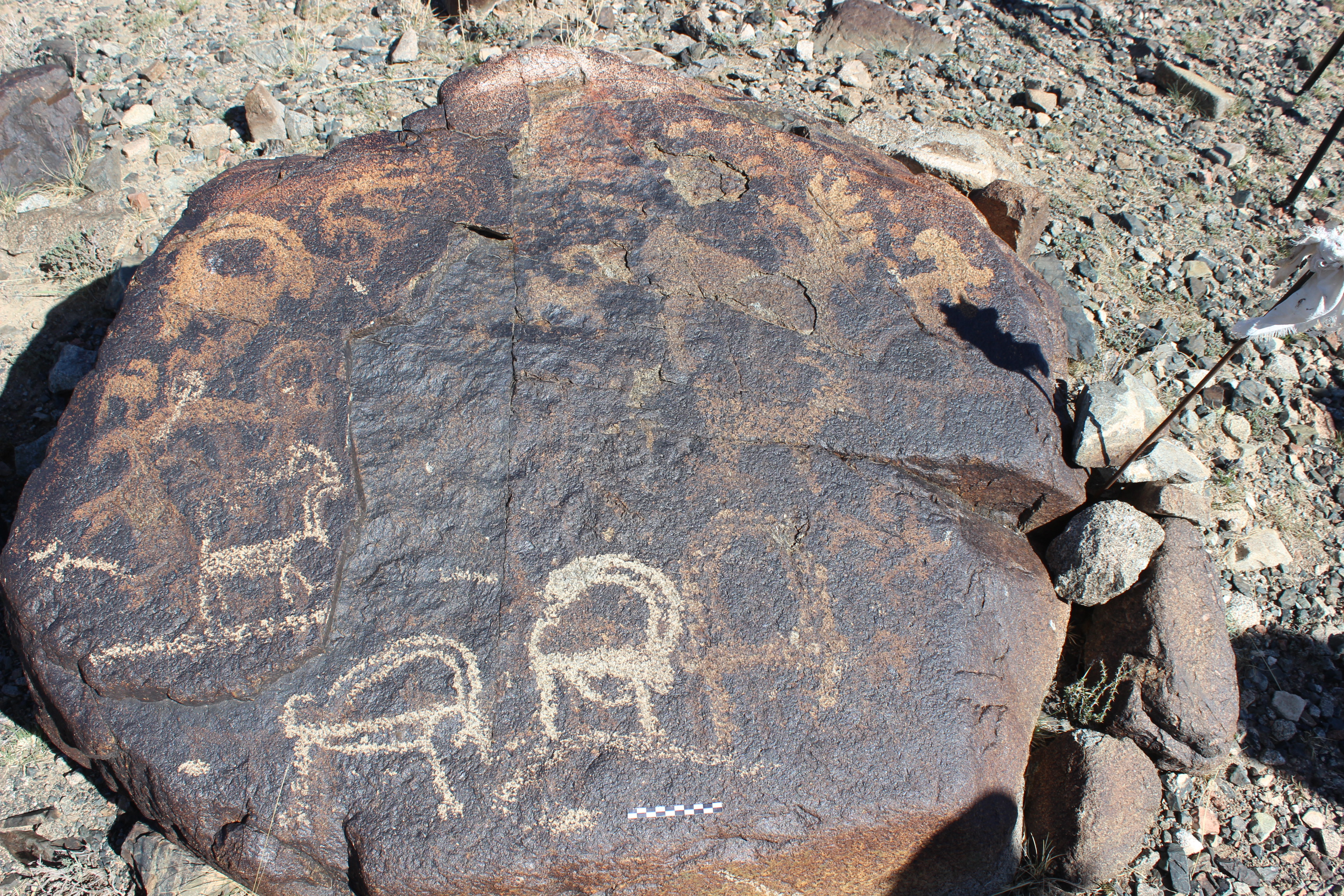
Petroglyphs of local sheep, Sary Kamysh

The Kyrgyz state reached its greatest expansion after defeating the Uyghur Khaganate in 840 AD. From the 10th century, the Kyrgyz migrated as far as the Tian Shan range and maintained their dominance over the territory for about 200 years.

There is a storytelling tradition of the Epic of Manas, which involves a warrior who unified all of the scattered tribes into a single nation in the 9th century. The trilogy, an element of the UNESCO Intangible Cultural Heritage List, expresses the memory of the nomadic Kyrgyz people.

In the 12th century, the Kyrgyz dominion had shrunk to the Altay range and Sayan Mountains as a result of the Mongol expansion. With the rise of the Mongol Empire in the 13th century, the Kyrgyz migrated south. The Kyrgyz peacefully became a part of the Mongol Empire in 1207. Issyk-Kul Lake was a stopover on the Silk Road, a land route for traders, merchants, and other travelers from the Far East to Europe.

Kyrgyz tribes were overrun in the 17th century by the Mongols, in the mid-18th century by the Manchu-led Qing dynasty of China, and in the early 19th century by the Uzbek Khanate of Kokand. In 1842, the Kyrgyz tribes broke away from Kokand and united into the Kara-Kyrgyz Khanate, led by Ormon Khan. Following Ormon's death in 1854, the khanate disintegrated.

=== Russian conquest ===
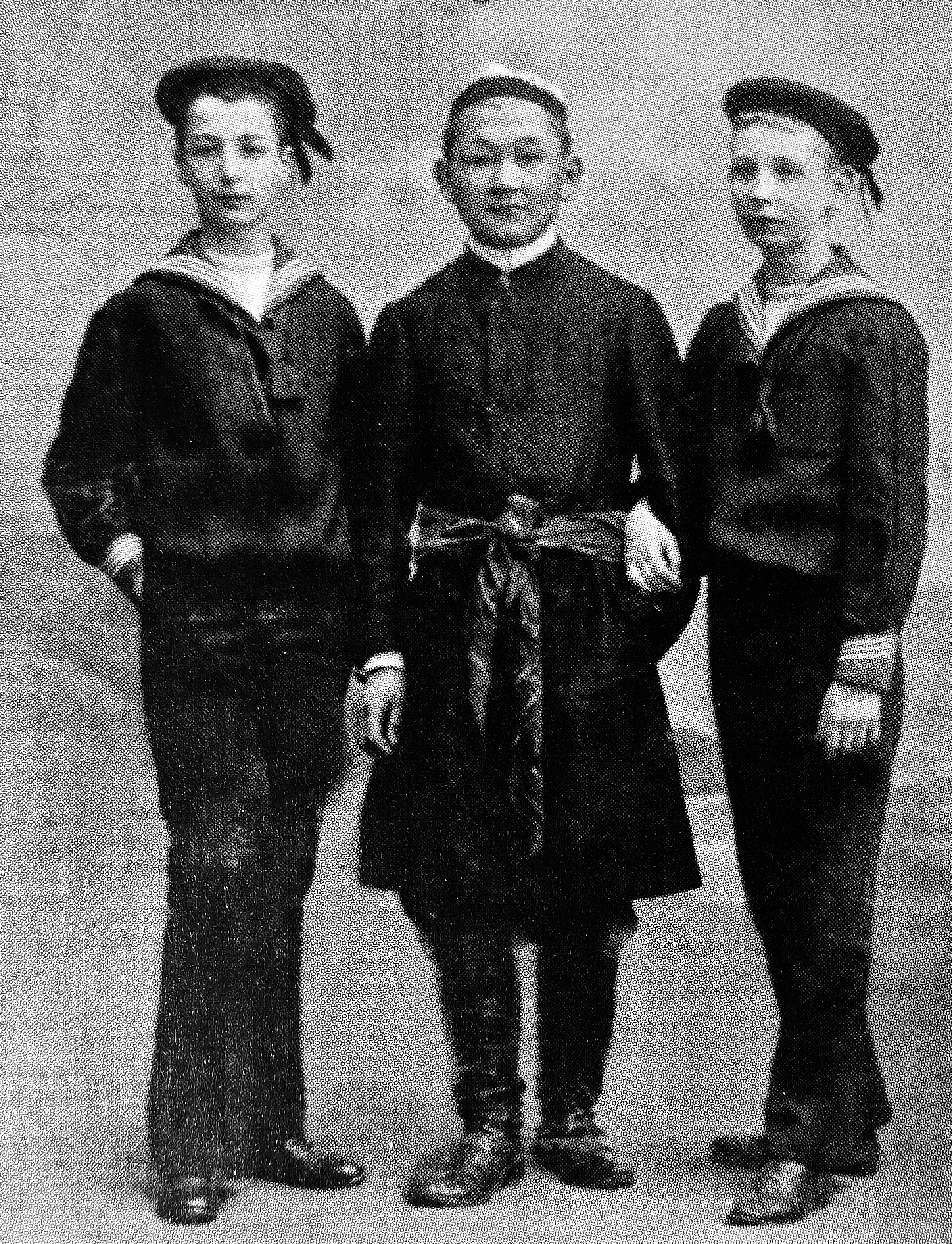
Turgan Berdike-úlu, first Kyrgyz traveler to Europe - 1906

In the late 19th century, much of the Issyk-Kul Region was ceded to the Russian Empire by Qing China through the Treaty of Tarbagatai. The territory, known in Russian as "Kirghizia", was formally incorporated into the Russian Empire in 1876. The Russian takeover was met with numerous revolts, and many of the Kyrgyz opted to relocate to the Pamir Mountains and Afghanistan.

The suppression of the 1916 rebellion against Russian rule in Central Asia caused many Kyrgyz to migrate to China. Since many ethnic groups in the region were, and still are, split between neighboring states at a time when borders were more porous and less regulated, it was common to move back and forth over the mountains, depending on where life was perceived as better; this might mean better rains for pasture or better government during oppression.

=== Soviet Kyrgyzstan ===
Soviet power was initially established in the region in 1919, and the Kara-Kyrgyz Autonomous Oblast was created within the Russian Soviet Federative Socialist Republic. The phrase Kara-Kirghiz was used until the mid-1920s by the Russians to distinguish them from the Kazakhs, who were also referred to as Kirghiz. On 5 December 1936, the Kirghiz Soviet Socialist Republic was established as a constituent Union Republic of the Soviet Union. (Note: The Kirghiz Soviet Socialist Republic was initially part of the Russian Soviet Federative Socialist Republic as the Kirghiz Autonomous Socialist Soviet Republic before being elevated to a full Union Republic on 5 December 1936.)

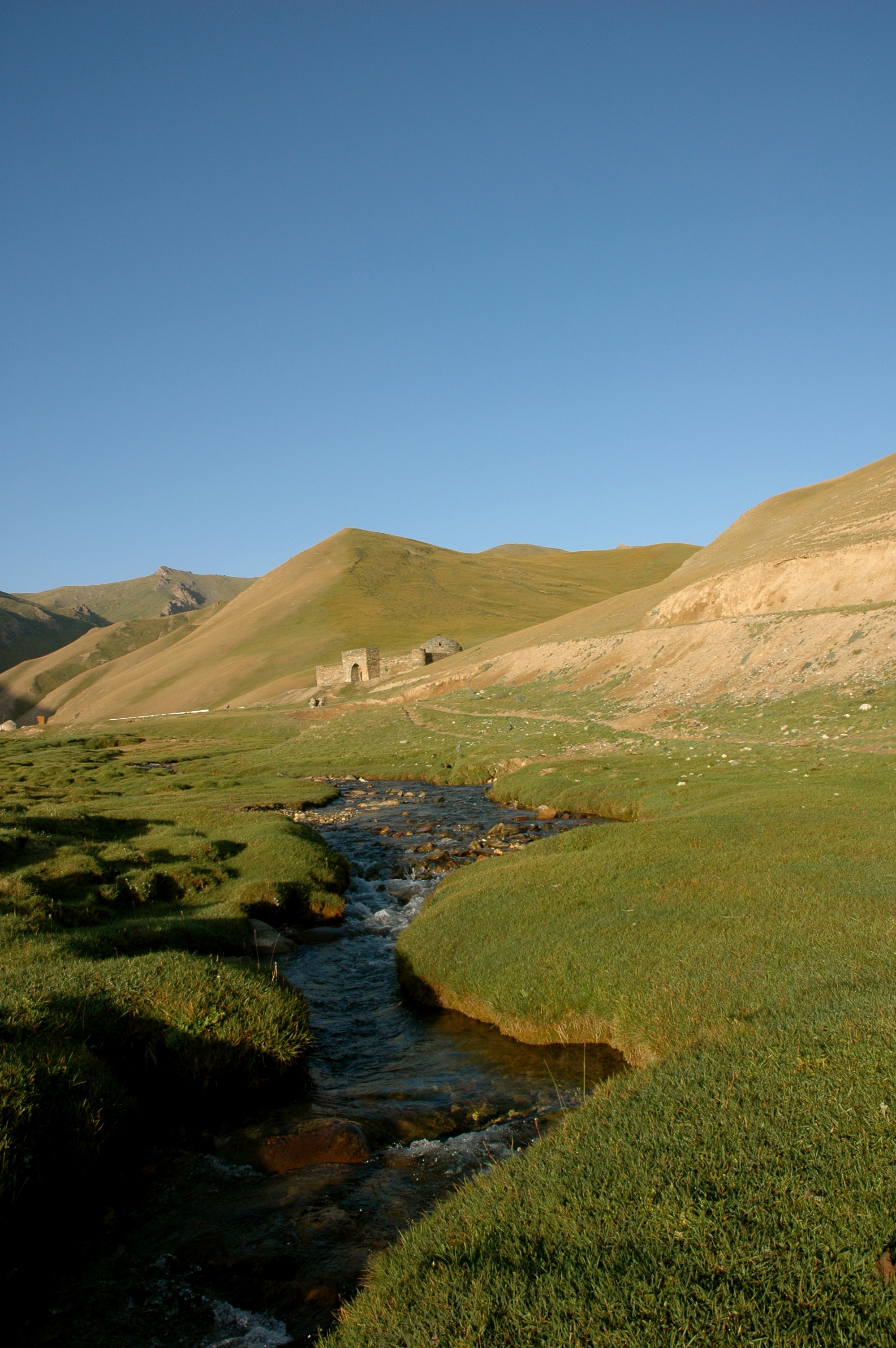
Tash Rabat, a silk road caravansarai used during the Islamic Golden Age

After the Russian Civil War, the period of the New Economic Policy began, which lasted roughly to 1928. The Bolsheviks made an effort to establish a standardized tax system, with higher taxes for nomads to discourage the wandering livelihood, and they divided the Central Asia region into five nation-states. Kyrgyzstan developed considerably in cultural, educational, and social life, literacy was greatly improved. Economic and social development also was notable. Under Stalin a great focus was put on Kyrgyz national identity. The Soviet state was fighting tribalism: its social organization based on patrilineal kinship contradicted the concept of the modern nation state. In a region that did not previously know national institutions or consciousness, the process of nation-building was, from the indigenous perspective, a difficult and ambivalent one.

By the end of the 1920s, the Soviet Union developed a series of five-year plans, centered around industrialization and the collectivization of agriculture, including the creation of huge "kolkhoz" collective farming systems, needed to feed the workers in the industries. Because of the plan's reliance on rapidity, major economic and cultural changes had to occur, which led to conflicts. In Kyrgyzstan, Russian settlers acquired the best pasture land, creating much hardship for most of its original inhabitants, Kazakh, Kyrgyz and Turkmen nomads, who were also forced to settle down on soil that did not have enough agricultural potential. The changes caused unrest, and between 1928 and 1932 nomads and peasants made it clear through methods like passive resistance that they did not agree with these policies, in the Kirgiziya area also guerrilla opposition occurred. The region suffered relatively more deaths from collectivization than any other.

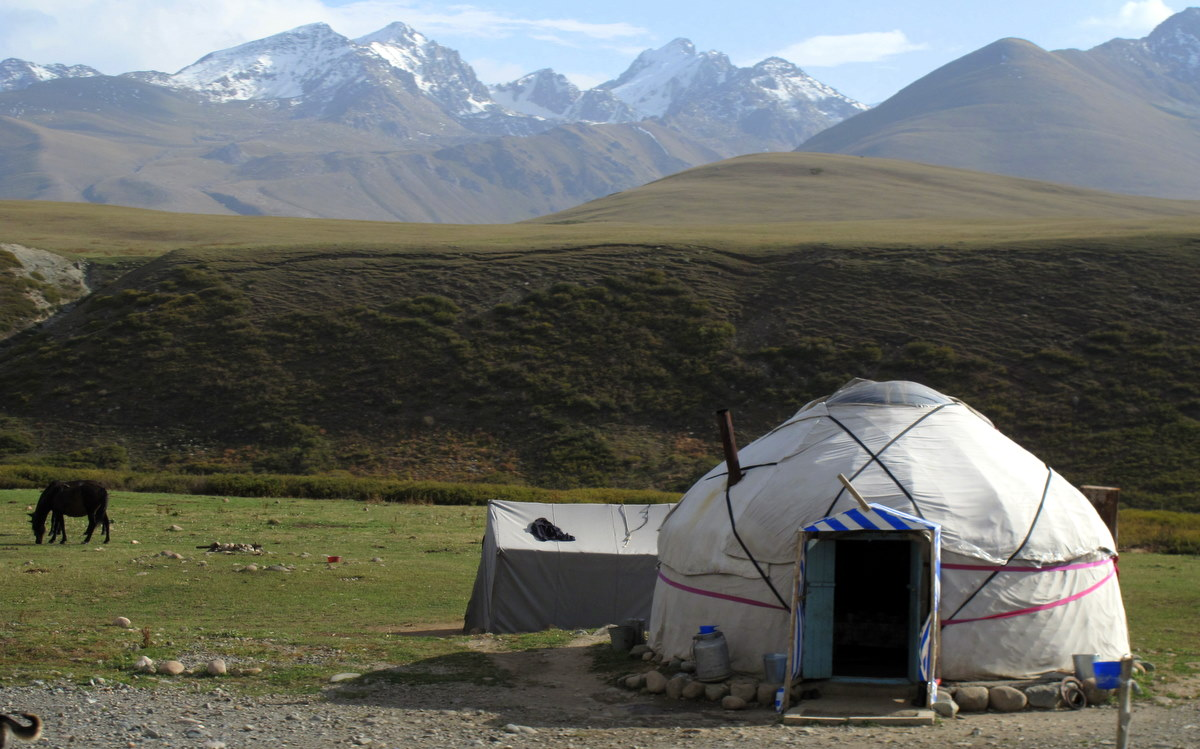
Nomadic farming in the Suusamyr Valley, Kyrgyzstan

The early years of glasnost, in the late 1980s, had little effect on the political climate in Kyrgyzstan. However, the Republic's press was permitted to adopt a more liberal stance and to establish a publication, Literaturny Kirghizstan, by the Union of Writers. Unofficial political groups were forbidden, but several groups that emerged in 1989 to deal with the acute housing crisis were permitted to function.

According to the last Soviet census in 1989, ethnic Kyrgyz made up only 22% of the residents of the northern city of Frunze (now Bishkek), while more than 60% were Russians, Ukrainians, and people from other Slavic nations. Nearly 10% of the city's population were Jewish (very unusual in the Soviet Union, the Jewish Autonomous Oblast being an exception).

In June 1990, ethnic tensions between Uzbeks and Kyrgyz surfaced in the Osh Region (southern Kyrgyzstan), where Uzbeks form a minority of the population. The tensions between Kyrgyzs and Uzbeks in Osis led to 186 deaths. Attempts to appropriate Uzbek collective farms for housing development triggered the Osh Riots. A state of emergency and curfew were introduced and Askar Akayev, the youngest of five sons born into a family of collective farm workers (in northern Kyrgyzstan), was elected president in October 1990. By then, the Kyrgyzstan Democratic Movement had developed into a significant political force with support in Parliament. On 15 December 1990, the Supreme Soviet voted to change the republic's name to the Republic of Kyrgyzstan. In January 1991, Akayev introduced new government structures and appointed a new cabinet composed mainly of younger, reform-oriented politicians. In February the name of the capital was changed back to its pre-revolutionary name of Bishkek.

Despite these political moves toward independence, economic realities seemed to work against secession from the Soviet Union. In a referendum on the preservation of the Soviet Union in March 1991, 88.7% of voters approved retaining the Soviet Union as a "renewed federation".[1] Nevertheless, on 31 August 1991, the Supreme Council of the Kyrgyz Republic adopted the Declaration of State Independence, establishing Kyrgyzstan as an independent state.

On 19 August 1991, when the State Emergency Committee assumed power in Moscow, there was an attempt to depose Akayev in Kyrgyzstan. After the coup collapsed the following week, Akayev and Vice President German Kuznetsov announced their resignations from the Communist Party of the Soviet Union (CPSU), and the entire bureau and secretariat resigned. This was followed by the Supreme Soviet vote declaring independence from the Soviet Union on 31 August 1991 as the Republic of Kyrgyzstan. According to a 2013 Gallup poll, 62% of Kyrgyz people say that the collapse of the Soviet Union harmed their country, while only 16% said that the collapse benefitted it.

=== Independence ===
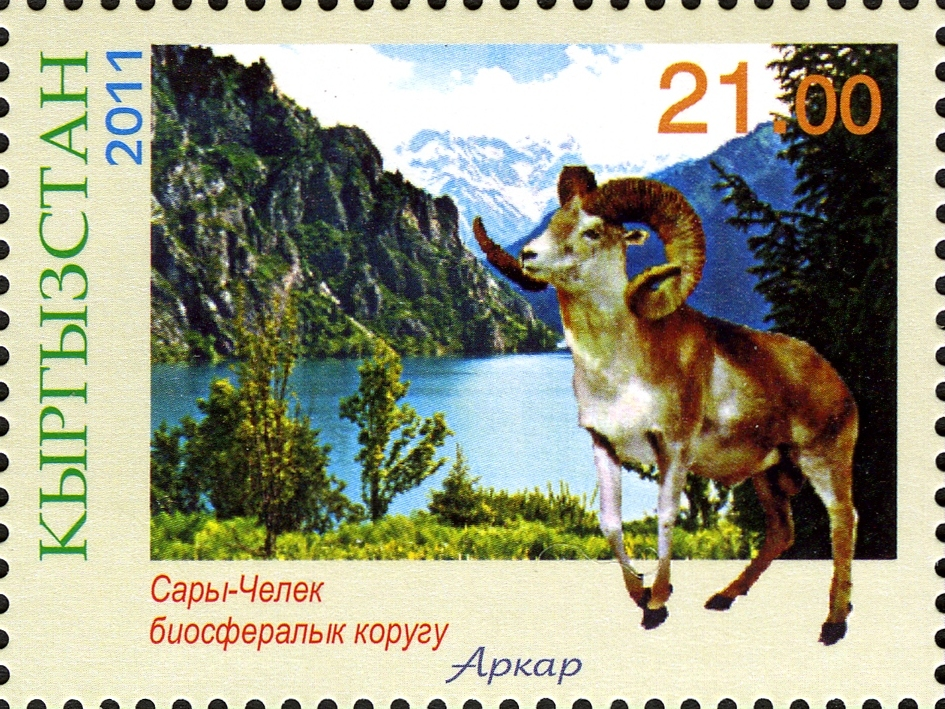
Wild sheep, urial, on a Kyrgyzstan stamp

In October 1991, Akayev ran unopposed and was elected president of the new independent republic by direct ballot, receiving 95 percent of the votes cast. Together with representatives of seven other republics that same month, he signed the Treaty of the Economic Community. On 8 December the leaders of three out of four Soviet Union's founding republics (Russia, Belarus and Ukraine) signed the Belavezha Accords, denouncing the Union Treaty of 1922, declaring that the Soviet Union would cease to exist and proclaimed the Commonwealth of Independent States in its place.

On 21 December Kyrgyzstan (Note: Kyrgyzstan declared independence from the Soviet Union on 31 August 1991, following a vote by its Supreme Soviet.) agreed with the other four Central Asian Republics (Tajikistan, (Note: Tajikistan declared independence from the Soviet Union on 9 September 1991, by decision of its Supreme Soviet.) Turkmenistan, (Note: Turkmenistan declared independence from the Soviet Union on 27 October 1991, following a unanimous vote in its Supreme Council.) Uzbekistan, (Note: Uzbekistan declared independence on 31 August 1991, and the decision was confirmed by a law passed the same day.) and Kazakhstan (Note: Kazakhstan declared independence on 16 December 1991, becoming the last Soviet republic to do so.)) to the Alma-Ata Protocol, formally entering the commonwealth with Armenia, (Note: Armenia declared independence on 21 September 1991, confirmed by a nationwide referendum held on the same day.) Azerbaijan, (Note: Azerbaijan declared independence on 30 August 1991, through a resolution adopted by its Supreme Soviet.) Moldova, (Note: Moldova declared independence on 27 August 1991, through a vote of its parliament following the failed Soviet coup.) and Ukraine. (Note: Ukraine declared independence on 24 August 1991; this was confirmed by over 90% of voters in a national referendum on 1 December 1991.) Kyrgyzstan gained full independence on 25 December 1991. On 26 December the Soviet Union ceased to exist. In 1992, Kyrgyzstan joined the United Nations and the Organization for Security and Co-operation in Europe. On 5 May 1993, the official name changed from the Republic of Kyrgyzstan to the Kyrgyz Republic following the adoption of the Constitution of Kyrgyzstan. Kyrgyzstan celebrates its Independence Day annually on 31 August, the anniversary of its declaration of independence in 1991.

=== 21st century ===
==== 2000–2009 ====
In February and March 2005, parliamentary elections were held, which the opposition and international observers criticized for alleged irregularities. Widespread protests erupted, leading to the ousting of President Askar Akayev, who fled the country and resigned in April. This series of events became known as the Tulip Revolution. Subsequently, Kurmanbek Bakiyev, a former prime minister and opposition leader, assumed the presidency after winning the July 2005 presidential election with a significant majority.

After assuming office, President Bakiyev faced challenges including political unrest and demands for constitutional reforms. In 2006 and 2007, large-scale protests occurred with citizens calling for a reduction in presidential powers and increased governmental transparency. In response, Bakiyev implemented constitutional amendments and appointed opposition figures to key positions. Despite these measures, tensions persisted throughout his tenure.

Throughout the decade, Kyrgyzstan grappled with economic difficulties, including energy shortages and rising utility prices. In 2009, the government announced significant increases in electricity and heating tariffs, leading to public discontent. Additionally, the country faced challenges related to corruption and organized crime, which impacted its social and economic development.

In 2009, Bakiyev announced the eviction of the U.S. military from the Manas Air Base, a strategic transit center supporting operations in Afghanistan. The Manas Air Base, hosting approximately 1,000 U.S. military personnel since 2001, served as a crucial staging post for coalition forces in Afghanistan.

==== 2010–2019 ====
In April 2010, widespread protests erupted against Bakiyev's administration, driven by public discontent over corruption and rising energy prices. These demonstrations culminated in Bakiyev's ousting and the establishment of a provisional government led by Roza Otunbayeva. In June violent ethnic clashes occurred in the southern cities of Osh and Jalal-Abad between Kyrgyz and Uzbek communities, resulting in over 400 deaths and displacing thousands. Following these events, a referendum was held in June to adopt a new constitution aimed at reducing presidential powers and enhancing parliamentary authority. The referendum passed with approximately 90% approval and a 70% voter turnout, despite challenges posed by recent unrest. This constitution introduced a single six-year term for the president without the possibility of re-election and limited any single political party to 65 of the 120 parliamentary seats to prevent power concentration.

Under the new constitutional framework, Kyrgyzstan held its first parliamentary elections in October 2010, which were noted for their peaceful conduct and absence of major voting irregularities. In 2011, Almazbek Atambayev was elected president, serving until 2017. His tenure focused on stabilizing the country and implementing democratic reforms, including the introduction of biometric registration to enhance electoral transparency. In 2017, Sooronbay Jeenbekov succeeded Atambayev as president, continuing efforts to strengthen democratic institutions and address ongoing challenges such as corruption and economic development.

Significant reforms were undertaken during this period, including the abolition of military courts in December 2016 to streamline the judicial system and enhance civilian oversight. Additionally, the Ministry of Defense was restructured into the State Committee for Defense Affairs, with operational control of the armed forces transferred to the General Staff to improve military efficiency and accountability.

In 2016, Kyrgyzstan commemorated the centennial of the 1916 uprising against tsarist Russia, known as Urkun, by unveiling a monument at the Ata-Beyit memorial complex.

==== Since 2020 ====
In October 2020, widespread protests erupted in response to disputed 2020 parliamentary election results, leading to the annulment of the elections and the resignation of President Sooronbay Jeenbekov. Amid the unrest, Sadyr Japarov, a nationalist politician previously imprisoned, was released and subsequently appointed as interim president and prime minister. His rapid ascent to power was facilitated by parliamentary approval under contentious circumstances. In January 2021, Japarov was elected president in a landslide victory.

Following his election, Japarov initiated a series of constitutional reforms aimed at shifting the country's governance structure from a parliamentary to a presidential system. A referendum in January 2021 approved these changes, granting the president expanded powers, including the authority to appoint judges and diminishing the role of parliament. Critics labeled the new constitution the "Khanstitution", expressing concerns over the potential for authoritarian rule.

The period also witnessed increased pressure on independent media and civil society organizations. In 2024, the government implemented measures to intimidate and silence journalists and critics. The Supreme Court ordered the closure of a leading investigative media outlet, sentencing two journalists to prison terms and placing two others on probation for their reporting. Additionally, a "foreign representatives" law came into effect in April 2024, imposing strict government oversight on NGOs receiving foreign funding.

Kyrgyzstan's longstanding border disputes with neighboring Tajikistan escalated into violent clashes, notably around the town of Batken in 2021 and 2022, culminating in a six-day conflict in September 2022. In March 2025, Presidents Japarov and Emomali Rahmon of Tajikistan signed an agreement to demarcate their shared border, aiming to resolve the territorial conflicts and reopen transportation links that had been closed since the 2022 clashes.

In December 2024, President Japarov dismissed Prime Minister Akylbek Japarov, who had served since 2021, citing a transfer to another position. First Deputy Prime Minister Adylbek Kasymaliyev was appointed as acting prime minister.

== Geography ==
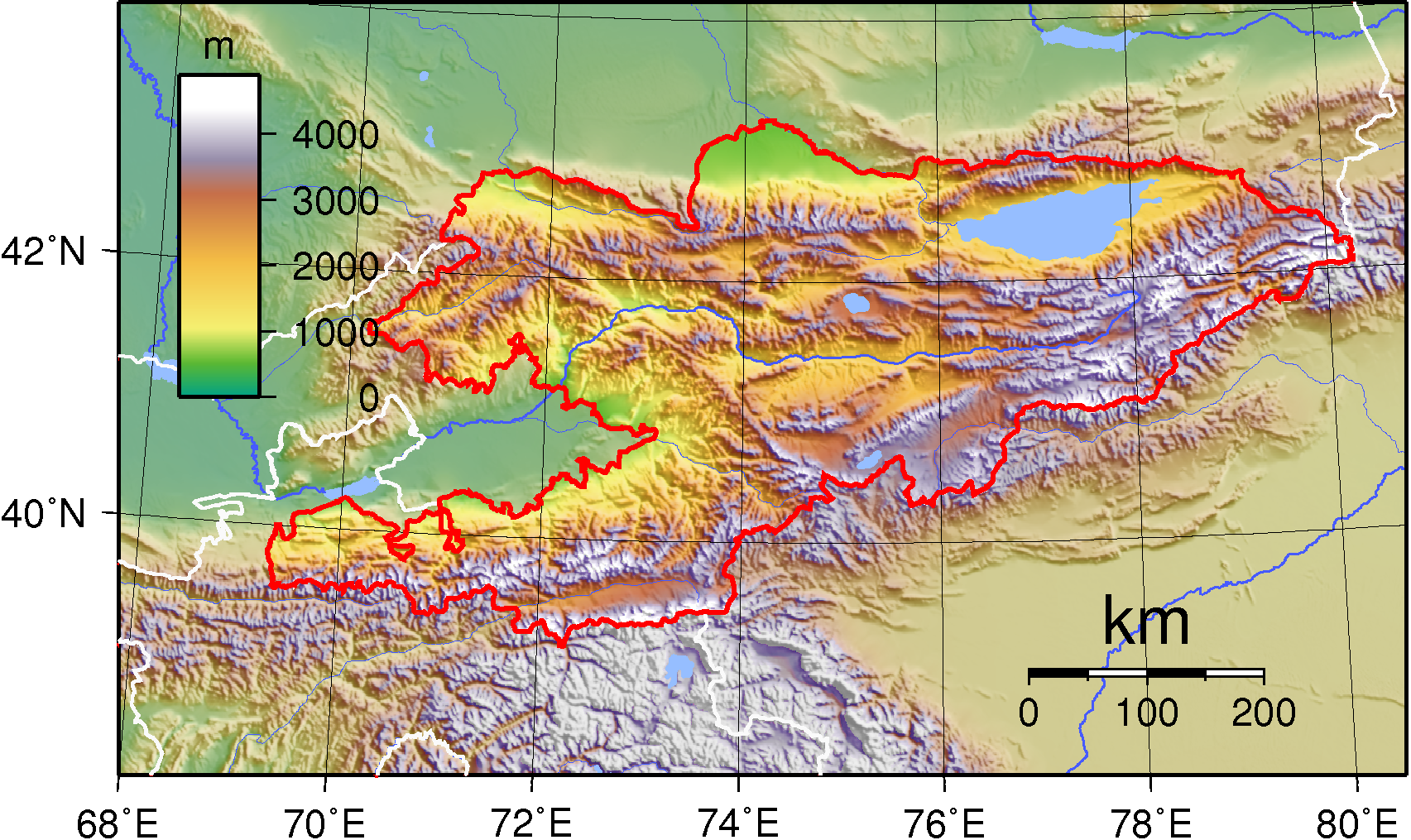
Kyrgyzstan's topography

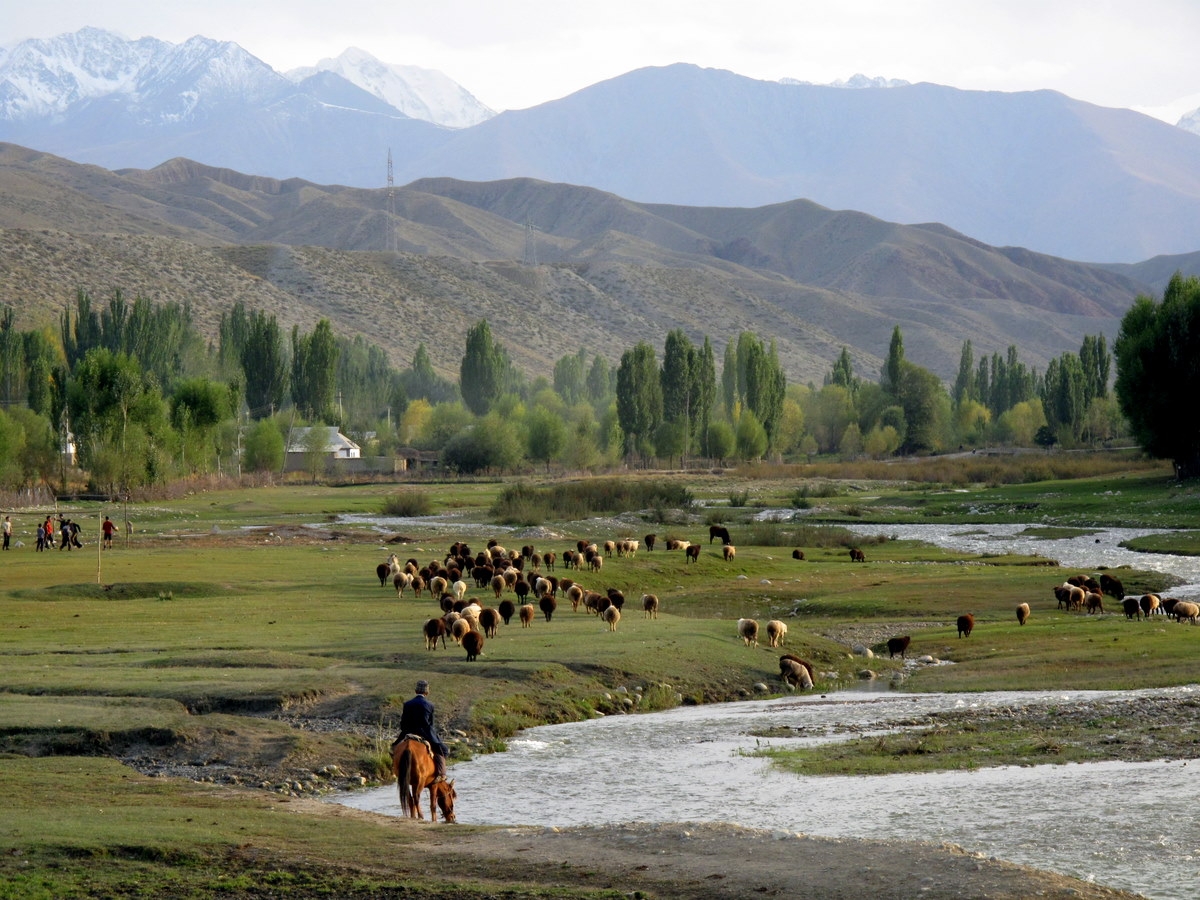
On the southern shore of Issyk Kul lake, Issyk Kul Region

Kyrgyzstan is a landlocked country in Central Asia, bordering Kazakhstan, China, Tajikistan and Uzbekistan. It lies between latitudes 39° and 44° N, and longitudes 69° and 81° E. It is farther from the sea than any other individual country and is an endorheic basin in which all its rivers flow into closed drainage systems which do not reach the sea. The mountainous region of the Tian Shan covers over 80% of the country (Kyrgyzstan is occasionally referred to as "the Switzerland of Central Asia" as a result), with the remainder made up of valleys and basins.

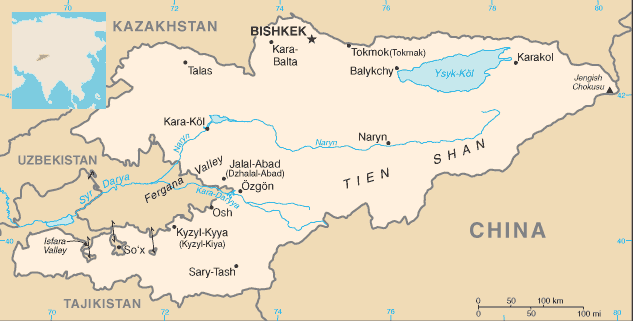
A map of Kyrgyzstan

Issyk-Kul Lake, or Ysyk-Köl in Kyrgyz, in the north-eastern Tian Shan is the largest lake in Kyrgyzstan and the second largest mountain lake in the world after Titicaca. The Kara Darya (Karadar'ya) river at 132 meters is the lowest point, and the highest peaks are in the Kakshaal Too range, forming the Chinese border. Jengish Chokusu at 7,439 m (24,406 ft) is the highest point and is considered by geologists to be the northernmost peak over 7,000 m (22,966 ft) in the world. Heavy snowfall in winter leads to spring floods which often cause serious damage downstream. The runoff from the mountains is also used for hydro-electricity. Kyrgyzstan has significant deposits of metals including gold and rare-earth metals. With predominantly mountainous terrain, less than 8% of the land is cultivated, and this is concentrated in the northern lowlands and the fringes of the Fergana Valley.

Bishkek is the capital and largest city, with 1,321,900 inhabitants (as of 2025). The second largest city is Osh, located in the Fergana Valley near the border with Uzbekistan. The principal river is the Kara Darya, which flows west through the Fergana Valley into Uzbekistan. Across the border in Uzbekistan it meets the Naryn. The confluence forms the Syr Darya, which originally flowed into the Aral Sea. As of 2010, it no longer reaches the sea, as its water is withdrawn upstream to irrigate cotton fields in Tajikistan, Uzbekistan, and southern Kazakhstan. The Chu River also briefly flows through Kyrgyzstan before entering Kazakhstan.

Kyrgyzstan contains seven terrestrial ecosystems: Tian Shan montane conifer forests, Alai-Western Tian Shan steppe, Gissaro-Alai open woodlands, Tian Shan foothill arid steppe, Pamir alpine desert and tundra, Tian Shan montane steppe and meadows, and Central Asian northern desert. It has a 2019 Forest Landscape Integrity Index mean score of 8.86/10, ranking it 13th globally out of 172 countries.

=== Climate ===
Kyrgyzstan map of Köppen climate classification

The climate varies regionally. The low-lying Fergana Valley in the southwest is extremely hot in summer, with temperatures reaching 40 °C (104 °F). The northern foothills are temperate, and the Tian Shan varies from dry continental to polar climate, depending on elevation. In the coldest areas, winter temperatures drop below freezing for approximately 40 days, and even some desert areas experience constant snowfall during this period. In the lowlands the temperature ranges from around −6 °C (21 °F) in January to 24 °C (75 °F) in July.

==== Glaciers and climate change ====
Reduction of glacier area in the Borkoldoy range (1965–2010)

Climate change is evident in Kyrgyzstan. Among the countries in Eastern Europe and Central Asia, Kyrgyzstan is the third most vulnerable to the effects of climate change, such as changes in weather patterns that could lead to prolonged periods of precipitation and drought. The average temperature has increased from 4.8 °C to 6 °C so far within the last 20 years. In 2013 the World Bank estimated a likely increase of 2 °C in average mean temperature by 2060 and of 4–5 °C by 2100, noting that the country's glaciers were significantly reduced and projected to decline further. A significant warming trend in Kyrgyzstan with a projected increase of 6°C under the Shared Socioeconomic Pathway (SSP) scenario SSP5-8.5 from 2076 to 2096. However the very slight increase in temperature is expected to positively affect climate-sensitive sectors such as agriculture, energy, and forestry as more land is within the optimum temperature band.

=== Enclaves and exclaves ===
Barak (population 627) in the Fergana Valley is an exclave. The village is surrounded by Uzbek territory. It is located on the road from Osh (Kyrgyzstan) to Khodjaabad (Uzbekistan) about 4 kilometres (2 miles) north-west from the Kyrgyz–Uzbek border in the direction of Andijan. Barak is administratively part of Kara-Suu District in Kyrgyzstan's Osh Region.

There are four Uzbek enclaves within Kyrgyzstan. Two of them are the towns of Sokh, with an area of 325 km^{2} (125 sq mi) and a population of 42,800 in 1993, although some estimates go as high as 70,000 (99% are Tajiks, the remainder Uzbeks); and Shakhimardan (also known as Shahimardan, Shohimardon, or Shah-i-Mardan), with an area of 90 km^{2} (35 sq mi) and a population of 5,100 in 1993; 91% are Uzbeks, and the remaining 9% are Kyrgyz; the other two are the tiny territories of Chong-Kara (roughly 3 km (2 mi) long by 1 km (0.6 mi) wide) and Jangy-ayyl (a dot of land barely 2–3 km (1–2 mi) across). Chong-Kara is on the Sokh river, between the Uzbek border and the Sokh enclave. Jangy-ayyl is about 60 kilometres (37 mi) east of Batken, in a northward projection of the Kyrgyz-Uzbek border near Khalmion.

There are also two enclaves belonging to Tajikistan on the Kyrgyz-Tajik border: Vorukh, and Lolazor. Vorukh has an area between 95–130 km^{2} (37–50 sq mi), and a population estimated between 23,000 and 29,000, 95% Tajiks and 5% Kyrgyz. It is distributed among 17 villages and is located around 45 kilometres (28 mi) south of Isfara on the right bank of the river Karavshin. Lolazor (Western Qalacha or Kayragach) is a small settlement near the Kyrgyz railway station of Kairagach.

== Government and politics ==
=== Political system ===
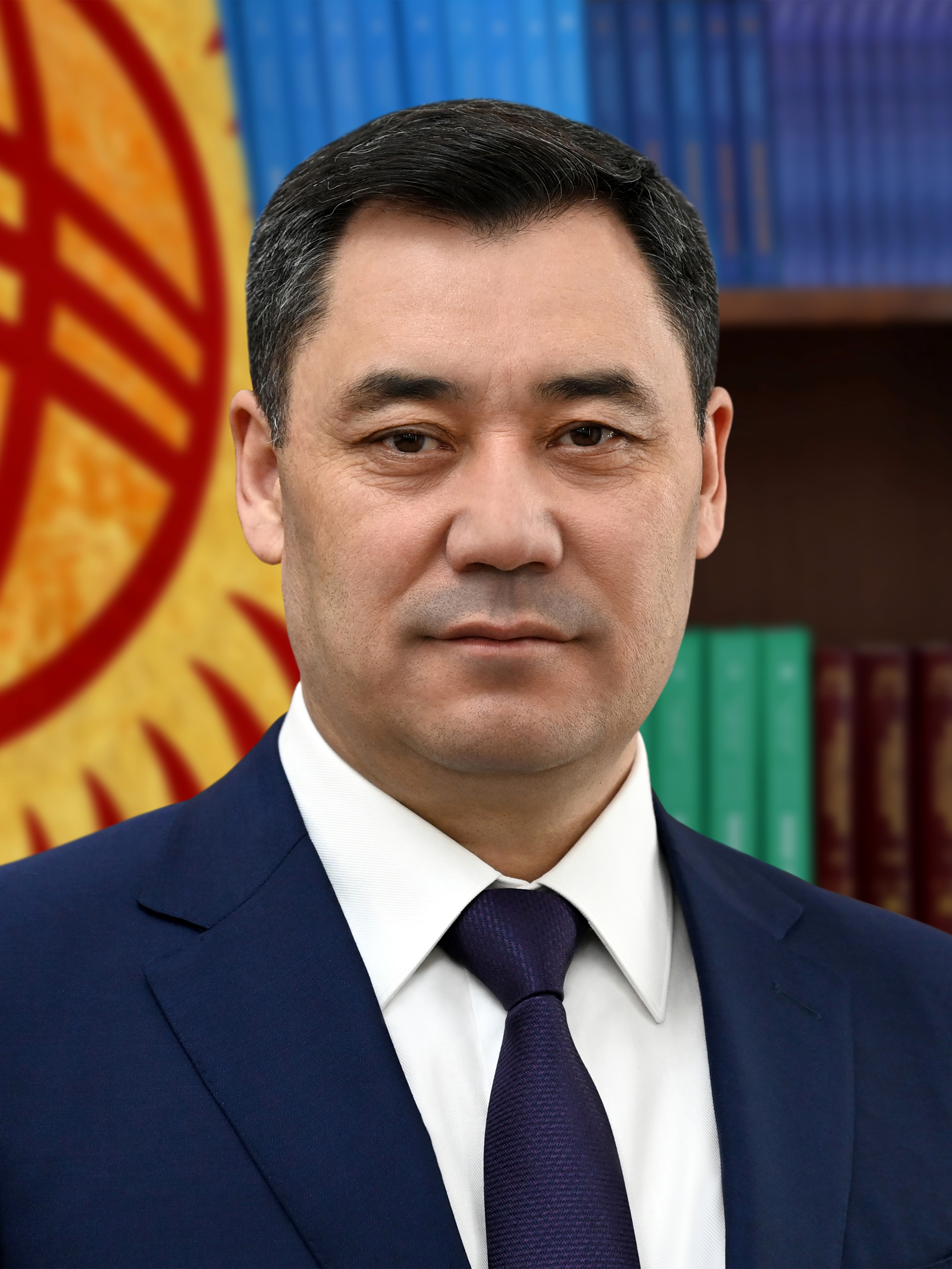
Sadyr Japarov
President

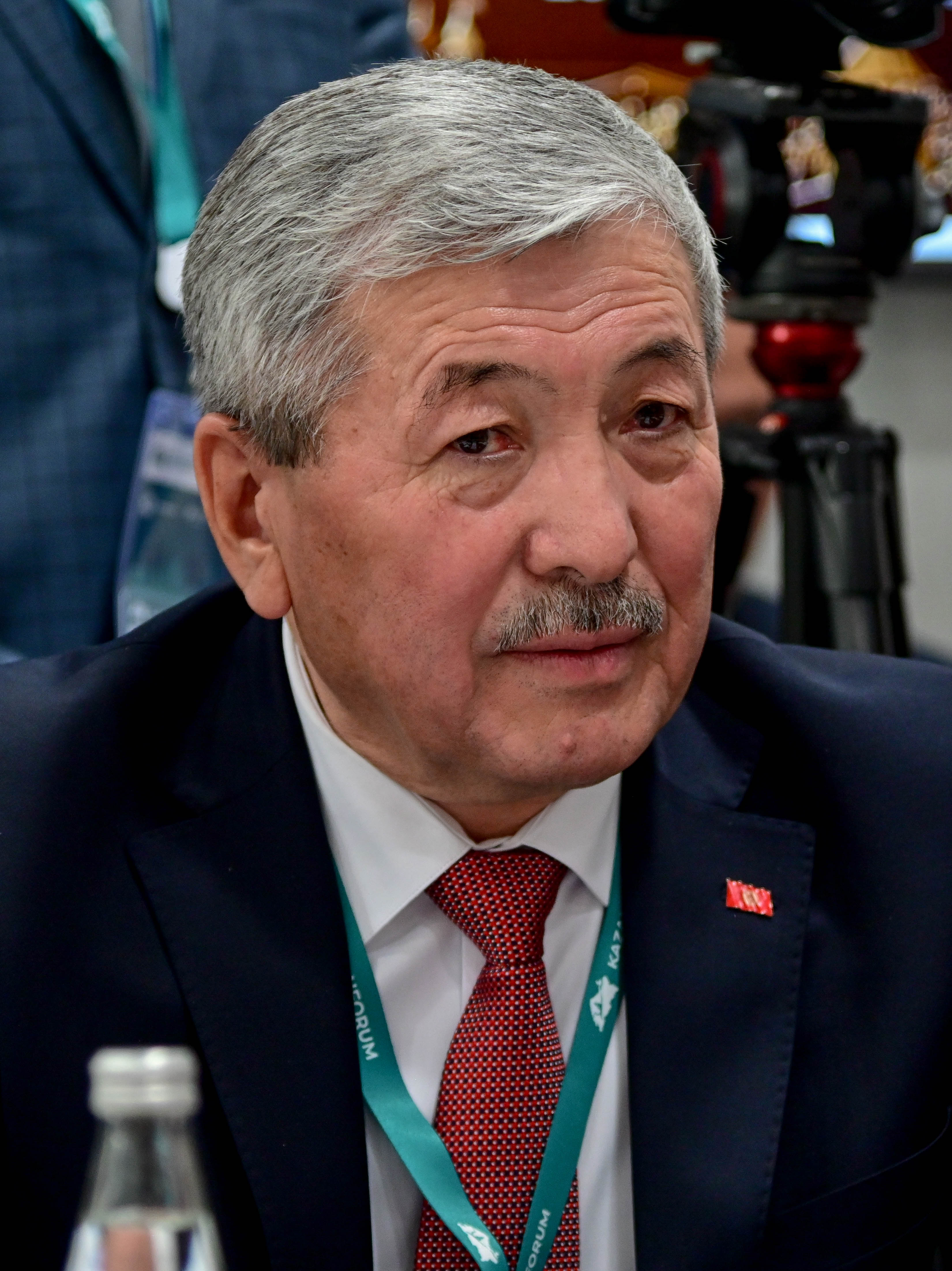
Adylbek Kasymaliev
Prime Minister

Supreme Council building in Bishkek, house of the unicameral parliament. View from the north-west side (facade from the south)

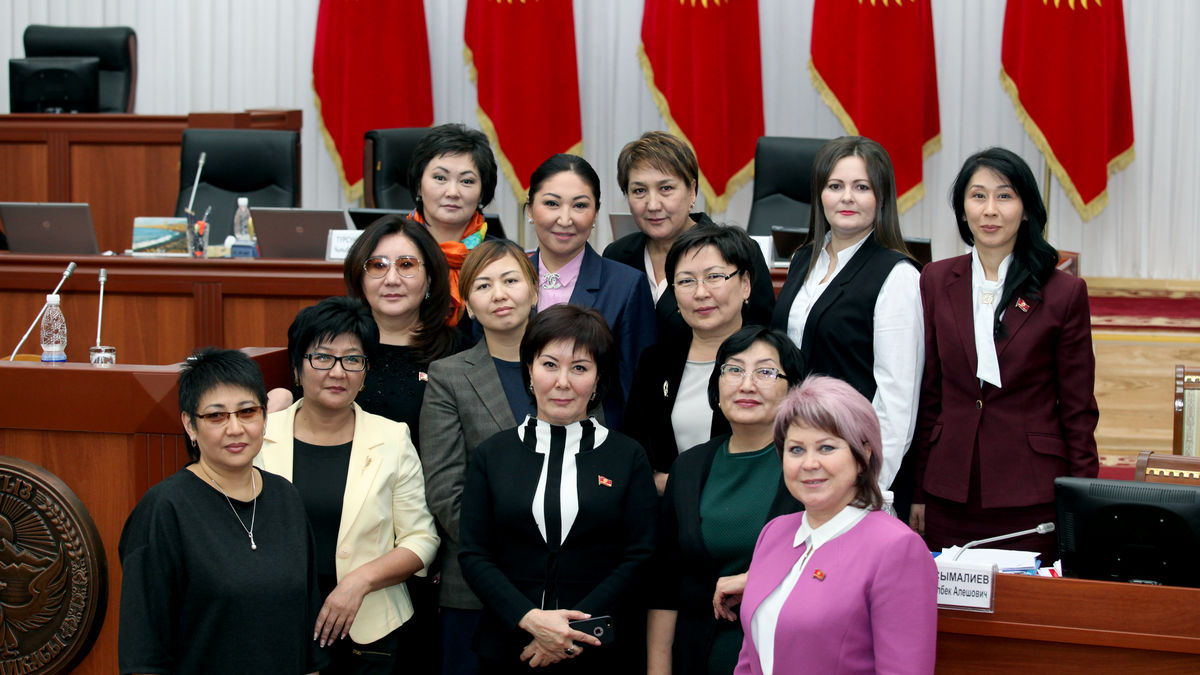
Kyrgyz women parliamentarians, 2016

The 1993 constitution defines the form of government as a democratic unicameral republic. The executive branch includes a president and prime minister. The parliament currently is unicameral. The judicial branch comprises a supreme court, local courts and a chief prosecutor.

In March 2002, in the southern district of Aksy, five people protesting the arbitrary arrest of an opposition politician were shot dead by police, sparking nationwide protests. President Askar Akayev initiated a constitutional reform process which initially included the participation of a broad range of government, civil and social representatives in an open dialogue, leading to a February 2003 referendum marred by voting irregularities.

The amendments to the constitution approved by the referendum resulted in stronger control by the president and weakened the parliament and the Constitutional Court. Parliamentary elections for a new, 75-seat unicameral legislature were widely viewed as corrupt. The subsequent protests led to a bloodless coup on 24 March 2005, after which Akayev fled the country with his family and was replaced by acting President Kurmanbek Bakiyev.

In July 2005, Bakiyev won the presidential election in a landslide with 88.9% of the vote. However, initial public support for his administration substantially declined in subsequent months as a result of its apparent inability to solve the corruption problems that had plagued the country since its independence from the Soviet Union, along with the murders of several members of parliament. Large-scale protests against Bakiyev took place in Bishkek in April and November 2006, with opposition leaders accusing the president of failing to live up to his election promises to reform the country's constitution and transfer many of his presidential powers to parliament.

Kyrgyzstan is a member of the Organization for Security and Cooperation in Europe (OSCE), a league of 57 participating states committed to peace, transparency, and the protection of human rights in Eurasia. As an OSCE participating state, Kyrgyzstan's international commitments are subject to monitoring under the mandate of the U.S. Helsinki Commission.

In December 2008, the state-owned broadcast KTRK announced that it would require prior submission of Radio Free Europe/Radio Liberty programmes, which KTRK are required to retransmit according to a 2005 agreement. KTRK had stopped retransmitting RFE/RL programming in October 2008, a week after it failed to broadcast an RFE/RL programme called Inconvenient Questions which covered the October elections, claiming to have lost the missing material. Bakiyev had criticised this programme in September, while KTRK told RFE/RL that its programming was too negative. Reporters Without Borders, which ranks Kyrgyzstan 111th out of 173 countries on its Press Freedom Index, strongly criticised the decision.

In February 2009 Bakiyev announced the imminent closure of the Manas Air Base, the only US military base remaining in Central Asia. The closure was approved by Parliament by a vote of 78–1. However, after much behind-the-scenes negotiation between Kyrgyz, Russian and American diplomats, the decision was reversed. The Americans were allowed to remain under a new contract, whereby rent would increase from $17.4 million to $60 million annually. The US military fully withdrew from Manas Air Base in 2014.

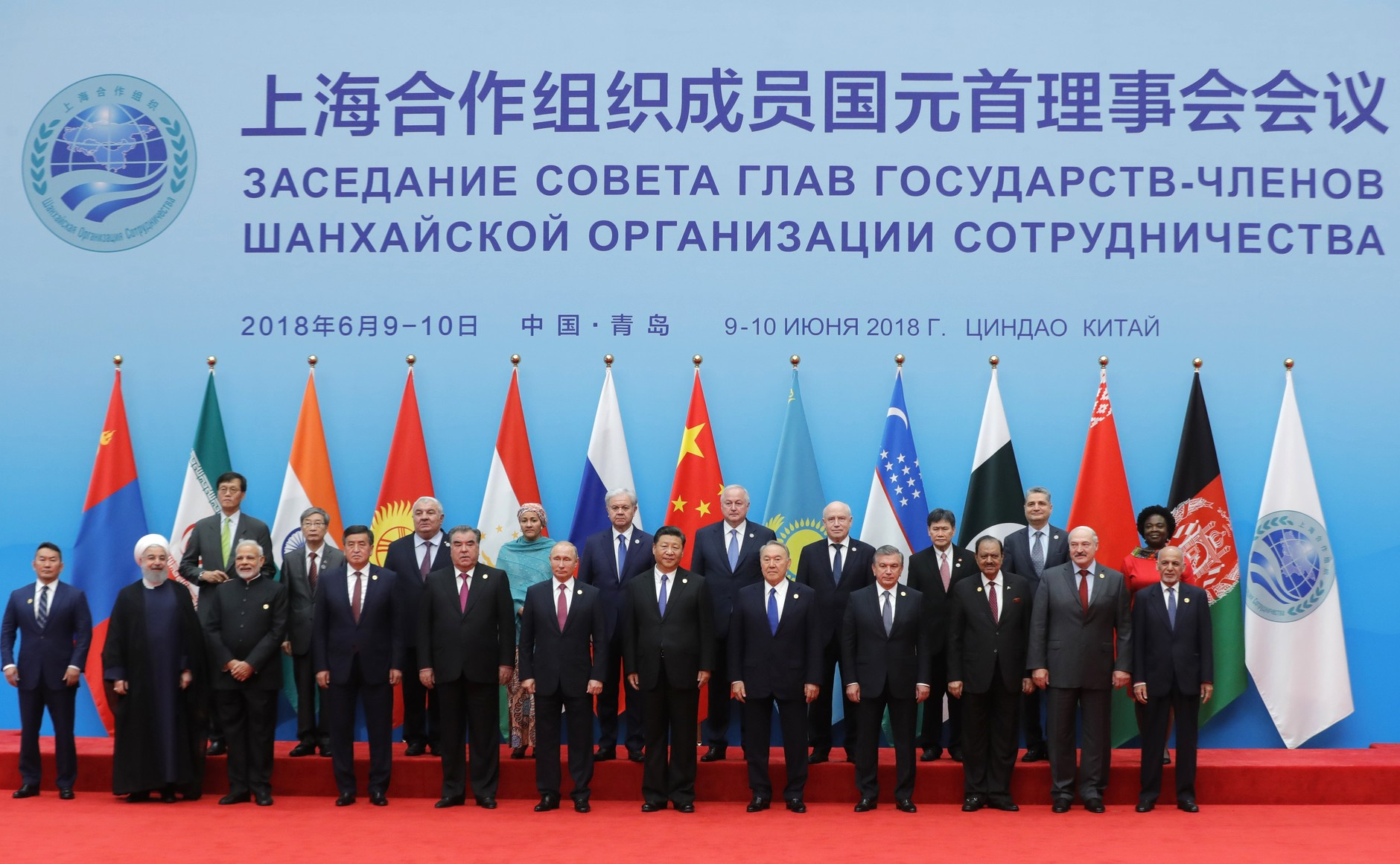
President Jeenbekov at the Shanghai Cooperation Organisation summit in China, June 2018

Kyrgyzstan is among the 50 countries in the world with the highest perceived level of corruption: the 2025 Corruption Perception Index is 26 on a scale of 0 (most corrupt) to 100 (least corrupt).

In the 2010 Kyrgyz Revolution, Bakiyev and his relatives—including his son Maksim and brother Janish—were forced to flee to Kazakhstan and then sought asylum in Belarus. Roza Otunbayeva, who was appointed interim president, announced that she did not intend to run for the presidential elections in 2011. The election was won by Prime Minister Almazbek Atambayev, leader of the Social Democratic Party. Omurbek Babanov was appointed prime minister.

In 2015, Kyrgyzstan became a full-fledged member of the Eurasian Economic Union after it formally abolished customs controls along its border with Kazakhstan. Other members are the former Soviet republics Russia, Kazakhstan, Belarus, and Armenia.

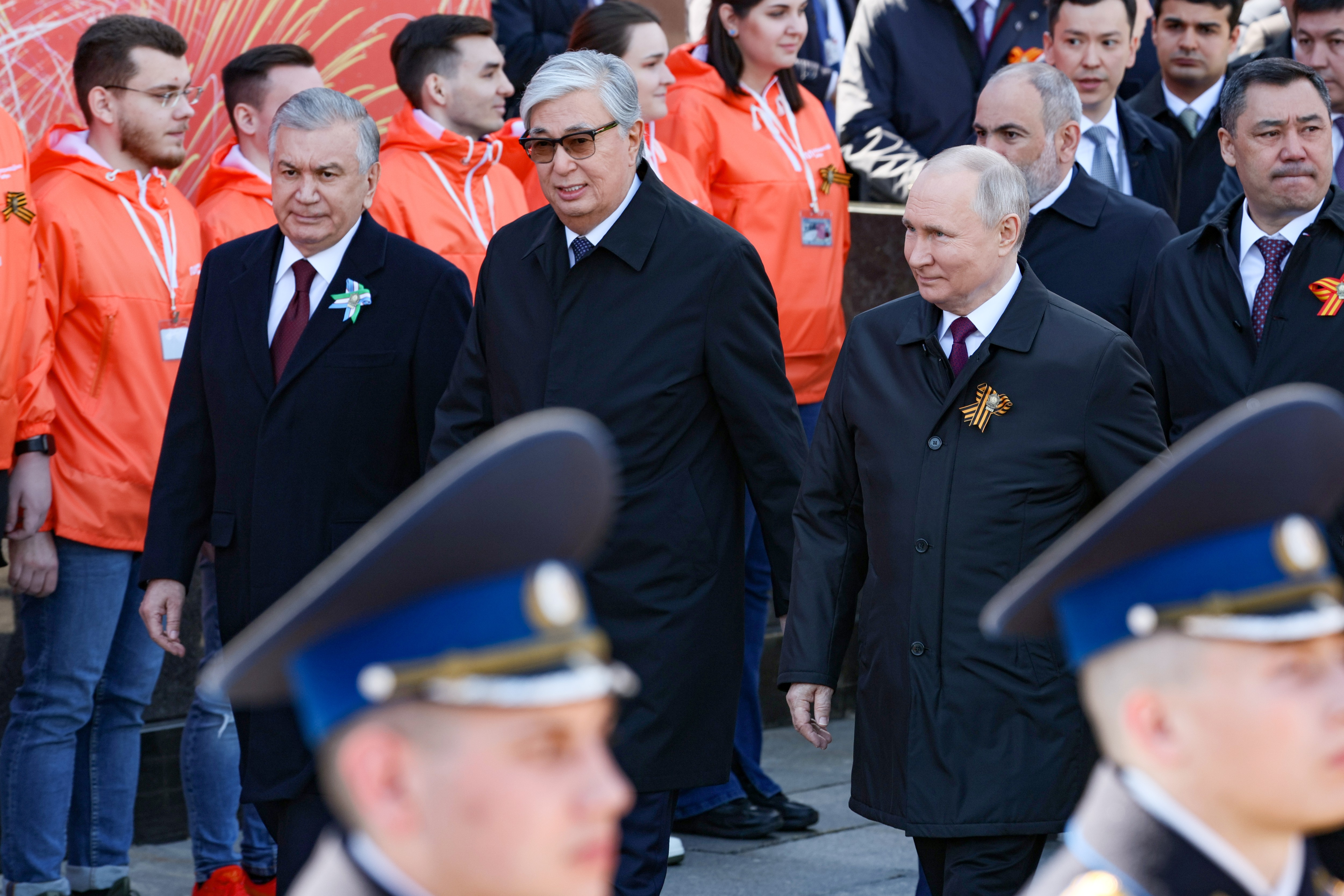
President Japarov (right) with Vladimir Putin and other post-Soviet leaders at the 2023 Moscow Victory Day Parade

In October 2017, Sooronbay Jeenbekov, a former prime minister backed by incumbent Almazbek Atambayev, was elected president. In foreign policy he saw the Kremlin as the country's "main strategic partner" and China as an "important strategic and trade partner", but he intended to seek more collaborative bilateral ties with European partners. On 7 August 2019, the Special Forces of Kyrgyzstan launched an operation against the residence of former President Almazbek Atambayev, supposedly based on charges of corruption made against him. In a meeting of the Security Council, Jeenbekov accused Atambayev of violating the constitution. In October 2020, Jeenbekov resigned after protests caused by irregularities in the parliamentary elections. In January 2021, Sadyr Japarov was elected president after winning the presidential election by a landslide. In April 2021, the majority of voters approved a constitutional referendum which grants additional powers president, significantly strengthening the presidency.

=== Administrative divisions ===
Kyrgyzstan is divided into seven regions (Kyrgyz: облустар). The regions are subdivided into 44 districts (Kyrgyz: аймактар, ajmaktar;). The districts are further subdivided into rural districts at the lowest level of administration, which include all rural settlements (Kyrgyz: айыл өкмөтү, romanized: ayıl ökmötü) and villages without an associated municipal government.

The cities of Bishkek and Osh have status "state importance" and do not belong to any region.

Each region is headed by an akim (regional governor) appointed by the president. District akims are appointed by regional akims.

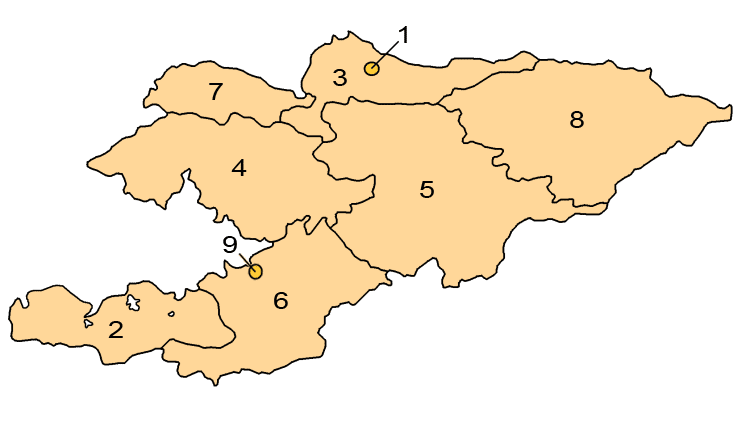
A clickable map of Kyrgyzstan exhibiting its provinces.

The regions, and independent cities, are as follows, with subdivisions:

1. City of Bishkek
  1. Lenin District
  2. Oktyabr District
  3. Birinchi Maj District
  4. Sverdlov District
2. Batken Region
  1. Batken District
  2. Kadamjay District
  3. Leylek District
3. Chüy Region
  1. Alamüdün District
  2. Chüj District
  3. Jayıl District
  4. Kemin District
  5. Moskva District
  6. Panfilov District
  7. Sokuluk District
  8. Ysyk-Ata District
4. Jalal-Abad Region
  1. Aksy District
  2. Ala-Buka District
  3. Bazar-Korgon District
  4. Chatkal District
  5. Nooken District
  6. Suzak District
  7. Toguz-Toro District
  8. Toktogul District
5. Naryn Region
  1. Ak-Talaa District
  2. At-Bashy District
  3. Jumgal District
  4. Kochkor District
  5. Naryn District
6. Osh Region
  1. Alay District
  2. Aravan District
  3. Chong-Alay District
  4. Kara-Kulja District
  5. Kara-Suu District
  6. Nookat District
  7. Özgön District
7. Talas Region
  1. Bakay-Ata District
  2. Aytmatov District
  3. Manas District
  4. Talas District
8. Ysyk-Köl Region
  1. Ak-Suu District
  2. Ysyk-Köl District
  3. Jeti-Ögüz District
  4. Tong District
  5. Tüp District
9. City of Osh

=== Military ===
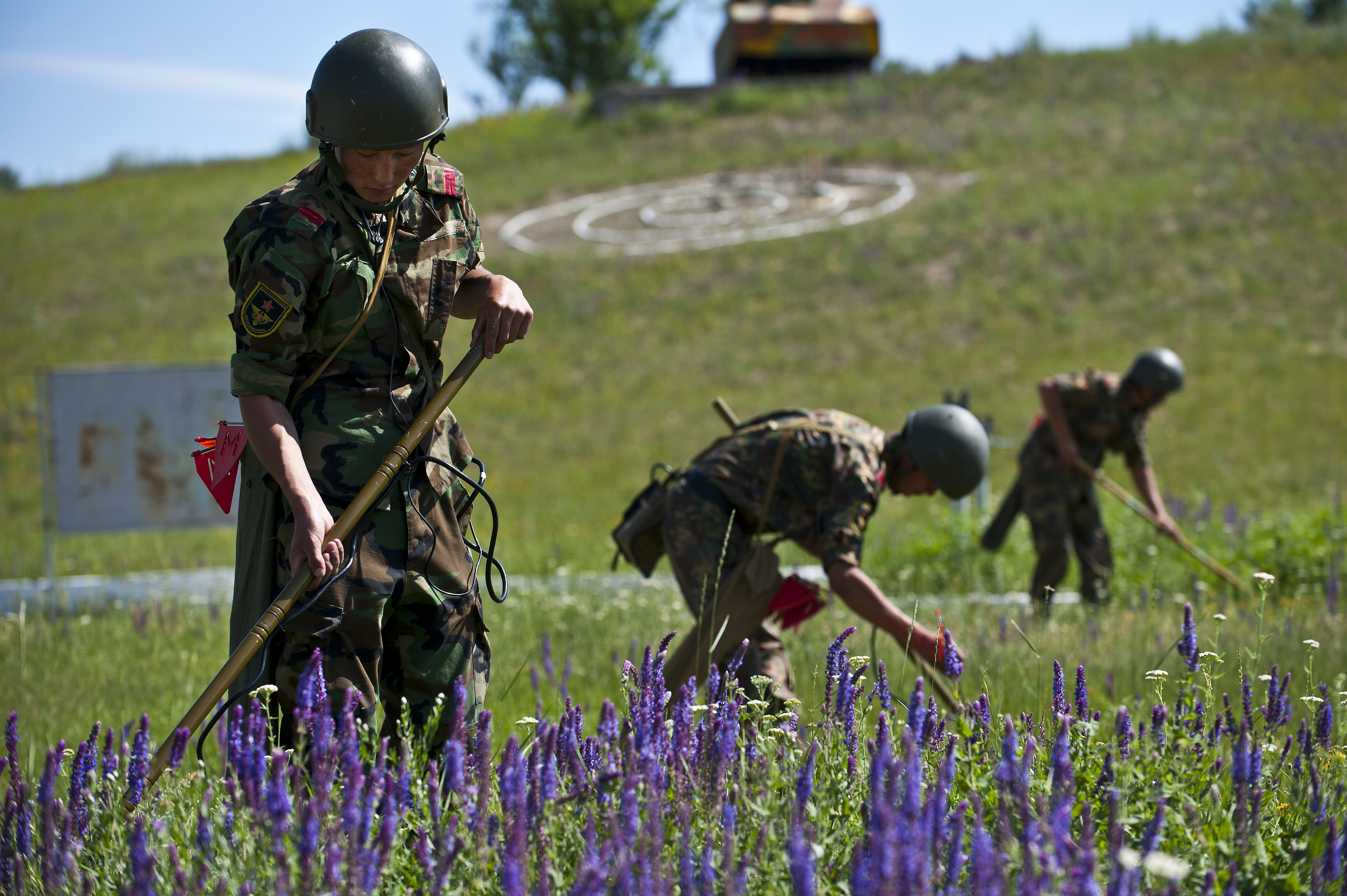
Kyrgyz soldiers conducting mine sweeping exercises

The Armed Forces of Kyrgyzstan were formed after the collapse of the Soviet Union and consist of the Land Forces, Air Forces, internal troops, National Guard, and the border guard. The military works with the US Armed Forces, which leased a facility named the Transit Center at Manas at Manas International Airport near Bishkek until 2014. In recent years, the armed forces have developed relations with Russia including signing modernization deals worth $1.1bn and participating in exercises with Russian troops. The Agency of National Security works with the military and serves similar purposes to its Soviet predecessor, the KGB. It oversees an elite counterterrorism special forces unit known as "Alfa", the same name used by other former Soviet countries, including Russia and Uzbekistan. The police are commanded by the Ministry of the Interior Affairs, along with the border guard.

=== Human rights ===
Kyrgyzstan is classified as a "hybrid regime" in the Democracy Index, ranking 107th out of 167 for 2020. It was ranked "not free" in the 2026 Freedom in the World report with a score of 25/100. After the installation of a more democratic government, many human rights violations still take place. In a move that alarmed human-rights groups, dozens of prominent Uzbek religious and community leaders were arrested by security forces following the 2010 South Kyrgyzstan riots, including journalist and human-rights activist Azimzhan Askarov, who was sentenced to life in prison in 2010.

A law banning women under age 23 from traveling abroad without a parent or guardian, with the purpose of "increased morality and preservation of the gene pool" passed in the Parliament in 2013. American diplomats expressed concern in 2014 when Kyrgyzstan lawmakers passed a law that imposes jail terms on gay-rights activists and others, including journalists, who create "a positive attitude toward non-traditional sexual relations". In 2024, the independent investigative media organization Kloop was ordered shut down by the Kyrgyz courts. This move drew criticism within the country and abroad.

== Economy ==
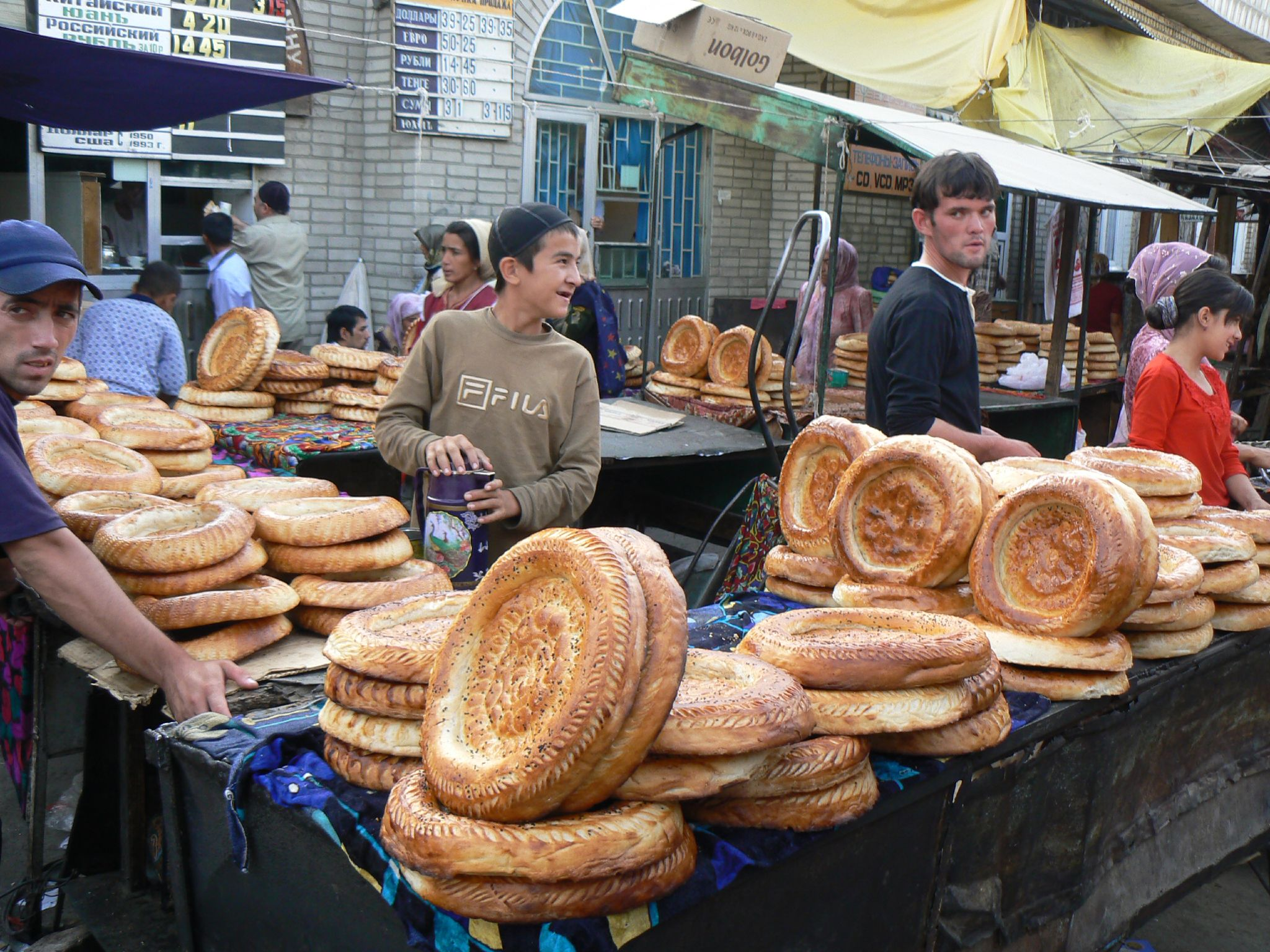
Bazar in Osh

Kyrgyzstan was among the less economically developed republics of the former Soviet Union and is currently the second-lowest in terms of income levels in Central Asia, after Tajikistan. 22.4% of the country's population lives below the poverty line.

Despite the backing of major Western lenders, including the International Monetary Fund, the World Bank and the Asian Development Bank, Kyrgyzstan has had economic difficulties following independence. Initially, these were a result of the breakup of the Soviet trade bloc and resulting loss of markets, which impeded the republic's transition to a demand economy. The government reduced public spending, eliminated most price subsidies, and implemented a value-added tax. These measures reflected its commitment to transitioning toward a market-based economy. Through economic stabilization and structural reforms, the government aimed to promote sustained long-term growth. Reforms led to Kyrgyzstan's accession to the World Trade Organization in 1998.

The economy was severely affected by the collapse of the Soviet Union and the resulting loss of its vast market. In 1990, some 98% of exports went to other parts of the Soviet Union. Thus, the economic performance in the early 1990s was worse than any other former Soviet republic except war-torn Armenia, Azerbaijan and Tajikistan, as factories and state farms collapsed with the disappearance of their traditional markets in the former Soviet Union. While economic performance has improved considerably in the last few years, and particularly since 1998, difficulties remain in securing adequate fiscal revenues and providing an adequate social safety net. Remittances of around 350,000 Kyrgyz migrants working in Russia contribute to the economy, however in recent years remittances have decreased. Reliance on remittances—currently about 15% of GDP—has declined from a previous high of 35%.

By the early 1990s, the private agricultural sector provided between one-third and one-half of some harvests. In 2002, agriculture accounted for 35.6% of GDP and about half of employment. The terrain is mountainous, which accommodates livestock raising, the largest agricultural activity, so the resulting wool, meat and dairy products are major commodities. Main crops include wheat, sugar beets, potatoes, cotton, tobacco, vegetables, and fruit. As the prices of imported agrichemicals and petroleum are so high, much farming is being done by hand and by horse, as it was generations ago. Agricultural processing is a key component of the industrial economy as well as one of the most attractive sectors for foreign investment.

Kyrgyzstan is rich in mineral resources but has negligible petroleum and natural gas reserves; it imports petroleum and gas. Among its mineral reserves are substantial deposits of coal, gold, uranium, antimony, and other valuable metals. Metallurgy is an important industry, and the government hopes to attract foreign investment in this field. The government has actively encouraged foreign involvement in extracting and processing gold from the Kumtor Gold Mine and other regions. The plentiful water resources and mountainous terrain enable it to produce and export large quantities of hydroelectric energy.

The principal exports are nonferrous metals and minerals, woollen goods and other agricultural products, electric energy and certain engineering goods. Imports include petroleum and natural gas, ferrous metals, chemicals, most machinery, wood and paper products, some foods and some construction materials. Its leading trade partners include Germany, Russia, China, Kazakhstan, and Uzbekistan. After Beijing launched the Belt and Road Initiative in 2013, China has expanded its economic presence and initiated a number of sizable infrastructure projects in Kyrgyzstan. After the 2022 sanctions on Russia, several regional supply routes were redirected through Kyrgyzstan, boosting the local economy.

Kyrgyzstan registered rapid economic growth over 2022–2024, averaging 9% annually in real terms. These changes highlight Kyrgyzstan's strategic importance in Central Asia and its emerging role in regional trade and infrastructure networks. Kyrgyzstan demonstrated strong macroeconomic performance between 2022 and 2024. The country maintained a fiscal surplus for two consecutive years, in 2023 and 2024, reflecting prudent public financial management and stronger-than-expected revenue collection. The government is embarking on several large infrastructure megaprojects, notably the Kambarata-1 Hydropower Plant and the China–Kyrgyzstan–Uzbekistan railway, which have the potential to significantly reshape the economic landscape.

=== Tourism ===
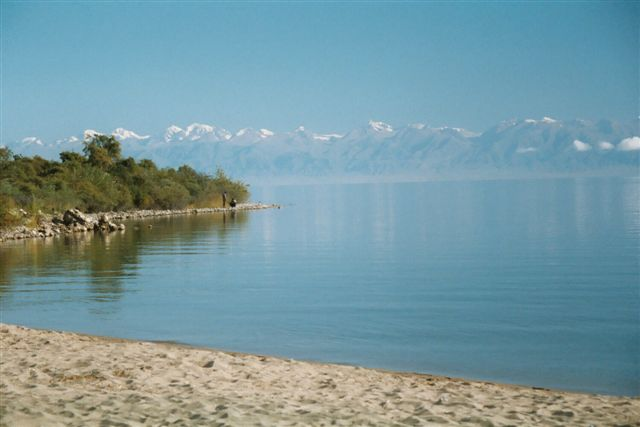
Southern shore of Issyk-Kul Lake.

One of the most popular tourist destination points is Issyk-Kul. Numerous hotels, resorts and boarding houses are located along its northern shore. The most popular beach zones are in Cholpon-Ata and the settlements nearby, such as Kara-Oi (Dolinka), Bosteri and Korumdy. Tourists numbered 3,658,500 in 2024.

=== Science and technology ===
The headquarters of the Kyrgyz Academy of Sciences is located in Bishkek, where several research institutes are located. Researchers are developing useful technologies based on natural products, such as heavy metal remediation for purifying waste water. Kyrgyzstan was ranked 96th in the Global Innovation Index in 2025.

=== Transport ===
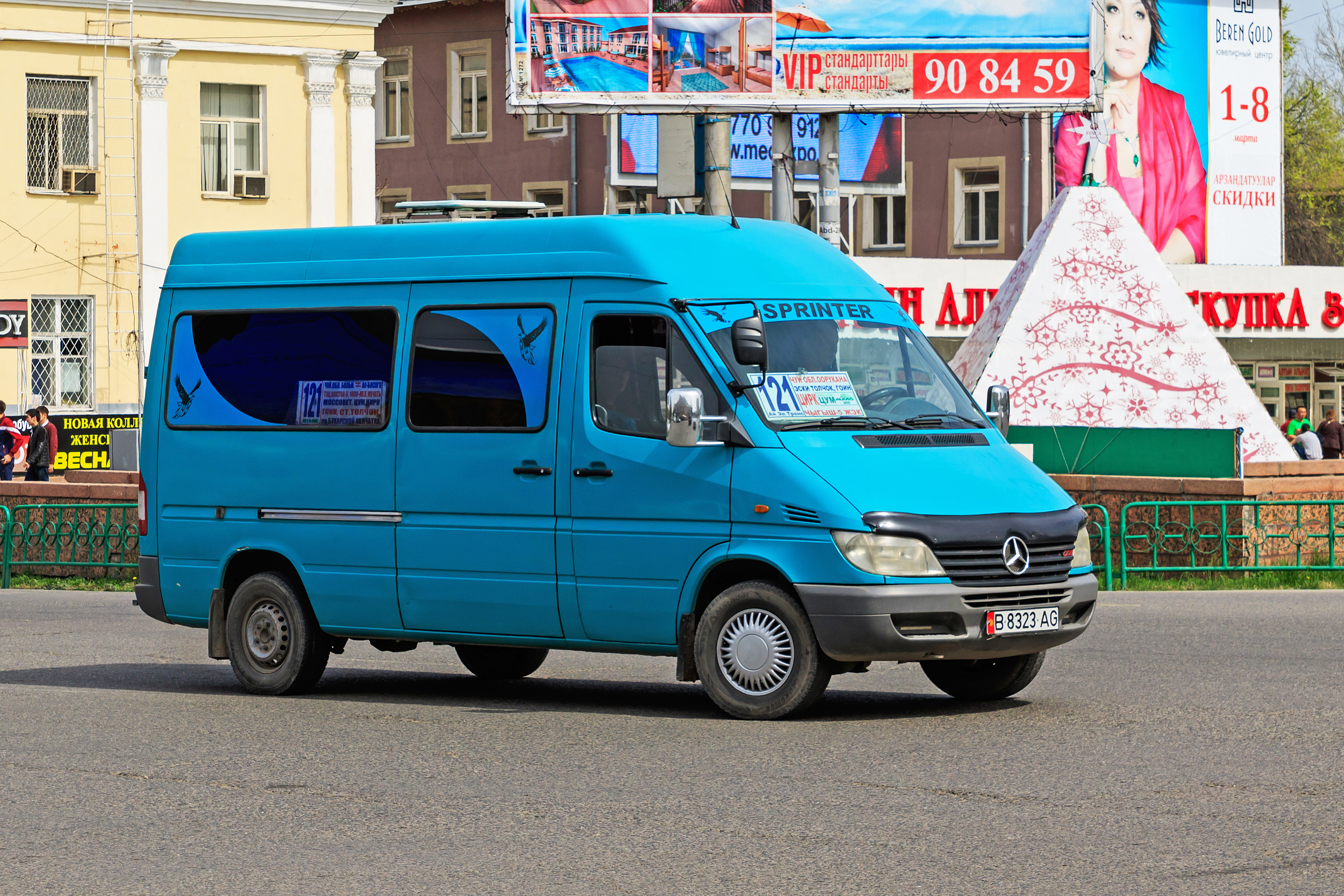
Marshrutka in Bishkek

Transport in Kyrgyzstan is severely constrained by the country's alpine topography. Roads have to snake up steep valleys, cross passes of 3,000 metres (9,800 ft) altitude and more, and are subject to frequent mudslides and snow avalanches. Winter travel is treacherous in many of the more remote and high-altitude regions.

Additional problems come from the fact that many roads and railway lines built during the Soviet period are today intersected by international boundaries, requiring time-consuming border formalities to cross where they are not completely closed. Horses are still a much-used transport option, especially in more rural areas; the road infrastructure is not extensive, so horses are able to reach locations that motor vehicles cannot, and they do not require expensive, imported fuel.

==== Airports ====
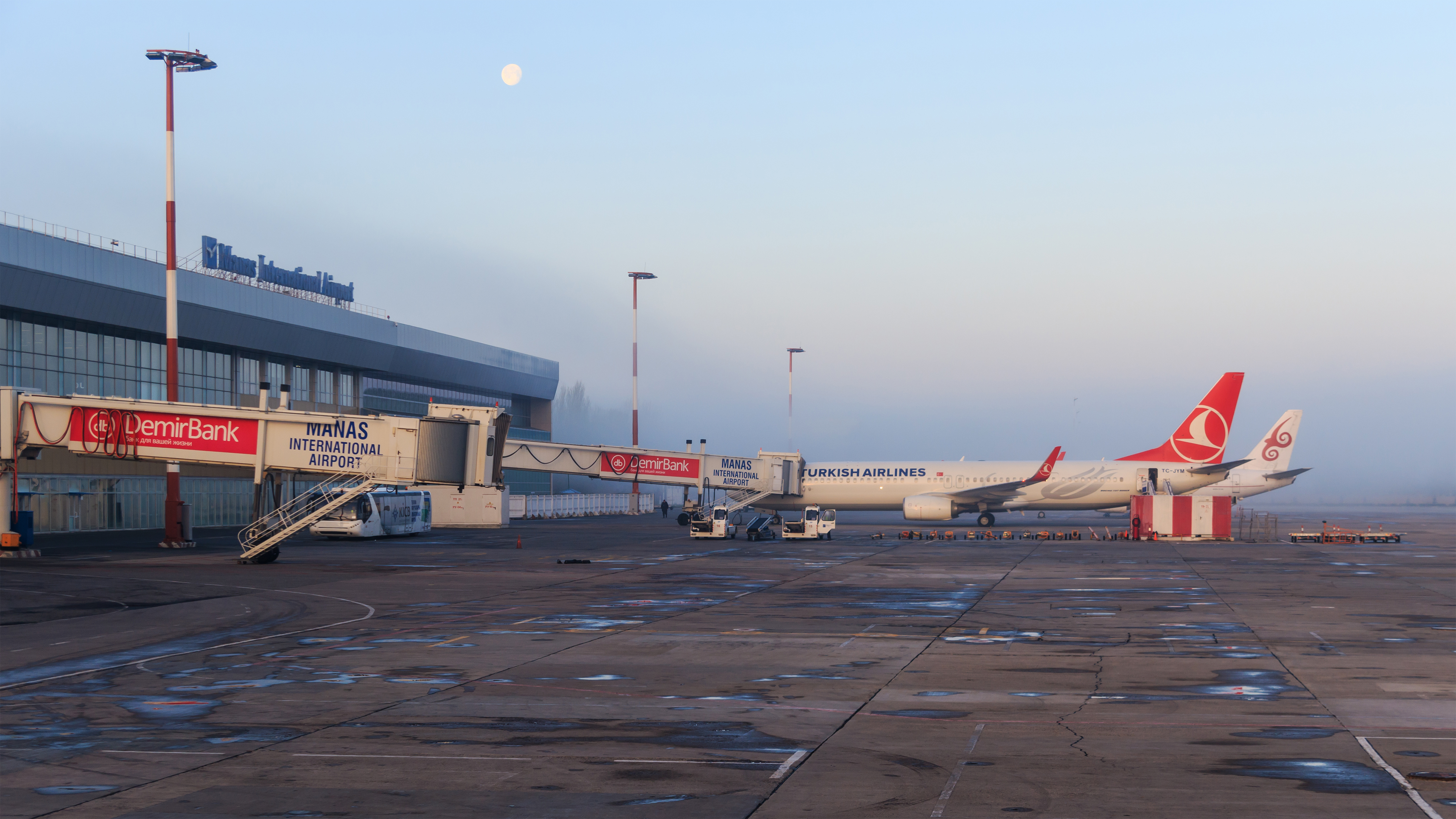
Manas International Airport

At the end of the Soviet period there were about 50 airports and airstrips, many of them built primarily to serve military purposes in this border region so close to China. Only a few of them remain in service today. The Kyrgyzstan Air Company provides air transport to China, Russia, and other local countries.

- Manas International Airport near Bishkek is the main international airport, with services to Moscow, Tashkent, Almaty, Ürümqi, Istanbul, Baku, and Dubai.
- Osh Airport is the main air terminal in the south of the country, with daily connections to Bishkek, and services to Moscow, Krasnoyarsk, Almaty and more international places.
- Jalal-Abad Airport is linked to Bishkek by daily flights. The national flag carrier, Kyrgyzstan, operates flights on BAe-146 aircraft. During the summer months, a weekly flight links Jalal-Abad with the Issyk-Kul Region.
- Other facilities built during the Soviet era are either closed down, used only occasionally or restricted to military use (e.g., Kant Air Base near Bishkek, which is used by the Russian Air Force).

==== Banned airline status ====
Until 8 June 2026, Kyrgyzstan appeared on the European Union's list of prohibited countries for the certification of airlines. This meant that no airline that was registered in Kyrgyzstan could operate services of any kind within the European Union, due to safety standards that failed to meet European regulations.

==== Railways ====
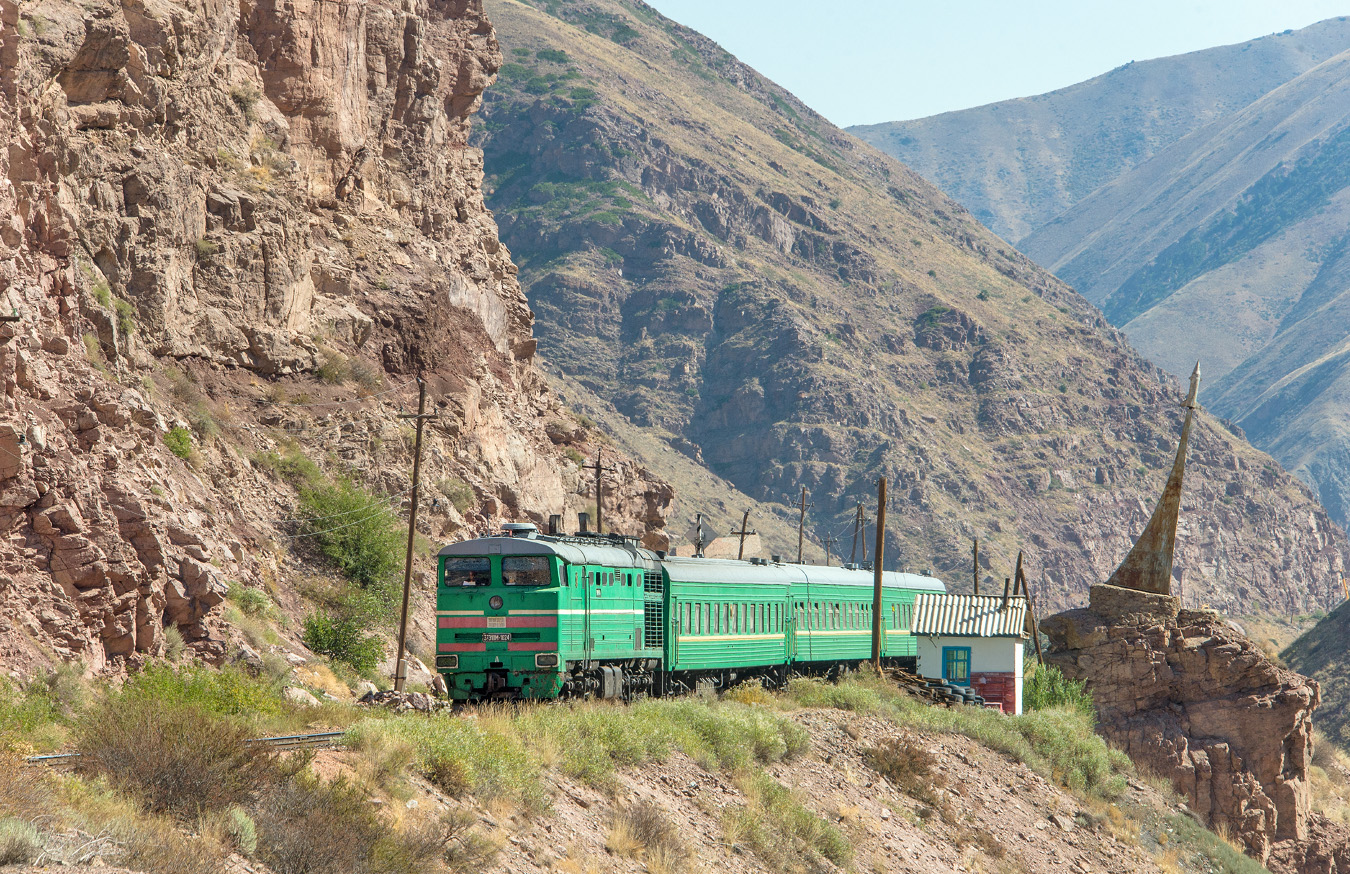
A train passing through the Chüy Valley

The Chüy Valley in the north and the Fergana Valley in the south were endpoints of the Soviet Union's rail system in Central Asia. Following the emergence of independent post-Soviet states, the rail lines which were built without regard for administrative boundaries have been cut by borders, and traffic is therefore severely curtailed. Limited rail lines within Kyrgyzstan, about 370 km (230 mi) (1,520 mm (59.8 in) broad gauge) in total, have little economic value in the absence of the former bulk traffic over long distances to and from such centres as Tashkent, Almaty, and the cities of Russia.

In 2022, construction began on a new 186 km extension of the existing railway from Balykchy to Karakeche, primarily meant to carry coal from mines at Karakeche to Bishkek. In June 2023, a railway between Balykchy and Bishkek was officially opened.

The planned construction of a 523 km China–Kyrgyzstan–Uzbekistan railway was announced in 2022, comprising 213 km (132 mi) in China, 260 km (162 mi) in Kyrgyzstan and 50 km (31 mi) in Uzbekistan. The railway, conceived as part of China's Belt and Road Initiative, is planned to lead from Kashgar through the Torugart Pass to Jalal-Abad, and further on to the Uzbek city of Andijan. The planned opening is 2030.

Neighboring country	Rail linked?	Rail link name	Rail gauge notes
Kazakhstan	Yes	Bishkek branch	Same gauge
Uzbekistan	Yes	Osh branch	Same gauge
Tajikistan	No	—	Same gauge
China	No	—	Gauge break: 1524 mm vs. 1435 mm

==== Highways ====
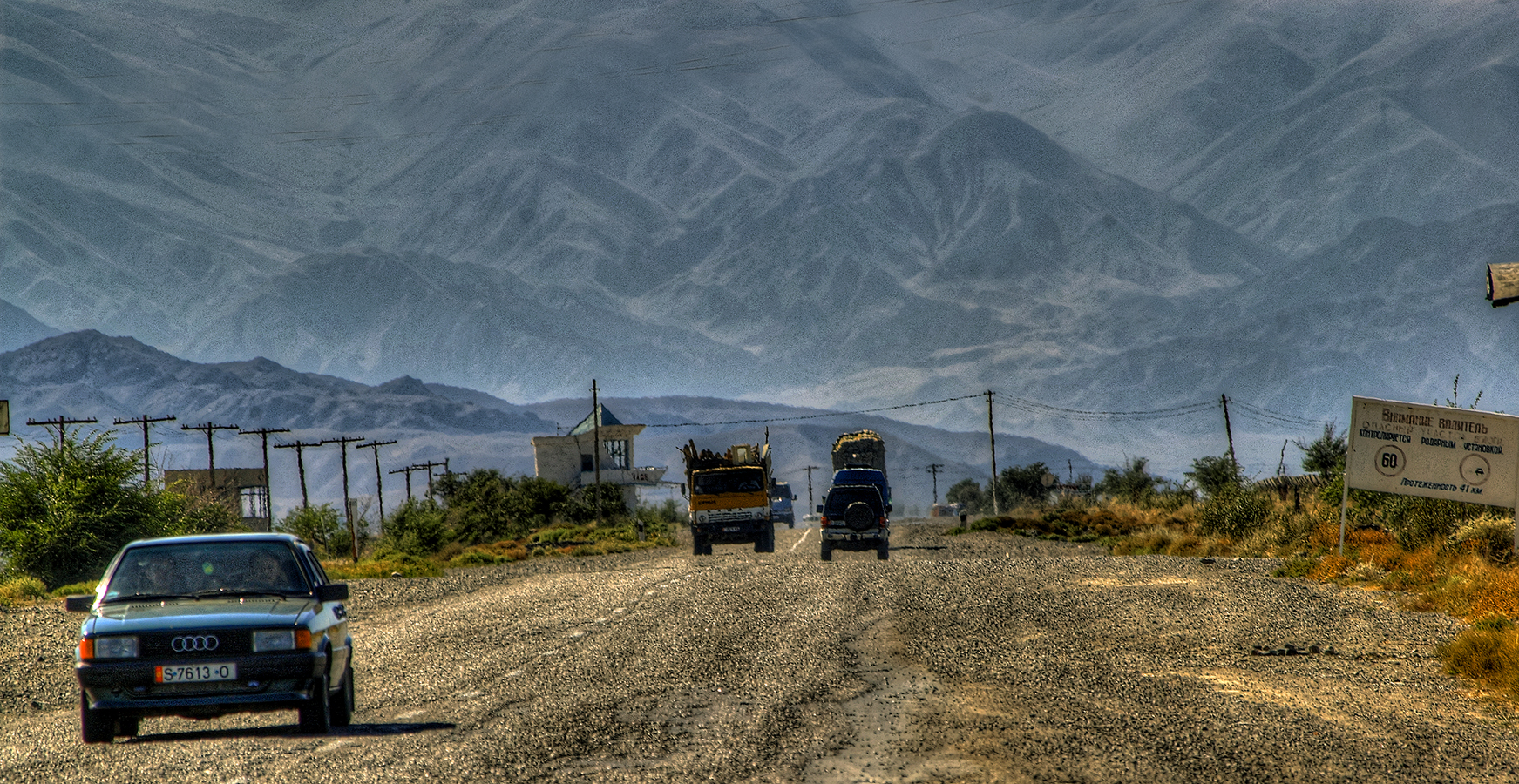
Highway A363 Bishkek towards Balykchy, Lake Issyk-Kul and Chinese border (Xinjiang)

With support from the Asian Development Bank, a major road linking the north and southwest via Bishkek to Osh has recently been completed. This considerably eases communication between the two major population centres. An offshoot of this road branches off across a 3,500-meter pass into the Talas Valley in the northwest. Plans are being formulated to build a major road from Osh into China.

- total: 34,000 km (21,127 mi) (including 140 km (87 mi) of expressways)
- paved: 22,600 km (14,043 mi) (includes some all-weather gravel-surfaced roads)
- unpaved: 7,700 km (4,785 mi) (these roads are made of unstabilized earth and are difficult to negotiate in wet weather) (1990)

==== Ports and harbours ====
- Balykchy (Ysyk-Kol or Rybach'ye) on Issyk Kul Lake.

== Demographics ==
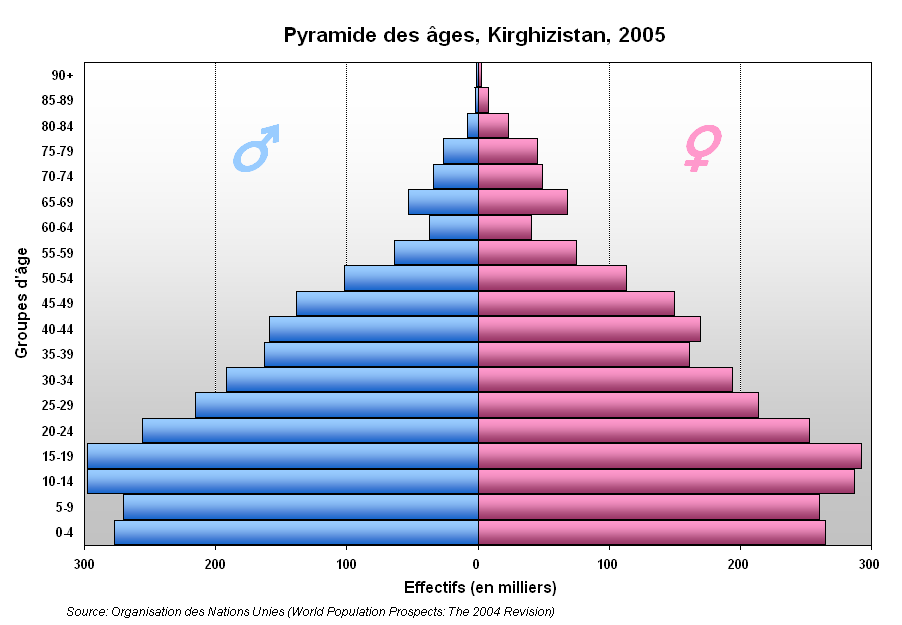
A population pyramid showing Kyrgyzstan's age distribution (2005)

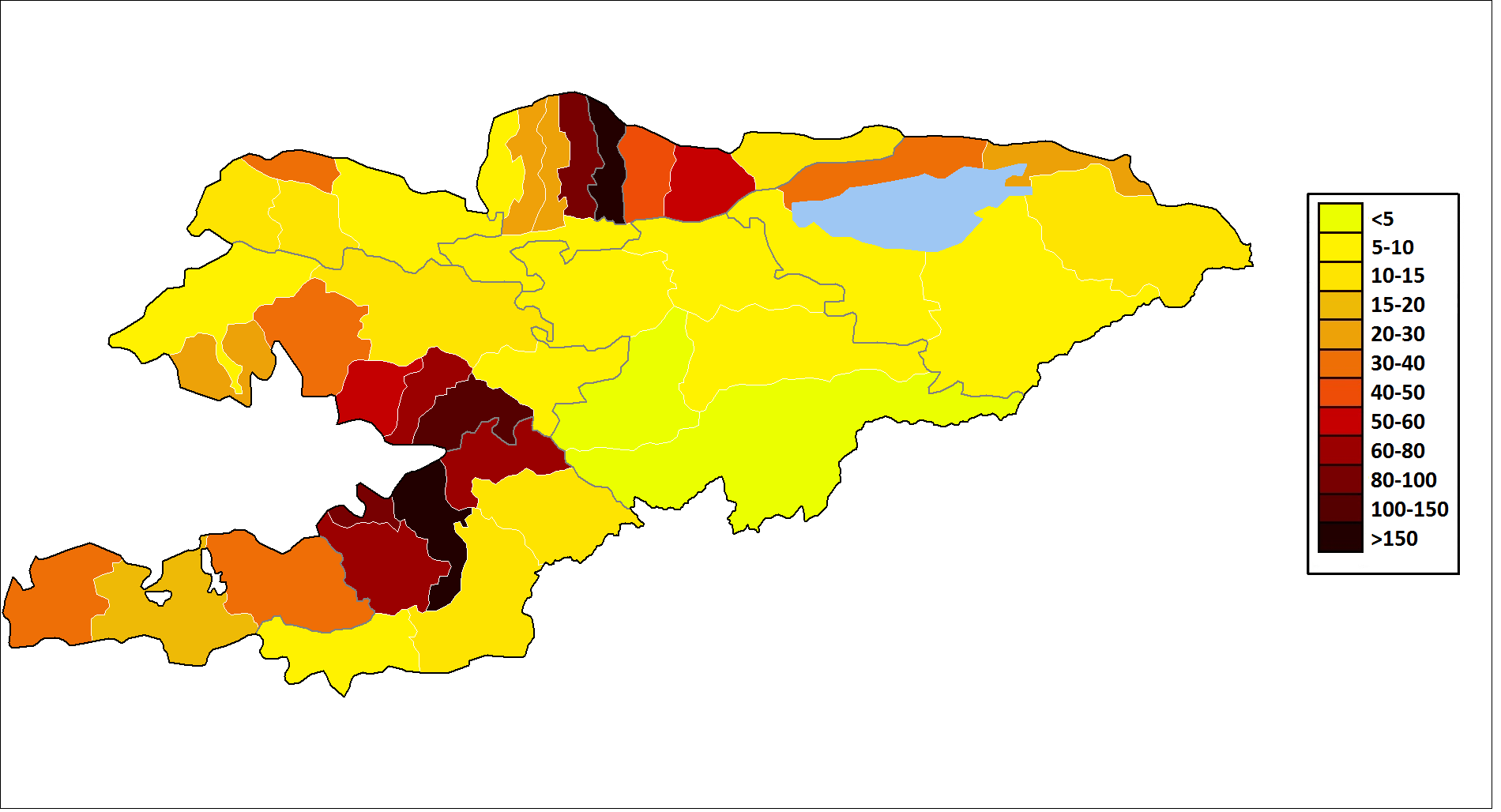
Population density (people per km^{2}) of Kyrgyzstan, 2015

The population is estimated at 7,404,300 as of January 2026. In the 2024 Global Hunger Index (GHI), Kyrgyzstan has a score of 6.8, ranking 36th among 127 countries with sufficient data. The hunger level is classified as low.

=== Urban centres ===
Largest cities or towns in Kyrgyzstan
Rank	Name	Region	Pop.
1	Bishkek	Bishkek	1,368,600
2	Osh	Osh Region	488,500
3	Jalalabat	Jalal-Abad Region	189,202
4	Karakol	Issyk-Kul Region	91,524
5	Tokmok	Chüy Region	77,164
6	Özgön	Osh Region	67,003
7	Kyzyl-Kyya	Osh Region	66,081
8	Bazar-Qorghon	Jalal-Abad Region	62,694
9	Kara-Balta	Chüy Region	61,364
10	Kara-Suu	Osh Region	58,159

=== Ethnic groups ===
The nation's largest ethnic group are the Kyrgyz, a Turkic people, who comprise 77.8% of the population. Other ethnic groups include the Russians (3.7%) concentrated in the north and the Uzbeks (14.3%) living in the south. Small but noticeable minorities include the Dungans (1.0%), Tajiks (0.9%), Uyghurs (0.5%), Kazakhs (0.4%), and other smaller ethnic minorities. The country has over 80 ethnic groups.

The Kyrgyz have historically been semi-nomadic herders, living in round tents called yurts and tending sheep, horses and yaks. This nomadic tradition continues to function seasonally as herding families return to the high mountain pasture (or jailoo) in the summer. The sedentary Uzbeks and Tajiks traditionally have farmed lower-lying irrigated land in the Fergana Valley.

Kyrgyzstan has undergone a pronounced change in its ethnic composition since independence. The percentage of ethnic Kyrgyz has increased from around 50% in 1979 to over 70% in 2013, while the percentage of ethnic groups, such as Russians, Ukrainians, Germans and Tatars dropped from 35% to about 7%. Since 1991, a large number of Germans, who in 1989 numbered 101,000 persons, have emigrated to Germany.

Population of Kyrgyzstan according to ethnic group 1926–2025
		Kyrgyz	Uzbeks	Russians	Ukrainians
1926 census	Number	661,171	110,463	116,436	64,128
1926 census	%	66.6%	11.1%	11.7%	6.5%
1959 census	Number	836,831	218,640	623,562	137,031
1959 census	%	40.5%	10.6%	30.2%	6.6%
1989 census	Number	2,229,663	550,096	916,558	108,027
1989 census	%	52.4%	12.9%	21.5%	2.5%
1999 census	Number	3,128,147	664,950	603,201	50,442
1999 census	%	64.9%	13.8%	12.5%	1.0%
2009 census	Number	3,804,788	768,405	419,583	21,924
2009 census	%	70.9%	14.3%	7.8%	0.4%
2022 census	Number	5,379,020	986,881	282,777	3,875
2022 census	%	77.6%	14.2%	4.1%	0.1%
2026 estimate	Number	5,763,000	1,061,800	270,200	
2026 estimate	%	77.8%	14.3%	3.7%	0.0%

=== Languages ===
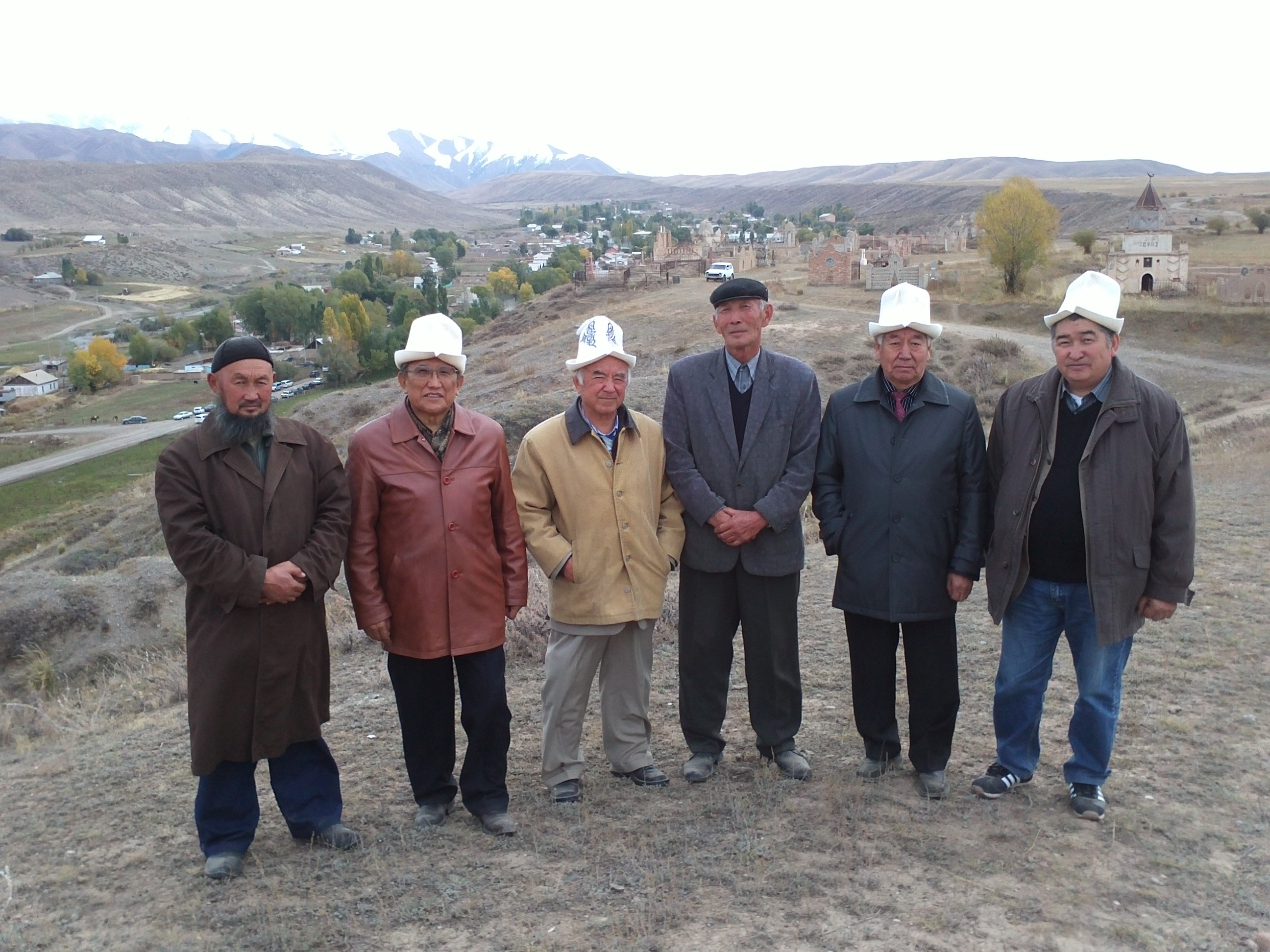
Kyrgyz writer Kenesh Jusupov and General Beishe Moldogaziev with villagers, On-Archain, Naryn Region

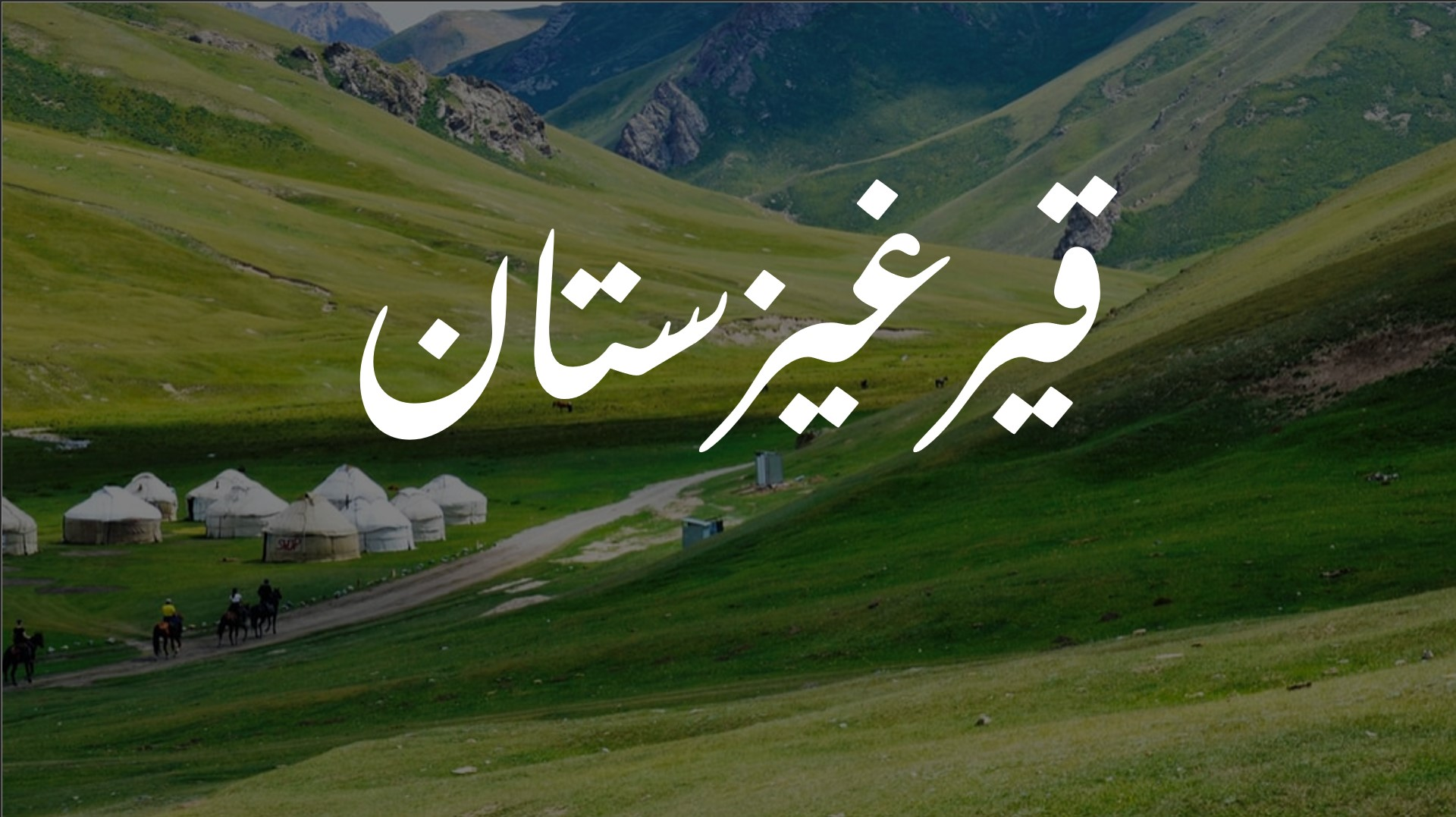
The name of Kyrgyzstan rendered in the traditional script in use from the 13th century to 1920

Kyrgyz is the state language. Russian is additionally an official language. Kyrgyzstan is one of five former Soviet republics to have Russian as a de jure official language, along with Russia, Belarus, Kazakhstan, and Tajikistan.

Kyrgyz is a Turkic language of the Kipchak branch, closely related to Kazakh, Karakalpak, and Nogay Tatar. It was written in the Arabic alphabet until the 20th century. The Latin script was introduced and adopted on Stalin's orders in 1928, and was subsequently replaced by Cyrillic script in 1941. A reformed Perso-Arabic alphabet, created by the Kyrgyz intellectual and scientist Kasym Tynystanov, is the official script of the Kyrgyz language in the People's Republic of China. As a result of the pending language reform in neighboring Kazakhstan, Kyrgyzstan will be the only independent Turkic-speaking country in a few years that exclusively uses the Cyrillic alphabet.

In April 2023, Russia suspended dairy exports to Kyrgyzstan after the chairman of Kyrgyzstan's National Commission for the State Language and Language Policies, Kanybek Osmonaliev, proposed to change the official script from Cyrillic to Latin to bring the country in line with other Turkic-speaking nations. Osmonaliev was reprimanded by President Sadyr Japarov who then clarified that Kyrgyzstan had no plans to replace the Cyrillic alphabet.

Russian television media enjoy enormous popularity in Kyrgyzstan, especially in Bishkek and the Chüy Region, despite the percentage of Russians today being a fraction of that in 1989. According to World Values Survey in 2020, Russian was the language spoken at home for 55.6% of the population of Bishkek, and Kyrgyz was the second with 43.6%. However, the countrywide figure for Russian was only 16.3%, whereas Kyrgyz was the home language of 70.9%. The Uzbek language was the third most spoken home language with 10.7% according to the same survey. Russian media outlets have an enormous influence on public opinion in Kyrgyzstan, especially in areas such as human rights and international political developments.

Many business and political affairs are carried out in Russian. Until recently, Kyrgyz remained a language spoken at home and was rarely used during meetings or other events. However, most parliamentary meetings today are conducted in Kyrgyz, with simultaneous interpretation available for those not speaking Kyrgyz. According to an RFE/RL article from 2014, despite the attempts to raise the status of Kyrgyz, thousands of Kyrgyz are russifying their names every year (around 40,000), mostly for career prospects, and to remove themselves from the Russian blacklists (people who are to be deported upon entrance) by registering different names. There are also many Russian-language medium schools that are supported from the Russian foundations via the embassy of Russia in Bishkek which are better funded than the Kyrgyz language medium schools. Due to this, many ethnic Kyrgyz go to Russian language medium schools. Many high school students change their surnames annually; for example, 800 such changes were recorded in high school students in the region of Naryn.

=== Religion ===
Religion in Kyrgyzstan (2017 estimate)
Islam	90%
Christianity	7%
Other	3%

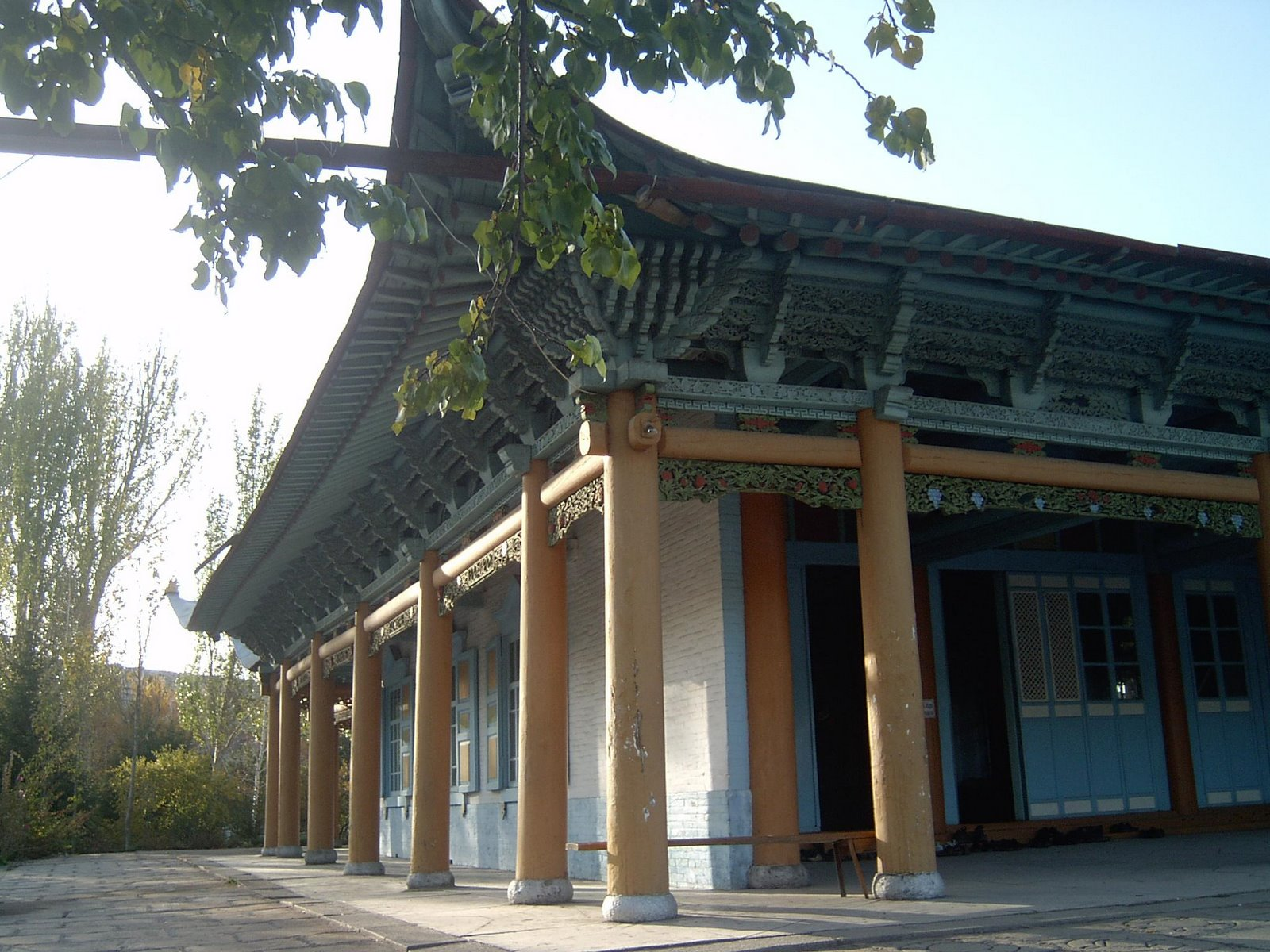
Karakol Dungan Mosque

Islam is the dominant religion in Kyrgyzstan. The CIA World Factbook estimates that as of 2017, 90% of the population is Muslim, with the majority being non-denominational and Sunni; 7% are Christian, including 3% Russian Orthodoxy, and the remainder are other religions. A 2009 Pew Research Center report indicates 86.3% of Kyrgyzstan's population adhering to Islam. The great majority of Muslims are Sunni, adhering to the Hanafi school of thought, although a 2012 Pew survey report showed that only 23% of respondents to a questionnaire chose to identify themselves as Sunni, with 64% volunteering that they were "just a Muslim". There are a few Ahmadiyya Muslims, though unrecognized by the country.

During Soviet times, state atheism was encouraged. Today, however, Kyrgyzstan is a secular state, although Islam has exerted a growing influence in politics. For instance, there has been an attempt to arrange for officials to travel on hajj (the pilgrimage to Mecca) under a tax-free arrangement.

While Islam in Kyrgyzstan is more of a cultural background than a devout daily practice for many, public figures have expressed support for restoring religious values. For example, human rights ombudsman Tursunbay Bakir-Ulu notes, "In this era of independence, it is not surprising that there has been a return to spiritual roots not only in Kyrgyzstan, but also in other post-communist republics. It would be immoral to develop a market-based society without an ethical dimension."

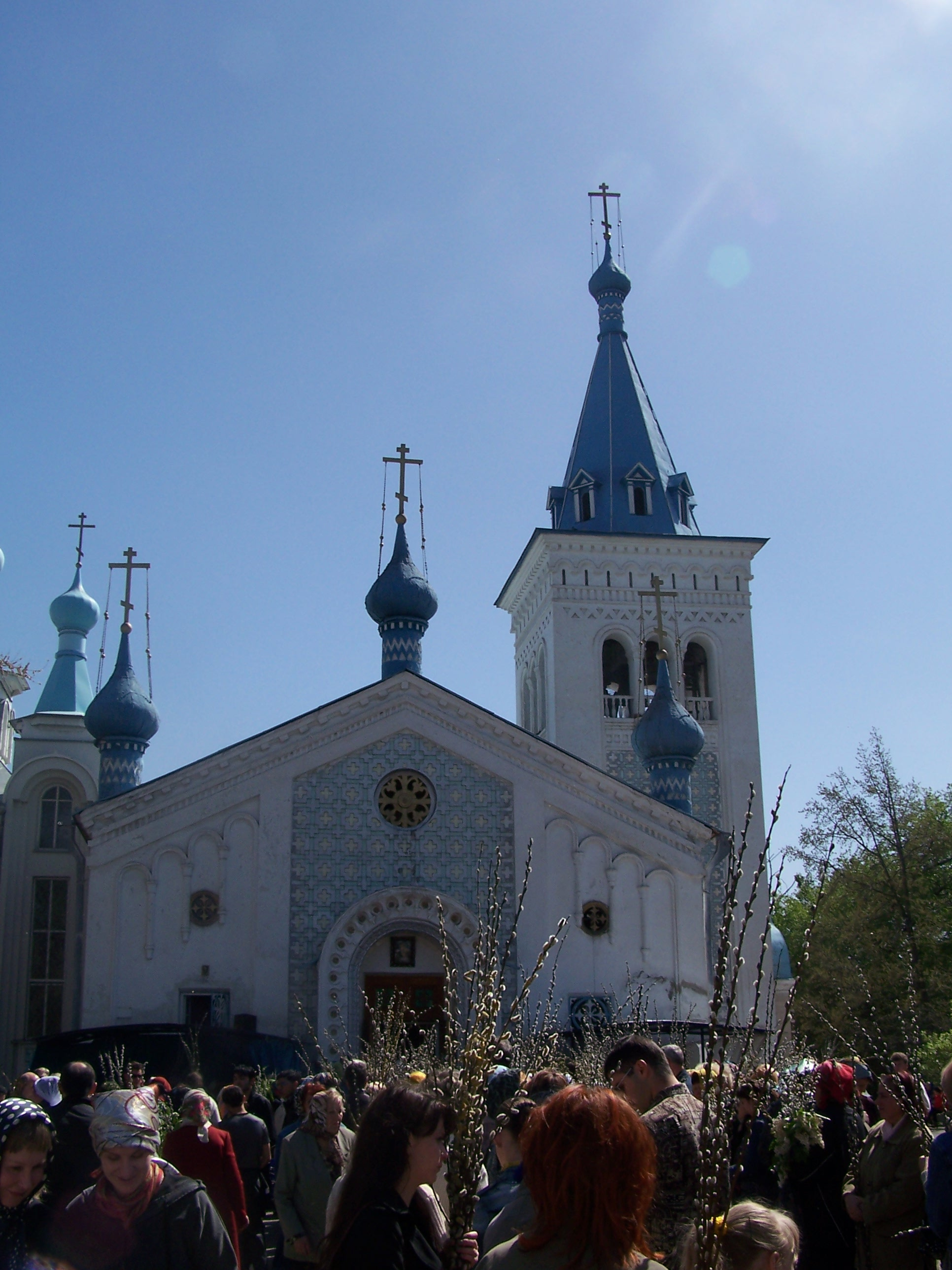
Bishkek Eastern Orthodox Church

Bermet Akayeva, the daughter of former President Askar Akayev, stated during a July 2007 interview that Islam is increasingly taking root across the nation. She emphasized that many mosques have recently been built and that the Kyrgyz are increasingly devoting themselves to Islam, which she noted was "not a bad thing in itself. It keeps our society more moral, cleaner." There is a contemporary Sufi order present which adheres to a somewhat different form of Islam than orthodox Islam.

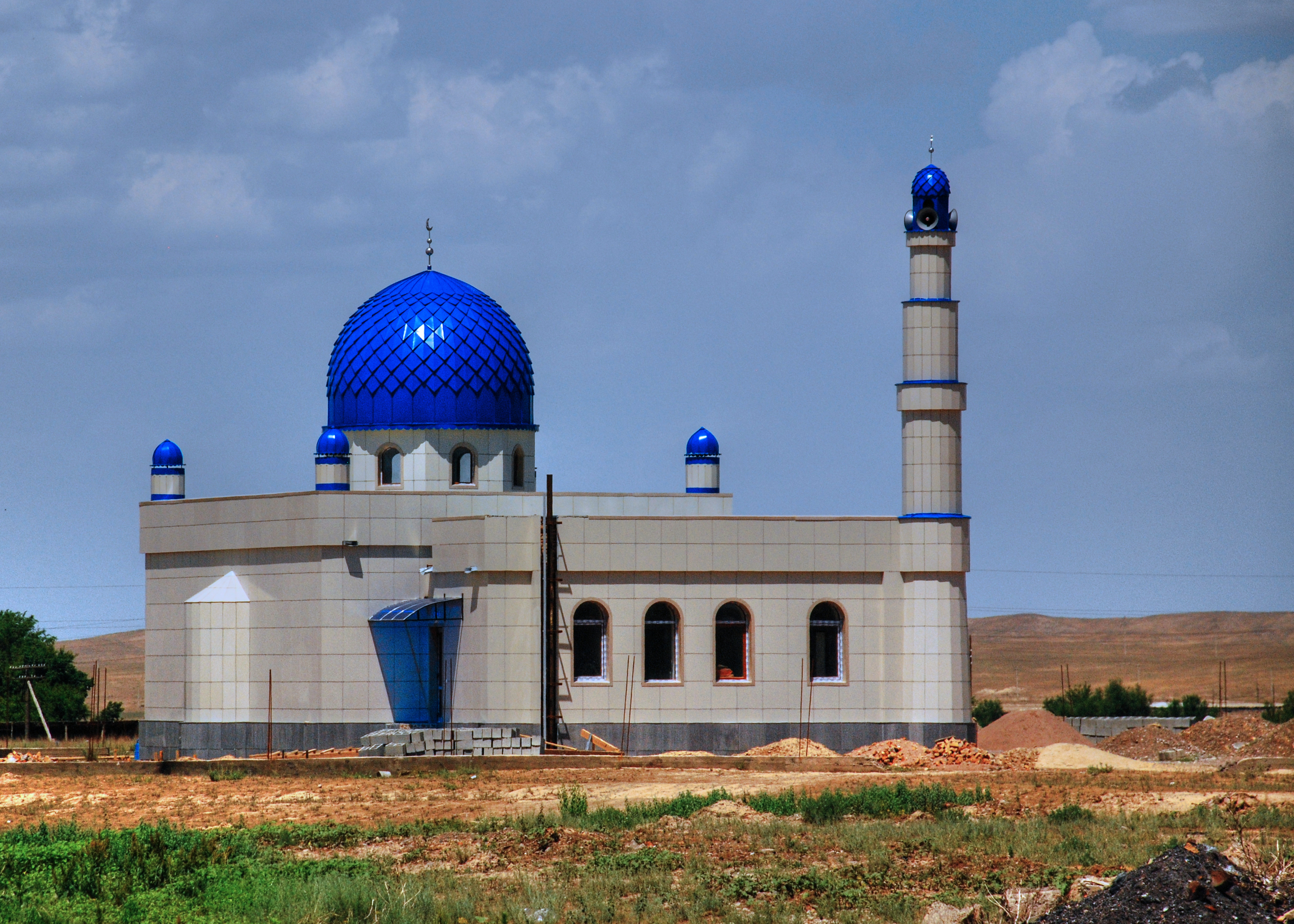
Mosque under construction in Kyrgyzstan

The other faiths practiced in Kyrgyzstan include Russian Orthodox and Ukrainian Orthodox versions of Christianity, practiced primarily by Russians and Ukrainians respectively. A small minority of ethnic Germans are also Christian, mostly Lutheran and Anabaptist, and there is a Roman Catholic community of approximately 600. As part of the historic Kyrgyzstan German minority, there were around 200 Mennonites in Kyrgyzstan in 2022. One Mennonite community continues in the settlement of Rot-Front. A community of 5,000 to 10,000 Jehovah's Witnesses gathers in both Kyrgyz and Russian-speaking congregations and some Chinese- and Turkish-speaking groups.

A few animistic traditions survive, as do influences from Buddhism such as the tying of prayer flags onto sacred trees, though some view this practice as rooted within Sufi Islam. There is also a small number of Bukharian Jews living in Kyrgyzstan, but during the collapse of the Soviet Union most fled to other countries, mainly the United States and Israel. In addition, there is a small community of Ashkenazi Jews, who fled to the country from eastern Europe during the Second World War.

In 2009 a law went into effect increasing the minimum number of adherents for recognizing a religion from 10 to 200. It also outlawed "aggressive action aimed at proselytism", and banned religious activity in schools and all activity by unregistered organizations. There have been several reported police raids against peaceful minority religious meetings, as well as reports of officials planting false evidence, but also some court decisions in favour of religious minorities.

=== Education ===
Education in Kyrgyzstan includes primary (grades 1 to 4, some schools have optional 0 grade), secondary (grades 5 to 9) and high (grades 10 to 11) divisions within one school. Children are usually accepted to primary schools at the age of 6 or 7. It is required that every child finishes 9 grades of school and receives a certificate of completion. Grades 10–11 are optional, but it is necessary to complete them to graduate and receive a state-accredited school diploma. To graduate, a student must complete the 11-year school course and pass 4 mandatory state exams in writing, maths, history, and a foreign language.

As of 2023, there are 4,989 primary and secondary schools, including 445 in Bishkek; the large majority of these (4,537) are public schools. There are 58 higher educational institutions and universities, out of which 42 are public and 16 private.

In 2016, the University of Central Asia was launched in Naryn, Kyrgyzstan. There are also various Russian-language medium schools in Bishkek, Osh and other areas. Because of the better funding that they receive in comparation with Kyrgyz state schools, many Kyrgyz go there. In 2021 Russia announced its plans to create approximately 30 new Russian-language schools in Kyrgyzstan. Teachers from Russia are also working here. However, the existence of these schools has been criticised, for reasons such as the fact that Russian language education has flaws compared to the Turkish and American schools in the country, but also because many ethnic Kyrgyz born after Kyrgyz independence in 1991 can't speak Kyrgyz, but only Russian, according to a Bishkek resident.

==== Libraries ====
Kyrgyzstan is home to 1,066 libraries. The National Library of the Kyrgyz Republic is the oldest library in the country, which was established in 1934. Kyrgyz Libraries are working towards expanding access to communities, evident in projects such as the signing of the Marrakesh VIP Treaty and the Open access Portal.

== Culture ==
=== Traditions ===
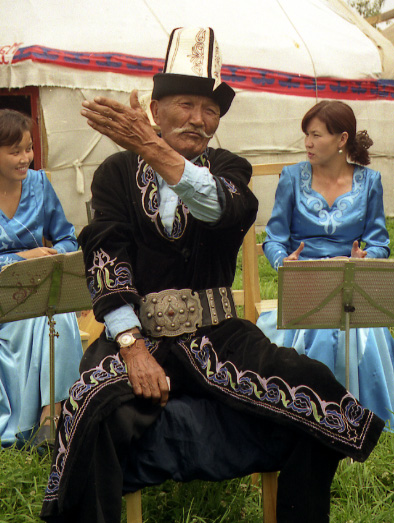
A Kyrgyz manaschi performing part of the Epic of Manas at a yurt camp in Karakol

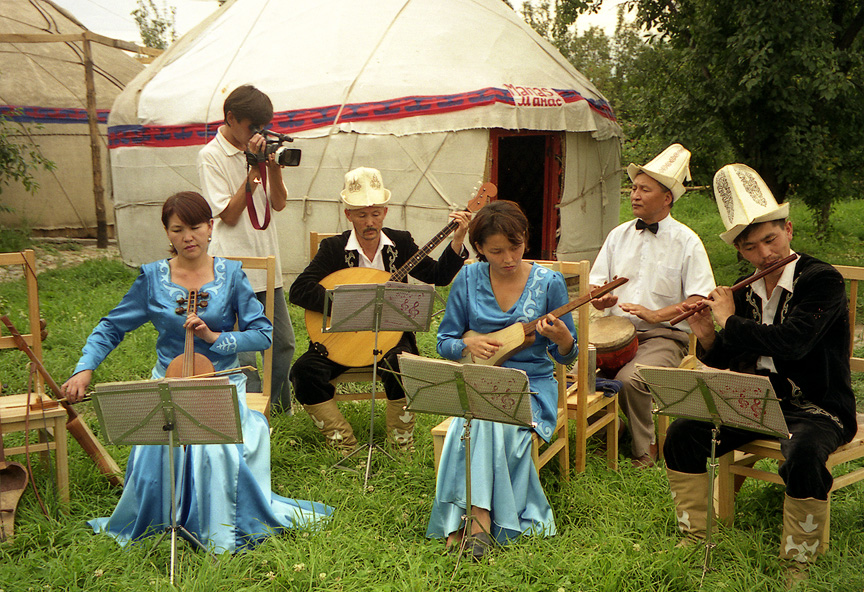
Musicians playing traditional Kyrgyz music

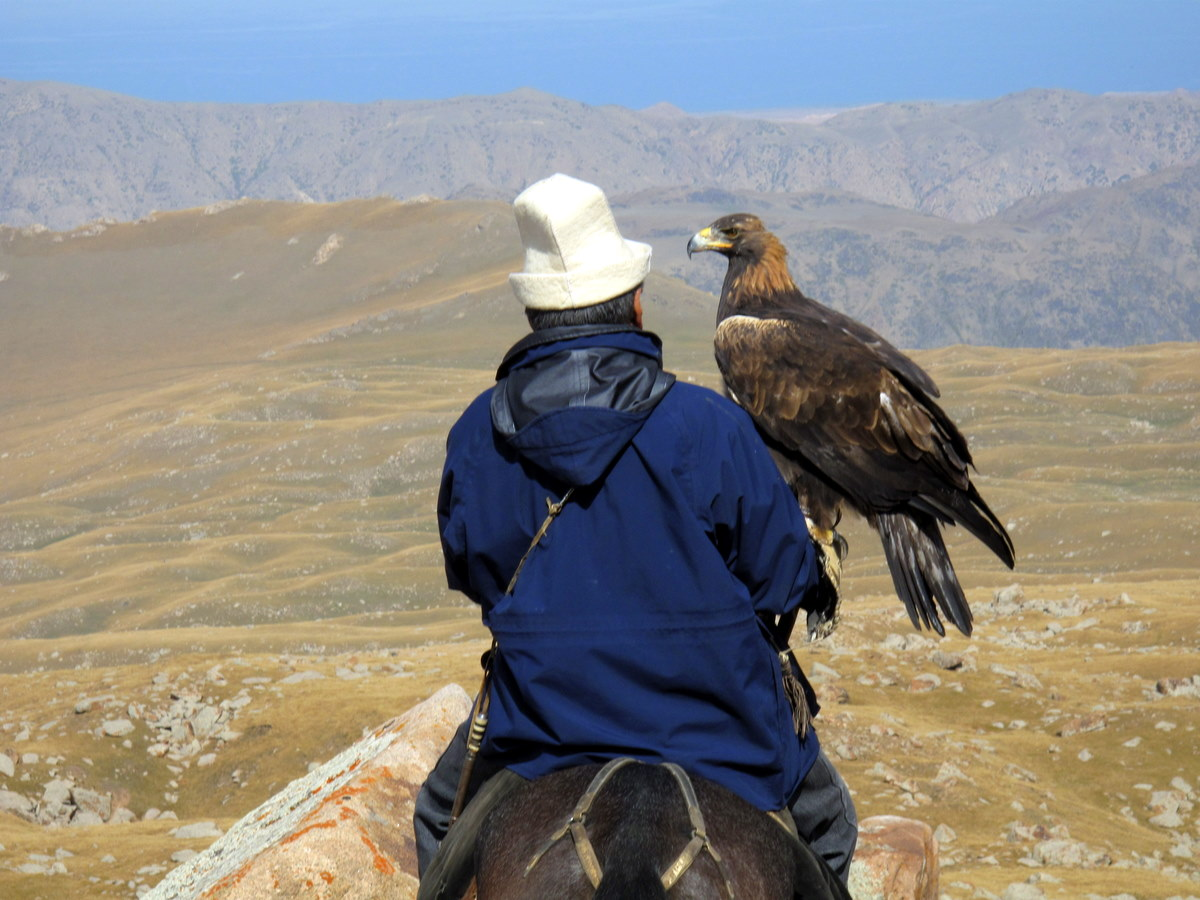
Hunting with an eagle

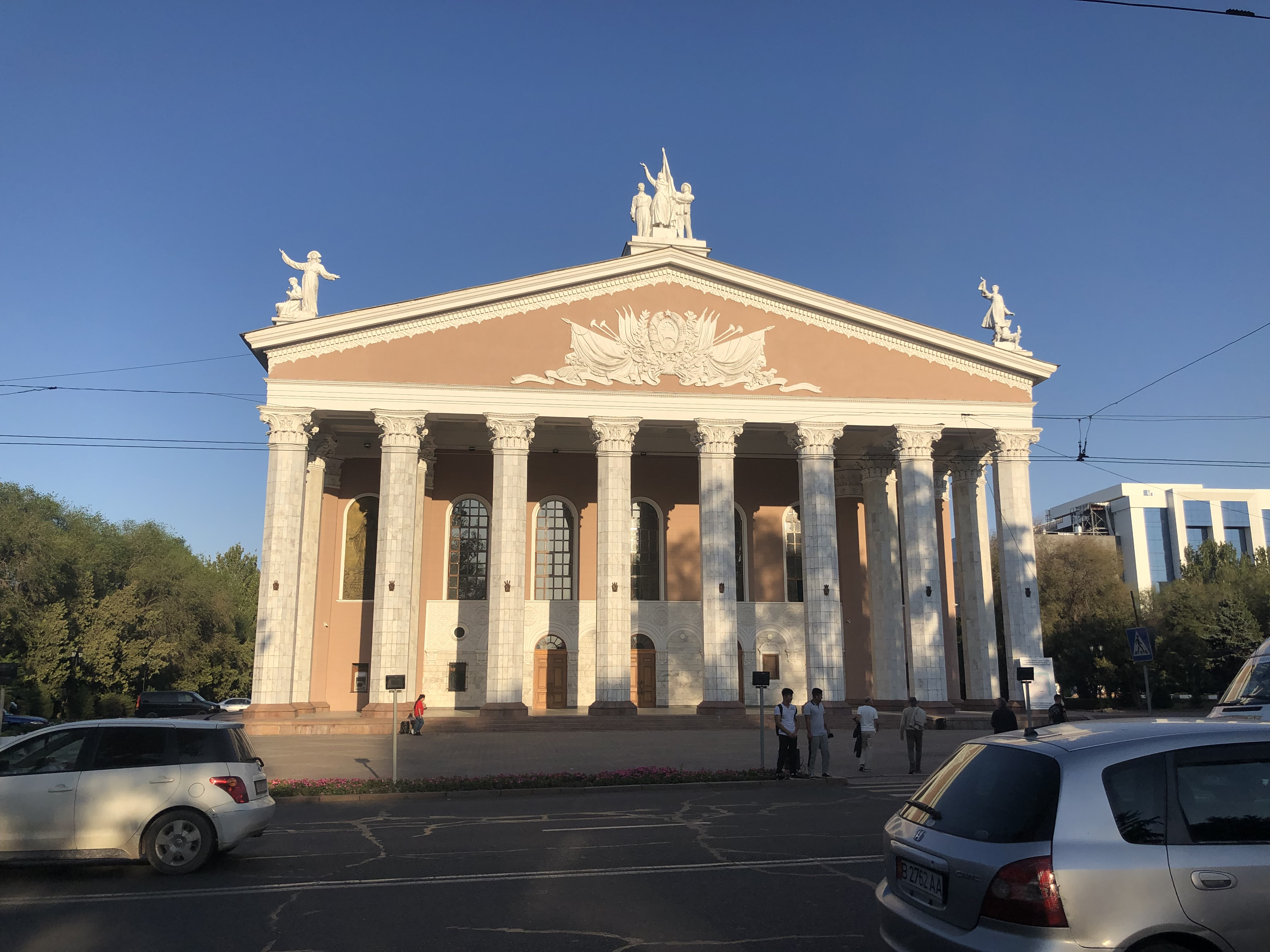
Kyrgyz Opera and Ballet Theatre, Bishkek

- Manas, an epic poem; the plot revolves around a series of events that coincide with the history of the region in the 9th century, primarily the interaction of the Kyrgyz people with other Turkic and Chinese people.
- Komuz, a three-stringed lute
- Tush kyiz, large, elaborately embroidered wall hangings
- Shyrdak and Ala-kiyiz carpets, manufactured by the process of felting, used for yurts. Inscribed in 2012 on the UNESCO List of Intangible Cultural Heritage in Need of Urgent Safeguarding.
- Other textiles, especially made from felt
- Ala kachuu, illegal but still practiced bride kidnapping. It is debatable whether bride kidnapping is actually traditional. Some of the confusion may stem from the fact that arranged marriages were traditional, and one of the ways to escape an arranged marriage was to arrange a consensual "kidnapping".
- Falconry
- Various dances

=== Flag ===
The 40-rayed yellow sun in the center of the national flag represent the 40 tribes that once made up the entirety of Kyrgyz culture before the intervention of Russia during the rise of the Soviet Union. The lines inside the sun represent the crown or tündük (Kyrgyz түндүк) of a yurt, a symbol replicated in many facets of Kyrgyz architecture. The red portion of the flag represents peace and openness of Kyrgyzstan.

Under Soviet rule and before 1992, it had the flag of the Soviet Union with two large blue stripes and a thin white stripe in the middle.

=== Sports ===
In the 2000 Summer Olympics in Sydney, Kyrgyzstan received its first ever Olympic medal when Aidyn Smagulov won bronze in the men's 60 kg competition final in judo.

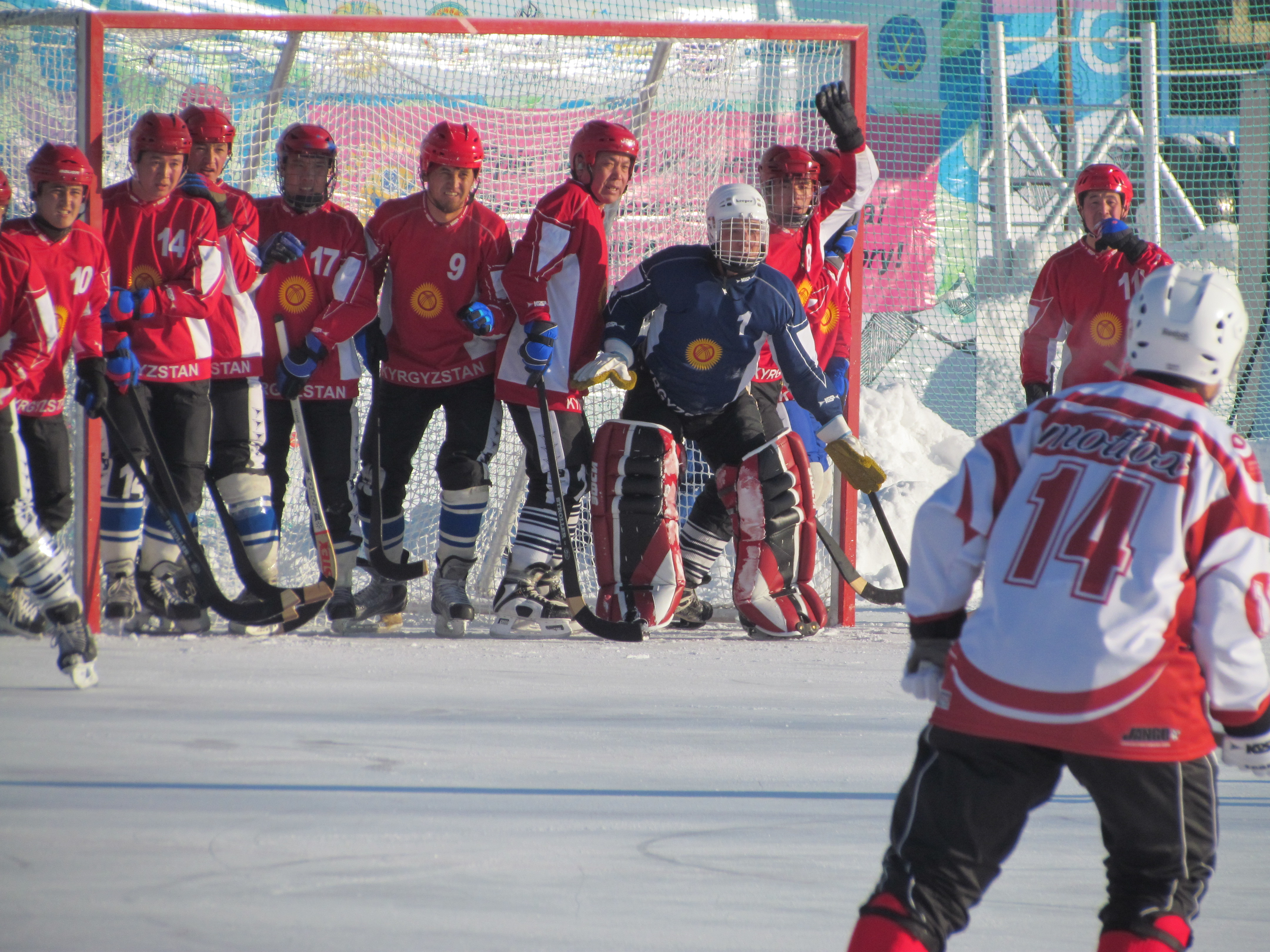
Bandy: Kyrgyzstan in red against Japan

Football is one of the most popular sports. The official governing body is the Football Federation of Kyrgyz Republic, which was founded in 1992. It administers the Kyrgyzstan national football team. Wrestling is popular. Since the 2008 Summer Olympic Games, Kyrgyzstani wrestlers have won six medals in Greco-Roman and freestyle wrestling: three in 2008 and three in 2020.

Ice hockey was not as popular until the first Ice Hockey Championship was organized in 2009. In 2011, the Kyrgyzstan men's national ice hockey team won 2011 Asian Winter Games Premier Division dominating in all six games with six wins. It was the first major international event that Kyrgyzstan's ice hockey team took part in. The Kyrgyzstan men's ice hockey team joined the IIHF in July 2011.

Bandy is becoming increasingly popular. The national team took Kyrgyzstan's first medal at the Asian Winter Games, when they captured the bronze. They played in the Bandy World Championship 2012, their first appearance in that tournament. Kyrgyzstan's national basketball team had its best performance at the official 1995 Asian Basketball Championship where the team finished ahead of favorites including Iran, Philippines and Jordan.

XXI International Issyk-Kul Sports Games was held in 9–17 September 2022 in Baktuu-Dolonotu. The first three World Nomad Games were held in Cholpon-Ata. The 6th International Sports Festival Pearl of Kyrgyzstan were held in Issyk-Kul region in 2022.

==== Horse riding ====
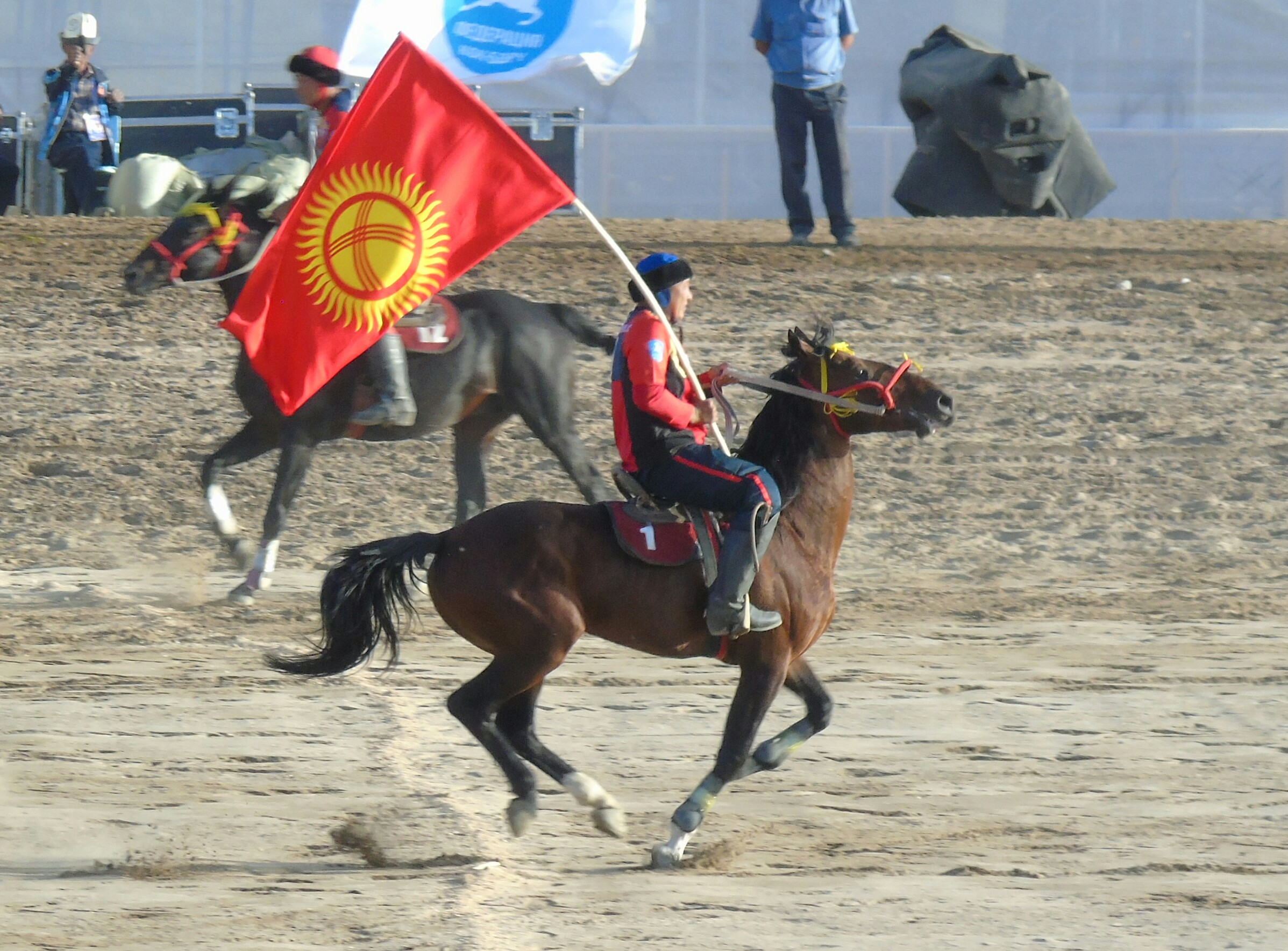
Ulak Tartysh

The traditional national sports reflect the importance of horse riding in Kyrgyz culture. Very popular, as in all of Central Asia, is Ulak Tartysh, a team game resembling a cross between polo and rugby in which two teams of riders wrestle for possession of the headless carcass of a goat, which they attempt to deliver across the opposition's goal line, or into the opposition's goal: a big tub or a circle marked on the ground.

Other popular games on horseback include:

- At Chabysh – a long-distance horse race, sometimes over a distance of more than 50 km
- Jumby Atmai – a large bar of precious metal (the "jumby") is tied to a pole by a thread and contestants attempt to break the thread by shooting at it, while at a gallop
- Kyz Kuumai – a man chases a girl to win a kiss from her, while she gallops away; if he is not successful she may in turn chase him and attempt to beat him with her "kamchi" (horsewhip)
- Oodarysh – two contestants wrestle on horseback, each attempting to be the first to throw the other from his horse
- Tyin Emmei – picking up a coin from the ground at full gallop

=== Public holidays ===
In addition to celebrating the New Year each 1 January, the Kyrgyz observe the traditional New Year festival Nowruz on the vernal equinox. This spring holiday is celebrated with feasts and festivities such as the horse game Ulak Tartish.

Public holidays in Kyrgyzstan:

- Movable holidays (determined by the Muslim calendar):
  - Orozo Ayt (Eid al-Fitr)
  - Qurman (or Qurban) Ayt (Eid al-Adha)
- 1 January – New Year's Day
- 7 January – Orthodox Christmas
- 23 February – Fatherland Defenders' Day
- 8 March – Women's Day
- 21–23 March – Nooruz Mairamy, Persian New Year (spring festival)
- 7 April – Day of National Revolution
- 1 May – Labor Day
- 5 May – Constitution Day
- 8 May – Remembrance Day
- 9 May – Victory Day
- 31 August – Independence Day
- 7–8 November – Days of History and Commemoration of Ancestors

== See also ==
- Outline of Kyrgyzstan
- Chinghiz Aitmatov
