= Outline of Kyrgyzstan =

Overview of and topical guide to Kyrgyzstan

The Flag of Kyrgyzstan

The Emblem of Kyrgyzstan

The location of Kyrgyzstan

An enlargeable map of the Kyrgyz Republic

The following outline is provided as an overview of and topical guide to Kyrgyzstan: Kyrgyzstan – sovereign country located in Central Asia. Landlocked and mountainous, Kyrgyzstan is bordered by Kazakhstan to the north, Uzbekistan to the west, Tajikistan to the southwest, and China to the east.

== General reference ==
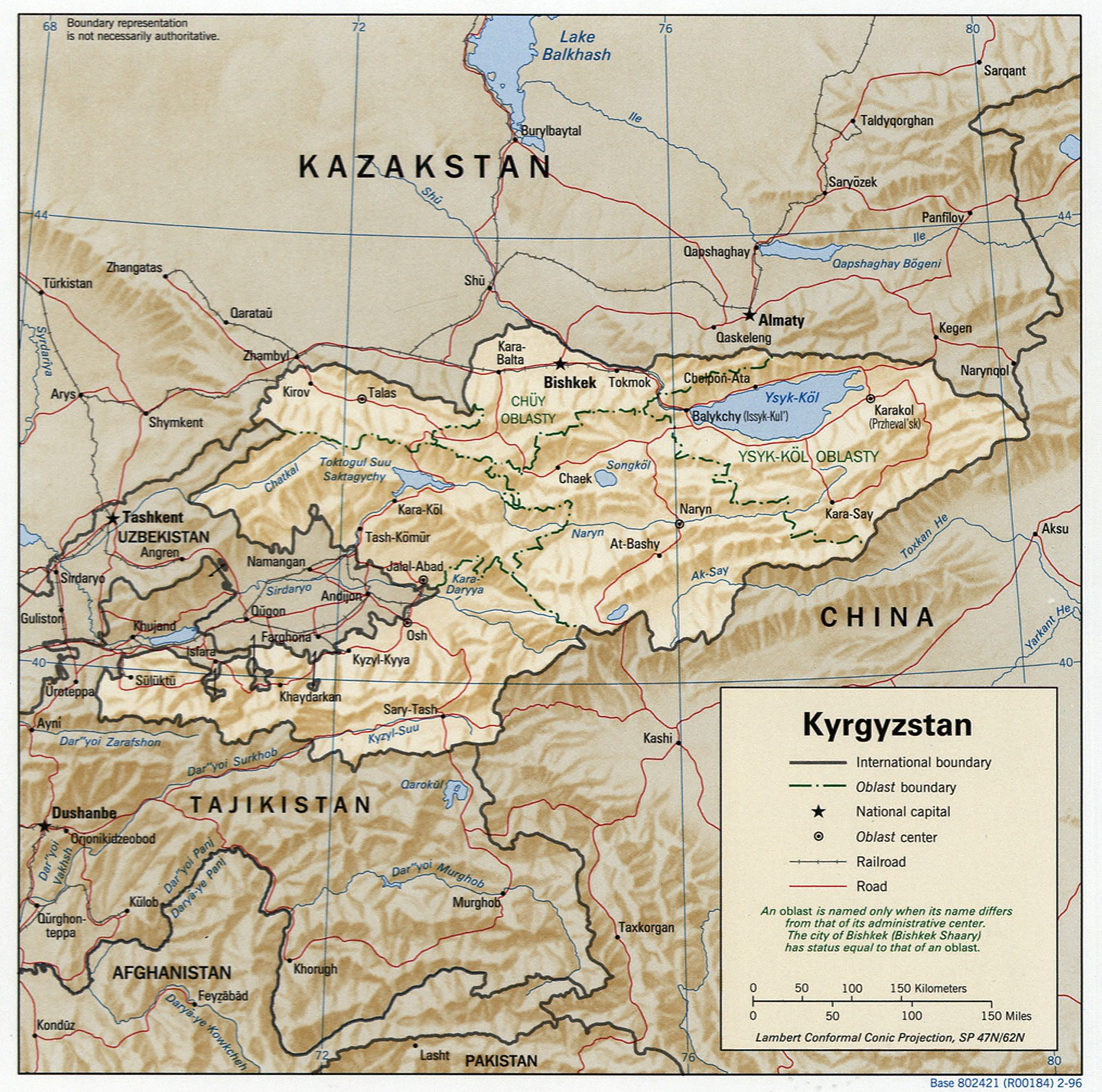
An enlargeable relief map of Kyrgyzstan

- Pronunciation:
- Common English country name: Kyrgyzstan
- Official English country name: The Kyrgyz Republic
- Adjectives: Kyrgyzstani, Kyrgyz, Kirgiz, Kirghiz
- Demonym(s):
- Etymology: Name of Kyrgyzstan
- ISO country codes: KG, KGZ, 417
- ISO region codes: See ISO 3166-2:KG
- Internet country code top-level domain: .kg

== Geography of Kyrgyzstan ==
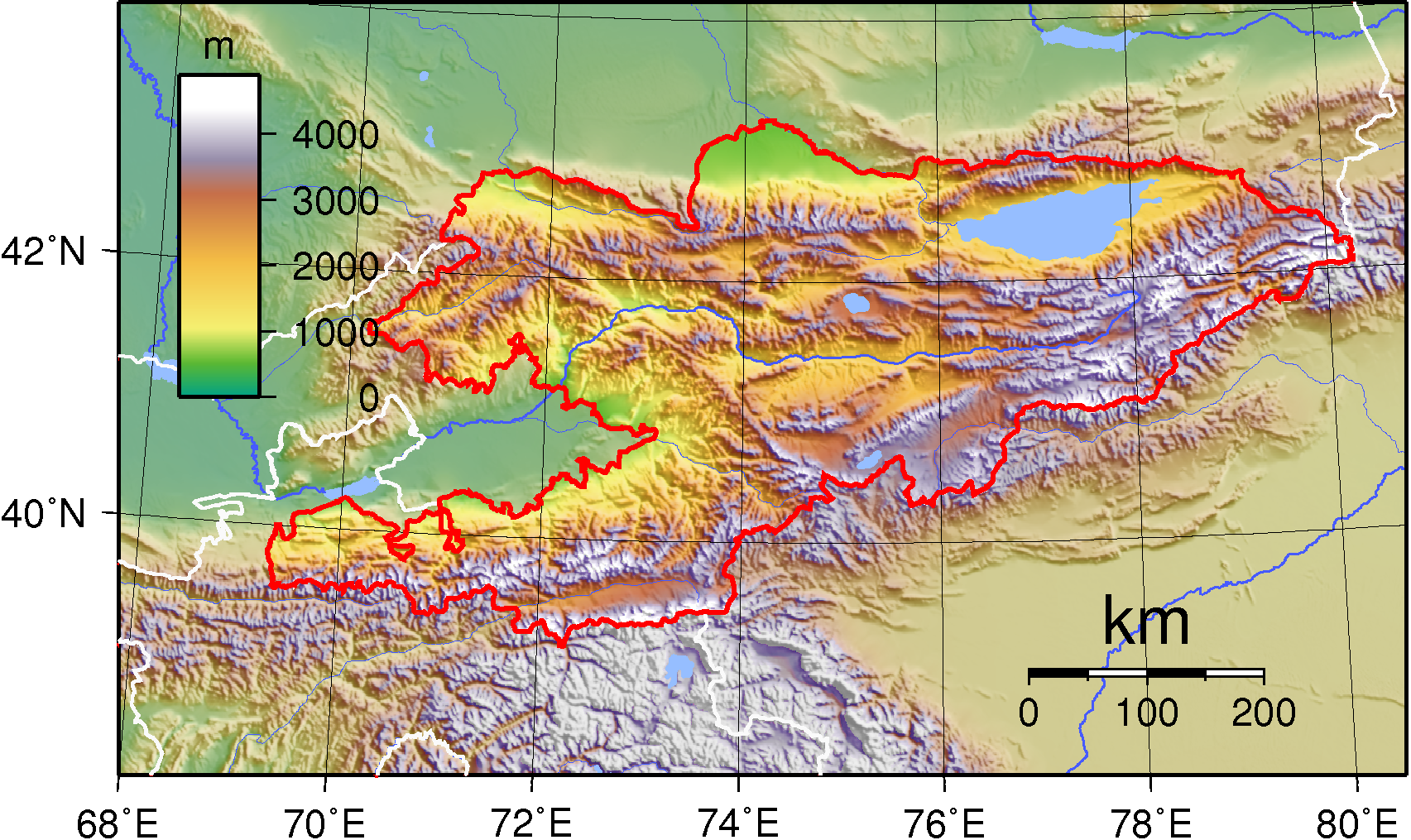
An enlargeable topographic map of Kyrgyzstan

Geography of Kyrgyzstan

- Kyrgyzstan is: a landlocked country
- Location:
  - Northern Hemisphere and Eastern Hemisphere
    - Eurasia
      - Asia
        - Central Asia
    - Time zone: UTC+06
  - Extreme points of Kyrgyzstan
    - High: Jengish Chokusu 7,439 m (24,406 ft)
    - Low: Kara Darya 132 m (433 ft)
  - Land boundaries: 3,051 km

Kazakhstan 653 mi (1,051 km)
Uzbekistan 683 mi (1,099 km)
Tajikistan 540 mi (870 km)
China 533 mi (858 km)

- Coastline: none

- Population of Kyrgyzstan: 5,317,000 - 111th most populous country
- Area of Kyrgyzstan: 199,900 km^{2}
- Atlas of Kyrgyzstan

=== Environment of Kyrgyzstan ===
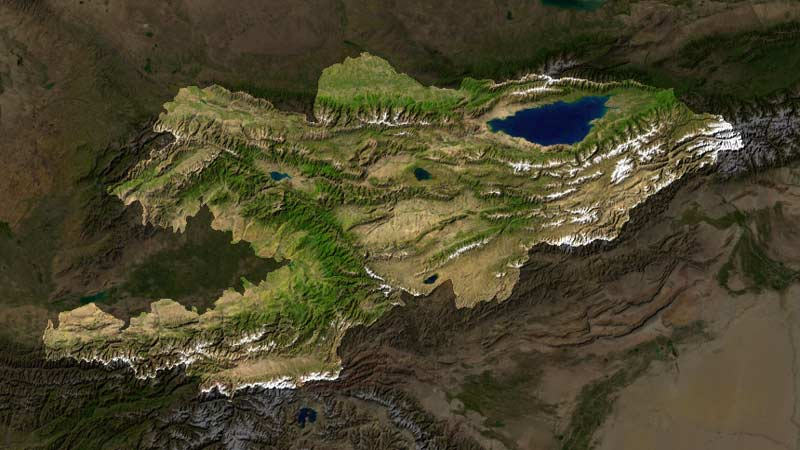
An enlargeable satellite image of Kyrgyzstan

Environment of Kyrgyzstan

- Climate of Kyrgyzstan
- Environmental issues in Kyrgyzstan
- List of protected areas of Kyrgyzstan
- Wildlife of Kyrgyzstan
  - Fauna of Kyrgyzstan
    - Birds of Kyrgyzstan
    - Mammals of Kyrgyzstan

==== Natural geographic features of Kyrgyzstan ====
- Mountain ranges of Kyrgyzstan
- Rivers of Kyrgyzstan
- Valleys of Kyrgyzstan
- List of mountain passes in Kyrgyzstan
- World Heritage Sites in Kyrgyzstan: None
- Kyrgyz Seismic Network

=== Regions of Kyrgyzstan ===
Regions of Kyrgyzstan

==== Ecoregions of Kyrgyzstan ====
List of ecoregions in Kyrgyzstan

==== Administrative division of Kyrgyzstan ====
Administrative divisions of Kyrgyzstan

- Regions of Kyrgyzstan
  - Districts of Kyrgyzstan

===== Regions of Kyrgyzstan =====
Regions of Kyrgyzstan

===== Districts of Kyrgyzstan =====
Districts of Kyrgyzstan

===== Municipalities of Kyrgyzstan =====
- Capital of Kyrgyzstan: Bishkek
- Cities of Kyrgyzstan

=== Demography of Kyrgyzstan ===
Demographics of Kyrgyzstan

== Government and politics of Kyrgyzstan ==
Politics of Kyrgyzstan

- Form of government:
- Capital of Kyrgyzstan: Bishkek
- Elections in Kyrgyzstan
- Political parties in Kyrgyzstan

=== Branches of the government of Kyrgyzstan ===
Government of Kyrgyzstan

==== Executive branch of the government of Kyrgyzstan ====
- Head of state: President of Kyrgyzstan,
- Head of government: Prime Minister of Kyrgyzstan,

==== Legislative branch of the government of Kyrgyzstan ====
- Parliament of Kyrgyzstan (unicameral): Supreme Council

==== Judicial branch of the government of Kyrgyzstan ====
Court system of Kyrgyzstan

- Supreme Court of Kyrgyzstan

=== Foreign relations of Kyrgyzstan ===
Foreign relations of Kyrgyzstan

- Diplomatic missions in Kyrgyzstan
- Diplomatic missions of Kyrgyzstan
- Kyrgyzstan–Russia relations
- Kyrgyzstan–Tajikistan relations
- Kyrgyzstan–Uzbekistan relations

==== International organization membership of Kyrgyzstan ====
The Kyrgyz Republic is a member of:

- Asian Development Bank (ADB)
- Collective Security Treaty Organization (CSTO)
- Commonwealth of Independent States (CIS)
- Economic Cooperation Organization (ECO)
- Eurasian Economic Community (EAEC)
- Euro-Atlantic Partnership Council (EAPC)
- European Bank for Reconstruction and Development (EBRD)
- Food and Agriculture Organization (FAO)
- General Confederation of Trade Unions (GCTU)
- International Atomic Energy Agency (IAEA)
- International Bank for Reconstruction and Development (IBRD)
- International Civil Aviation Organization (ICAO)
- International Criminal Court (ICCt) (signatory)
- International Criminal Police Organization (Interpol)
- International Development Association (IDA)
- International Federation of Red Cross and Red Crescent Societies (IFRCS)
- International Finance Corporation (IFC)
- International Fund for Agricultural Development (IFAD)
- International Labour Organization (ILO)
- International Monetary Fund (IMF)
- International Olympic Committee (IOC)
- International Organization for Migration (IOM)
- International Organization for Standardization (ISO) (correspondent)
- International Red Cross and Red Crescent Movement (ICRM)
- International Telecommunication Union (ITU)
- International Telecommunications Satellite Organization (ITSO)
- Inter-Parliamentary Union (IPU)
- Islamic Development Bank (IDB)
- Multilateral Investment Guarantee Agency (MIGA)
- Nonaligned Movement (NAM) (observer)
- Organisation of Islamic Cooperation (OIC)
- Organization for Security and Cooperation in Europe (OSCE)
- Organisation for the Prohibition of Chemical Weapons (OPCW)
- Partnership for Peace (PFP)
- Permanent Court of Arbitration (PCA)
- Shanghai Cooperation Organisation (SCO)
- United Nations (UN)
- United Nations Conference on Trade and Development (UNCTAD)
- United Nations Educational, Scientific, and Cultural Organization (UNESCO)
- United Nations Industrial Development Organization (UNIDO)
- United Nations Mission in Liberia (UNMIL)
- United Nations Mission in the Central African Republic and Chad (MINURCAT)
- United Nations Mission in the Sudan (UNMIS)
- Universal Postal Union (UPU)
- World Customs Organization (WCO)
- World Federation of Trade Unions (WFTU)
- World Health Organization (WHO)
- World Intellectual Property Organization (WIPO)
- World Meteorological Organization (WMO)
- World Tourism Organization (UNWTO)
- World Trade Organization (WTO)

=== Law and order in Kyrgyzstan ===
Law of Kyrgyzstan

- Law Enforcement in Kyrgyzstan
- Constitution of Kyrgyzstan
- Human rights in Kyrgyzstan
  - LGBT rights in Kyrgyzstan
  - Freedom of religion in Kyrgyzstan

=== Military of Kyrgyzstan ===
Military of Kyrgyzstan

- Command
  - Commander-in-chief: Sooronbay Jeenbekov
- Forces
  - Army of Kyrgyzstan
  - Air Force of Kyrgyzstan

== History of Kyrgyzstan ==
History of Kyrgyzstan

== Culture of Kyrgyzstan ==
Culture of Kyrgyzstan

- Cuisine of Kyrgyzstan
- Languages of Kyrgyzstan
- Media in Kyrgyzstan
- National symbols of Kyrgyzstan
  - Coat of arms of Kyrgyzstan
  - Flag of Kyrgyzstan
  - National anthem of Kyrgyzstan
- People of Kyrgyzstan
- Prostitution in Kyrgyzstan
- Public holidays in Kyrgyzstan
- Religion in Kyrgyzstan
  - Buddhism in Kyrgyzstan
  - Christianity in Kyrgyzstan
  - Hinduism in Kyrgyzstan
  - Islam in Kyrgyzstan
- World Heritage Sites in Kyrgyzstan: None

=== Art of Kyrgyzstan ===
- Cinema of Kyrgyzstan
- Music of Kyrgyzstan
- Television in Kyrgyzstan

=== Sports in Kyrgyzstan ===
Sports in Kyrgyzstan

- Football in Kyrgyzstan

== Economy and infrastructure of Kyrgyzstan ==
Economy of Kyrgyzstan

- Economic rank, by nominal GDP (2007): 143rd (one hundred and forty third)
- Agriculture in Kyrgyzstan
- Banking in Kyrgyzstan
  - National Bank of Kyrgyzstan
- Communications in Kyrgyzstan
  - Internet in Kyrgyzstan
- Companies of Kyrgyzstan
- Currency of Kyrgyzstan: Som
  - ISO 4217: KGS
- Energy in Kyrgyzstan
- Health care in Kyrgyzstan
- Tourism in Kyrgyzstan
- Transport in Kyrgyzstan
  - Airports in Kyrgyzstan
  - Rail transport in Kyrgyzstan

== Education in Kyrgyzstan ==
Education in Kyrgyzstan

== Health in Kyrgyzstan ==
- Health in Kyrgyzstan
- Abortion in Kyrgyzstan

== See also ==
Kyrgyzstan

- List of international rankings
- List of Kyrgyzstan-related topics
- List of villages in Kyrgyzstan
- Member state of the United Nations
- Outline of Asia
- Outline of geography
