= China–Kyrgyzstan relations =

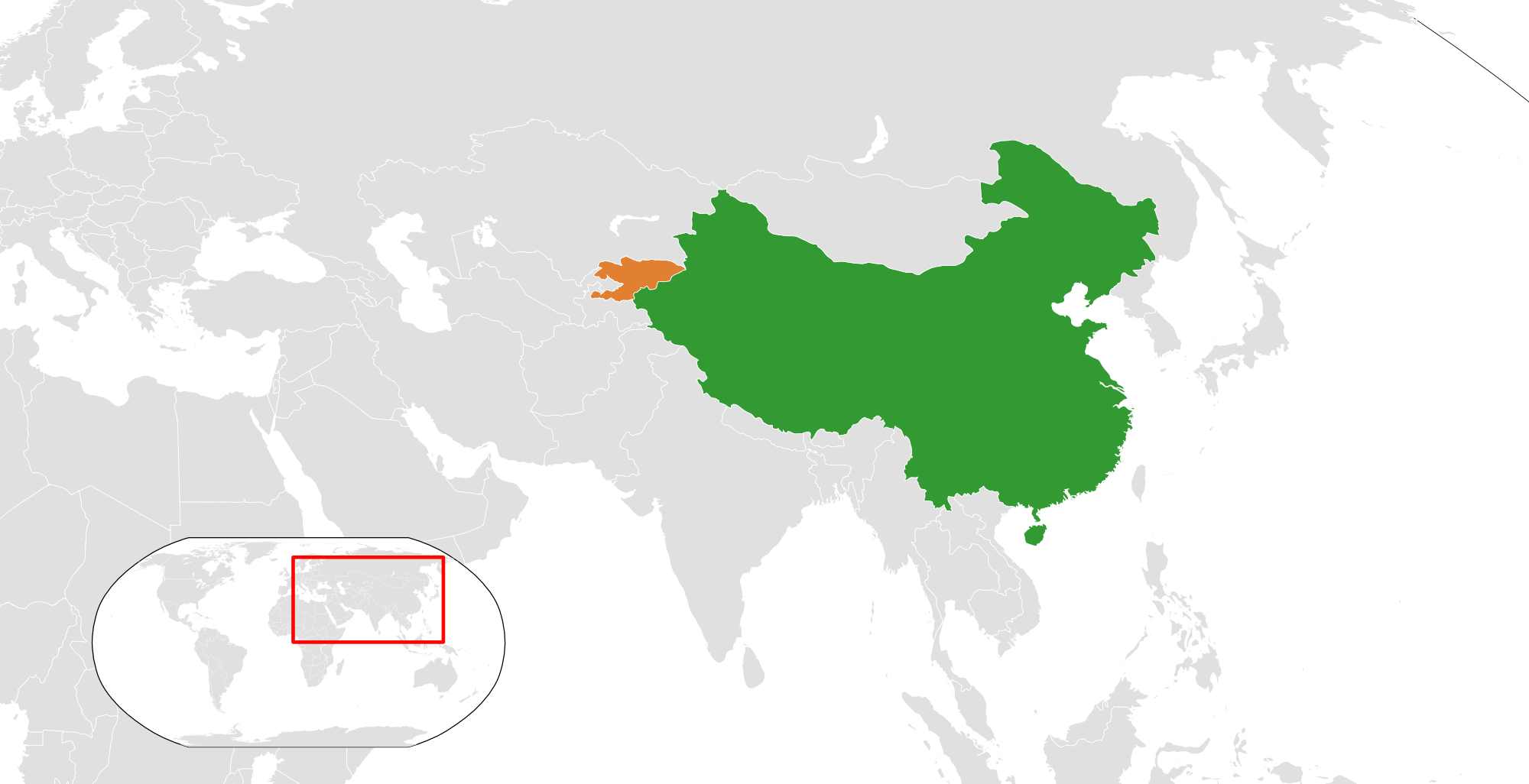

- China: Kyrgyzstan

China–Kyrgyzstan relations are the bilateral relationship between China and Kyrgyzstan.

== Historical relations ==
As of 1996, relations between Kyrgyzstan and China were an area of substantial uncertainty for the government in Bishkek. The free-trade zone in Naryn attracted large numbers of Chinese businesspeople, who came to dominate most of the republic's import and export of small goods. Most of this trade is in barter conducted by ethnic Kyrgyz or Kazakhs who are Chinese citizens. The Kyrgyz government had expressed alarm over the numbers of Chinese who were moving into Naryn and other parts of Kyrgyzstan, but no preventive measures had been taken as of 1996.

Kyrgyzstan President Sadyr Japarov has a favorable view of China. Japarov states that relations between the two countries are the strongest they have ever been.

== Cultural relations ==
=== Educational ===
Kyrgyzstan has four Confucius Institutes.

=== Migration ===
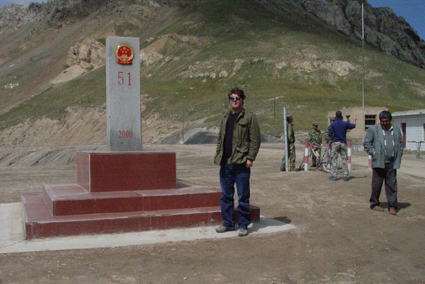
The Chinese border crossing at the Torugart Pass on the road between Bishkek (Kyrgyzstan) and Kashgar (Xinjiang)

There is some anti-Uyghur sentiment in Kyrgyzstan. Daniar Usenov, who became the Prime Minister of Kyrgyzstan in 2009, received accolades from multiple Kyrgyzstan newspapers by articulating the fear in 1999 that Kyrgyzstan would become "Uygurstan" through an alleged Chinese plot of miscegenation.

== Economic relations ==
=== Trade ===
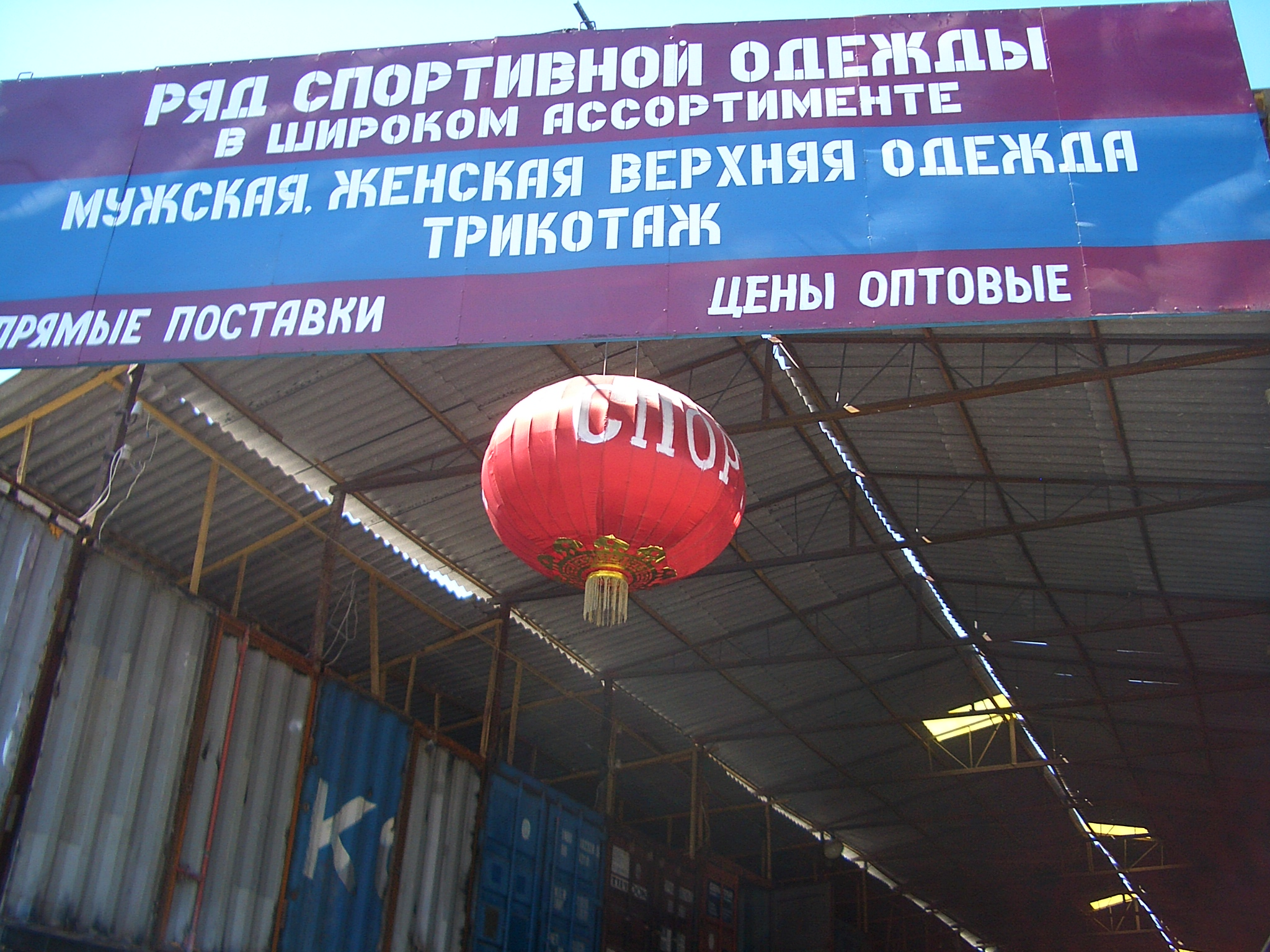
Inside Bishkek's gigantic Dordoy Bazaar, filled primarily with Chinese products

Since the 1990s, trade with China grew enormously. Particularly important is the re-export of Chinese consumer goods to the neighboring Uzbekistan (mostly via Karasuu Bazar at Kara-Suu, Osh Province) and to Kazakhstan and Russia (mostly via Dordoy Bazaar in Bishkek). Due to its linguistic and cultural affinity with the Chinese (particularly, Hui) people, Kyrgyzstan's small Dungan community plays a significant role in the trade. In some political quarters, the prospect of Chinese domination stimulated nostalgia for the days of Moscow's control.

As of 2019, China is one of the main trade and economic partners of Kyrgyzstan. In 2022, China accounted for 37% of Kyrgyzstan's total trade, far eclipsing other countries. China is also the main bilateral creditor of Kyrgyzstan. Their economic relationship is highly asymmetrical as "[w]hile for China the bilateral projects in Kyrgyzstan are small, they are significant for Kyrgyzstan".

Kyrgyzstan is active in China's Belt and Road Initiative (BRI), viewing the BRI as an opportunity to increase inbound foreign direct investment, modernize its transportation infrastructure, and build better connections with Europe and China. It is also involved in China's Digital Silk Road Initiative, through which carefully, but step by step strengthens its high-tech cooperation with China.

=== Environmental cooperation ===
In April 2025, a significant environmental initiative was launched between Kyrgyzstan and China with the establishment of a large-scale tree nursery in Bishkek, aimed at improving the ecological conditions of the city. Chinese partners from Qingdao are collaborating with the Bishkek municipality on this project, which is part of a broader effort to restore the city's greenery. The nursery, initially covering five hectares, has already seen the planting of over 12,300 tree saplings and 9,000 shrubs, with plans for it to eventually span 100 hectares. The cultivation focuses on deciduous tree species, including Norway maple, Chinese acacia, and linden, to improve urban air quality and restore the city's lost tree cover, particularly after decades of rapid urbanization. This initiative is in line with Kyrgyzstan's national “Jashyl Muras” (Green Heritage) campaign, launched in March 2022 by President Sadyr Japarov, which aims to plant 5-6 million saplings annually across the country. In 2024, over 8.1 million saplings were planted nationwide as part of this program. The tree nursery will play a critical role in reversing deforestation and promoting environmental restoration efforts in Bishkek.

== Taiwan ==
Kyrgyzstan follows the one China principle, and recognizes government of the People's Republic of China as the sole legal government representing the whole of China and Taiwan as "an inalienable part" of China. Kyrgyzstan also supports all efforts by the PRC to "achieve national reunification" and opposes Taiwan independence.

== Territorial disputes ==
China had historically claimed large tracts of Kyrgyzstan's territory, encompassing almost the whole of the country. According to Chinese historians, in the second half of the 19th century, China's Qing dynasty was forced to enter into a number of unequal treaties in which Kyrgyz lands, particularly the North Kyrgyz lands, were ceded to the Russian Empire in 1863.

After the dissolution of the Soviet Union, Kyrgyzstan and the two other Central Asian republics bordering the People's Republic of China (PRC) inherited the border disputes that the USSR and PRC had themselves inherited from the Russian and Qing Empires. In 1996, the two countries signed their first border treaty. It was ratified in 1998. That first treaty demarcated approximately 900 km of the countries' 1,011 km of shared border. A second border agreement was signed in 1999 by Chinese president, CCP general secretary Jiang Zemin and Kyrgyzstan's president Askar Akaev. In that agreement, China received 90,000 hectares in the Uzengi-Kuush region in exchange for Kyrgyzstan receiving two-thirds of Khan Tengri peak and Victory Peak.

== Military relations ==
=== Security and military cooperation ===
The security situation in Kyrgyzstan has been of great concern to China, not only because of the issue over the Uyghurs, but also due to problems with narcotic trafficking. During the 2005 Tulip Revolution China considered developments in Kyrgyzstan so important that they raised the possibility of deploying combat forces.

Kyrgyzstan and China have concluded joint military exercises several times. Kyrgyzstan has participated in the Shanghai Cooperation Organisation's series of joint military exercises (titled "Peace Mission") several times, alongside Russia, China, Kazakhstan, and Tajikistan. Kyrgyzstan participated in the 2010, 2012, and 2014 exercises. Kyrgyzstan has also participated in the SCO's "anti-terrorist exercises" with China and other SCO countries, doing so first in 2002 and subsequently in 2003, 2006, and 2010. Kyrgyz authorities have taken hard measures against alleged Uyghur separatists. Kyrgyzstan President Sadyr Japarov states that China and Kyrgyzstan will oppose East Turkestan terrorist forces including through repatriating suspects.

Kyrgyzstan adheres to the one China principle and supports China's claim of sovereignty over Taiwan.

== Humanitarian relations ==
In 2025, China intensified its humanitarian engagement with Kyrgyzstan through a shift in foreign aid strategy, marking a new phase of its Belt and Road Initiative (BRI). On 16 May, the China International Development Cooperation Agency (CIDCA), in collaboration with the UN World Food Programme, launched its first multilateral initiative in Central Asia; providing school meals to over 100,000 children in southern Kyrgyzstan. This project, supported by the Global Development and South-South Cooperation Fund, will distribute 1,700 metric tons of fortified food to 300 schools across Osh, Jalal-Abad, and Batken provinces by year's end. Dubbed “Small and Beautiful” (S&B), the initiative reflects a broader Chinese strategy to prioritize smaller, community-based development efforts over large-scale infrastructure, particularly in the wake of the United States’ withdrawal of USAID operations from the region. A CIDCA report identified these S&B efforts as a second phase of BRI, emphasizing China's intent to scale them up and integrate them with ongoing infrastructure projects to address livelihood challenges and strengthen development foundations in Central Asia.

== Public opinion ==
As of 2026, the trend in public opinion surveys in Kyrgyzstan is increasingly favorable views of China.

== See also ==
- China–Kyrgyzstan border
- Foreign relations of China
- Foreign relations of Kyrgyzstan
