= Promstroybank =

Promstroybank is a latinization of Russian Промстройбанк, shorthand for Промышленно-строительный банк, meaning Industrial and Construction Bank. It may refer to:

- Promstroybank (USSR), a Soviet bank created in 1988; or some of its successor entities after 1991:
- Promstroybank (Belarus), a bank in Belarus
- Promstroybank (Kyrgyzstan), a bank in Kyrgyzstan
- Promstroybank (Russia), absorbed by VTB Bank in 2005
