= Borkoldoy Too =

Mountain range in Kyrgyzstan

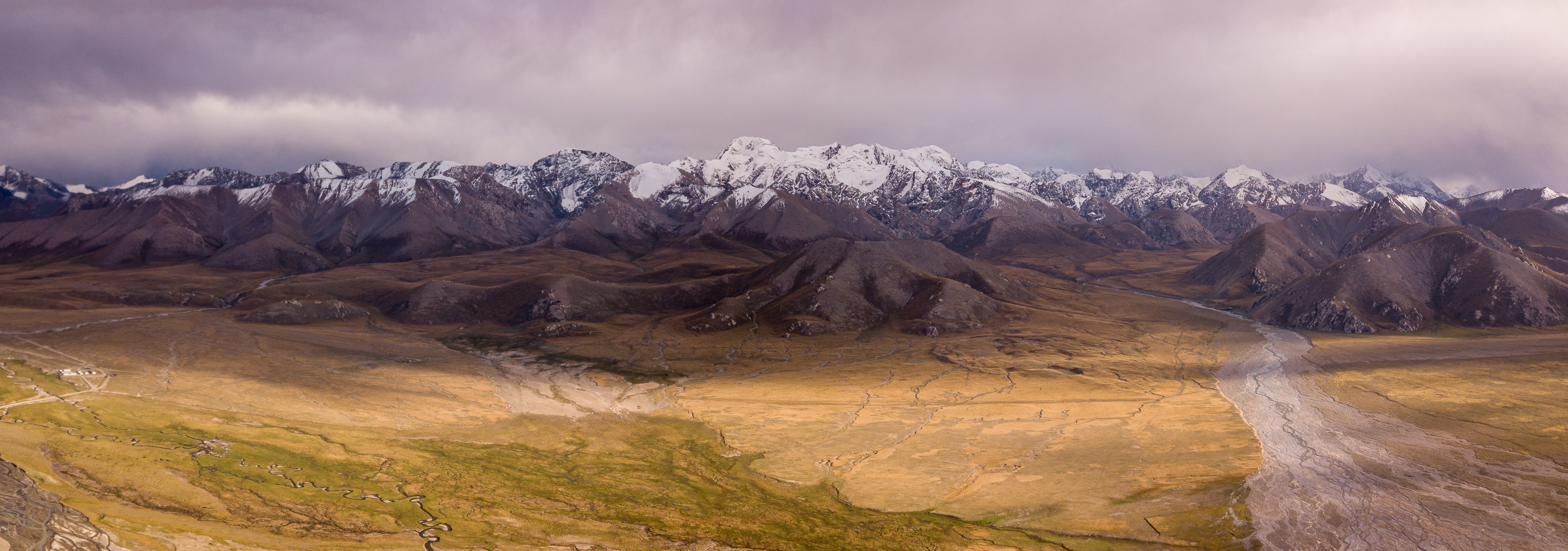

Highest point
- Elevation: 5,170 m (16,960 ft)
- Coordinates: 41°15′N 77°50′E

Dimensions
- Length: 90 km (56 mi) E-W
- Width: 34 km (21 mi) N-S

Naming
- Native name: Борколдой тоо (Kyrgyz)

Geography
- Location within Kyrgyzstan
- Country: Kyrgyzstan

Located in the central and inner Tien-Shan region, the Borkoldoy Too (Kyrgyz: Борколдой тоо) is bordered by the valleys of the Karakol, Chakyrykorum, Uzengy-Kuushtuyuk, and Borkoldoy rivers in the north, and the Chon Uzengy-Kuus, Kichi Uzengy-Kuus, and Bozjalpak rivers in the south. Stretching for 90 kilometers from the Köbürgentü Pass (elevation 3,907 m) to the source of the Bozjalpak River, it lies along an east-west axis.

The highest peak, located at the source of the Jagalmai Glacier, reaches 5,170 meters, with an average elevation of 4,500 meters and a width of 34 kilometers. Major passes include Borkoldoy (4,000 m), Ashuusuu (3,640 m), and Tepshi (4,121 m).

== Geology ==
The ridge consists of upper Silurian and lower Carboniferous limestone, marble, metamorphosed schists, basalt, porphyry, diabase, red Carboniferous rocks, sandstone, and other metamorphic formations. These rocks were uplifted along tectonic faults during the Neogene and Anthropogene periods, forming an anticline structure extending along an east-west direction. The structure is asymmetrical: the northern slope is shorter, while the southern slope is longer.

The terrain is characterized by distinct tiers:

1. Upper Tier: Remnants of an ancient plain (elevation 4,000–5,000 m), with closed basins formed by ancient and modern glacial activity, now occupied by glaciers.
2. Middle Tier: Developed during the Neogene and early Quaternary periods due to tectonic movements, consisting of three terraces separated by ridges.
3. Lower Tier: Formed in the mid-Quaternary, featuring terraces and deep, V-shaped gorges with steep walls. Glacial movement in the upper reaches of rivers has created basin-like valleys.

== Landscapes ==
The landscape changes according to elevation, following the principles of vertical zonation:

- Desert and Dry Steppe (2,600–2,800 m): Features plants like wormwood, saltwort, and spiny shrubs.
- Steppe (2,700–4,000 m): Dominated by feather grass, shrubs, and sedges.
- Subalpine Meadows (2,800–4,000 m): Home to various herbs and grasses, including sedge and feather grass.
- Alpine Meadows (2,900–4,200 m): Includes plants like gentian and saxifrage.
- Glacial-Nival Zone: Characterized by glacial and snow-covered landscapes.
