= Mass media in Kyrgyzstan =

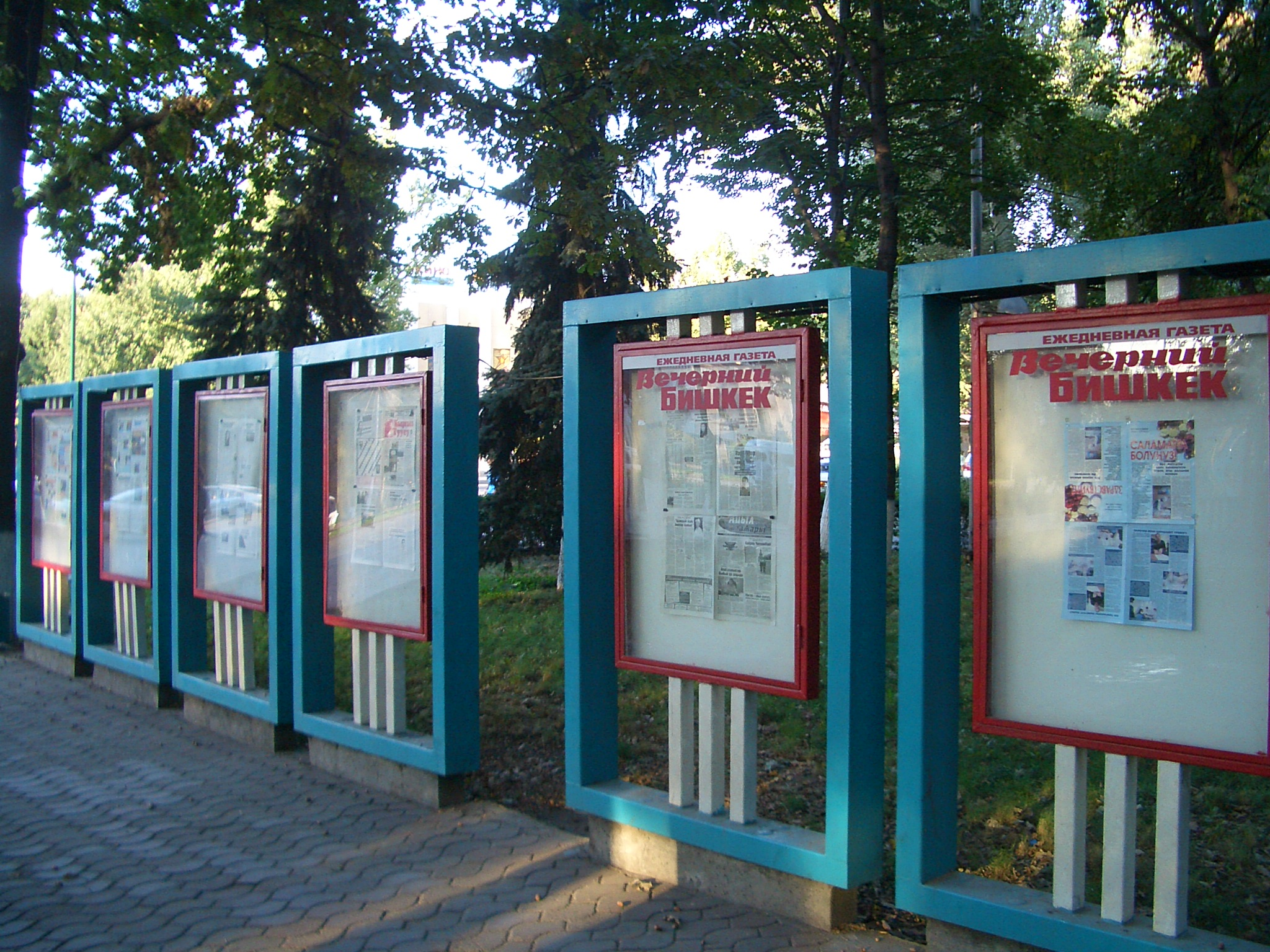
In a Soviet tradition, newspapers are posted for everyone to read for free on Bishkek's Erkindik Blvd.

The mass media in Kyrgyzstan is restricted and the media landscape is dominated by the government. However, there is greater freedom and pluralism in Kyrgyzstan than in other Central Asian countries.

In recent years, the Kyrgyzstan government has strengthened censorship and implemented laws that restrict media freedom. Independent media outlets face crackdowns and independent journalists have faced repression, including detention. Independent media have also been shut down by the government.

== Newspapers and magazines ==
In 2003, eight of Kyrgyzstan’s 25 to 30 newspapers and magazines were state-owned, and the state publishing house, Uchkun, was the major newspaper publisher in the country.

== Television and radio ==
Competition among media outlets is skewed by heavy government support of pro-government newspapers and broadcast outlets. In the early 2000s, an increasing number of such outlets were controlled by individuals with ties to the government. There is currently a mixture of 8 state owned and 20 private television networks in Kyrgyzstan, where the government restricts broadcasts and has in the past, intimidated or shut down private networks such as NTS which aired opposition protests. There are 23 FM radio stations and a total of 13 AM stations. The state-owned media is dominant, and moves to privatise it by the opposition were blocked by President Kurmanbek Bakiyev, given the political climate in the country. However coverage is limited, especially in the south of the country. Most private networks are based in the capital, Bishkek. There were 187.6 television sets per 1,000 population in 2004; no statistics were available on radio use.

Like television and radio, news media are restricted in what they can report and are rarely critical of the government. Journalists in the past have been harassed and intimidated who were both pro and anti-government, and protested when the President took the role of deputy director at the state run Public Broadcasting Corporation of the Kyrgyz Republic. There is a mixture of state owned and private agencies, in Kyrgyz, Russian and English languages. Libel is a punishable offence, though it is unevenly enforced.

After the change of government in 2005, opposition views generally received more exposure in the media than before. However, access to the mass media by opposition spokespersons remained limited. An opposition television station Sentyabr (September) was ordered to close by a Kyrgyz court.

== Internet ==
More than 34 percent of population in Kyrgyzstan were using Internet by 2016. The growth of the Internet usage led to online media being more significant, and playing a bigger role in the political processes in the country. The best example of that were anticorruption protests held in Bishkek in November and December 2019 after Kloop, a local media outlet, had published an investigation together with the Kyrgyz bureau of Radio Liberty and Organized Crime and Corruption Reporting Project about the massive corruption at the Kyrgyz customs service.

== See also ==
- Communications in Kyrgyzstan
- Freedom of the press in Kyrgyzstan
- Echo of Moscow
