= Kyrgyz Seismic Network =

The Kyrgyz Republic Seismic Network (KRNET) is a regional continuous telemetric network of very broadband seismic data in Kyrgyzstan. It was established in 2008 and replaced the Kyrgyz Seismic Network (KNET) from 1991.

== Background ==
The territory of Kyrgyzstan is characterized by high seismicity. About three thousand earthquakes occur on average each year with magnitude up to eight points. Therefore, seismic monitoring is of crucial importance to the country.

== History: KNET ==
The Kyrgyz Seismic Network (KNET) was jointly developed under the Joint Seismic Program by the Incorporated Research Institutions for Seismology (IRIS), including the University of California, San Diego, the Kyrgyz Institute of Seismology, and the Russian Institute of High Temperature Physics. As a part of the US-USSR Joint Seismic Program, KNET was installed in 1991 by a team of American, Russian, and Kyrgyz seismologists. The network carried on its operation under an agreement between IRIS Consortium and the Academy of Sciences of the Kyrgyz Republic after the dissolution of the Soviet Union.

It is located along the boundary between northern Tian Shan mountains and the Kazakh platform. Several major tectonic features are spanned by the network including a series of thrust faults in the Tien Shan, the Chu Valley, and the NW- SE trending ridges north of Bishkek. The network consists of Streckeisen STS-2 sensors with 24-bit PASSCAL data loggers. All continuous real-time data are accessible through the IRIS DMC in Seattle with over 95% data availability.

The KNET system is designed to monitor regional seismic activity for events of magnitudes higher than 3.5. It also provides high quality data for research projects in regional and global broadband seismology. Through its operations, KNET ensures delivery of high-performance seismic data. This data is used in research, such as monitoring domestic seismic activities, estimation of seismic hazards, or detailed analyses of the structures of Earth's crust and mantle.

Several institutions, such as the national institutes of seismology in Kyrgyzstan and Kazakhstan, the National Nuclear Centre of Kazakhstan (NNCK), and the Russian Academy of Sciences, use KNET data for estimating seismic hazards. In addition, NNCK in conjunction with LAMONT laboratory (USA) carried out verification research and monitoring of nuclear detonations in China, India and Pakistan using KNET data.

=== List of KNET stations ===
KNET consists of ten stations:

1. Ala-Archa(AAK)

2. AML Almayashu(AML)

3. Chumysh (CHM)

4. Erkin-Sai(EKS2)

5. Karagaibulak (KBK)

6. Kuzart(KZA)

7. Tokmak(TKM2)

8. Uchtor(UCH)

9. Ulahole(ULHL)

10. Uspenovka (USP)

The stations are located near the capital of the country, Bishkek. The telemetry system was upgraded in 1998.

== KRNET ==
KRNET is a network of fifteen digital broad-band stations located mostly in the seismically high active southern parts of Kyrgyzstan. The network was introduced in 2008 within the frame of NORSAR, assisted by the Ministry of Foreign affairs of Norway. Along with its predecessor, KNET, the new network provides a good coverage of the country's territory, allowing major improvements in the accuracy of seismic event locations.

The real time data transmission from the stations is available online through the GPRS Internet to the Kyrgyz National Data Center, and further to FDSN though high-speed internet. This data is openly available on the website of IRIS.

=== List of KRNET stations ===
KRNET consists of fifteen stations:

1. Ananevo (ANVS)

2. Aral (ARLS)

3. Arkit (ARK)

4. Arslanbob(ARSB)

5. Batken (BTK)

6. Boom (BOOM)

7. Karakol (PRZ)

8. Naryn (NRN)

9. Toktogul (TOKL)

10. Osh (OHH)

11. SSD (FRU1)

12. Kaji-Sai (KDJ)

13. Karamyk (DRK)

14. Manas (MNAS)

15. Sufi-Kurgan (SFK)
