= National symbols of Kyrgyzstan =

The flag of Kyrgyzstan

The emblem of Kyrgyzstan

The national symbols of Kyrgyzstan are defined by Article 6 of the Constitution of Kyrgyzstan. They consist of the National Flag, the National Emblem, and the National Anthem.

== Symbols ==
	Symbol	Image
Coat of arms	Coat of arms of Kyrgyzstan	Coat of Arms of Kyrgyzstan
Flag	National flag of Kyrgyzstan	State Flag of Kyrgyzstan
Flower	National flower of Kyrgyzstan; Fritillaria eduardii	State Flower of Kyrgyzstan
Tree	National tree of Kyrgyzstan; Juniperus pseudosabina	State Tree of Kyrgyzstan
Bird	National bird of Kyrgyzstan; Falco rusticolus	State Bird of Kyrgyzstan
Animal	National animal of Kyrgyzstan; Panthera uncia	State Animal of Kyrgyzstan
Fruit	National fruit of Kyrgyzstan; Morus nigra	State Fruit of Kyrgyzstan

=== National anthem ===
Kyrgyz original (Cyrillic script)

I
Ак мөңгүлүү аска, зоолор, талаалар,
Элибиздин жаны менен барабар.
Сансыз кылым Ала-Тоосун мекендеп,
Сактап келди биздин ата-бабалар.

Кайырма:
Алгалай бер, кыргыз эл,
Азаттыктын жолунда.
Өркүндөй бер, өсө бер,
Өз тагдырың колуңда.

II
Аткарылып элдин үмүт тилеги,
Желбиреди эркиндиктин желеги.
Бизге жеткен ата салтын, мурасын,
Ыйык сактап урпактарга берели.

Кайырма

Singable English translation

I
Land of snowy mountains, steppes and valleys,
Which are equal to the souls of our folks.
Within your Ala-Too for aeons countless,
Where our fathers dwelled and protected them.

Chorus:
March on, oh Kyrgyz folk,
March towards democracy!
Keep prospering, off we go,
In your hands lies your destiny!

II
Our hopes, aspirations accomplished,
Your banner of freedom is soaring over us,
With our forebears' traditions we are endowed,
For aeons shall our culture stay holy to us.

Chorus

=== See also ===
- National symbols of Afghanistan
