= Environmental issues in Kyrgyzstan =

The major environmental issues in Kyrgyzstan, are summarized in the 2007 Concept of Ecological Security of Kyrgyz Republic and discussed in other environmental and environmental policy documents such as National Environmental Action Plan (1995), Country Development Strategy for 2009–2011, Strategy on Biological Diversity (2002), 2nd Environmental Performance Review of Kyrgyzstan (2008), etc.

The Concept of Ecological Security considers environmental issues in Kyrgyzstan within the global, regional and national spheres of influence.

== Global environmental issues in Kyrgyzstan ==
Kyrgyzstan has a lot of problems including:

Global climate change, ozone layer depletion, desertification, and biodiversity loss are among global environmental issues presently on the agenda in Kyrgyzstan.

- Global climate change. Kyrgyzstan acknowledged the problem of global climate change and in 2003 ratified the Kyoto Protocol to the United Nations Framework Convention on Climate Change. It is estimated that the energy sector of the country is responsible for emissions of approximately two-thirds of its total carbon dioxide, and in absolute terms this amount will likely grow, even though with the increase in share of produced hydropower. Related to global climate change in Kyrgyzstan is a problem of deglaciation. The area occupied by glaciers has decreased by 20% lately and there are concerns that glaciers in the country can disappear by 2100.
- Ozone layer depletion. Kyrgyzstan acknowledged the global problem of ozone layer depletion and in 2000 it ratified the Montreal Protocol on Substances that Deplete the Ozone Layer to the Vienna Convention for the Protection of the Ozone Layer.
- Desertification. The country acknowledged the problem of desertification and in 1999 it acceded to the United Nations Convention to Combat Desertification. Desertification poses a real threat for Kyrgyzstan. According to the Country Development Strategy for 2009–2011, of 10.6 million hectares of total agricultural land more than 88% were found to be degraded and subject to desertification, areas of soil desalinization have increased and amounts to 75% of all arable land, and approximately half of all pasture lands are classified as degraded for both vegetation and soils.
- Biodiversity loss. In terms of biological diversity Kyrgyzstan holds a prominent place worldwide: it possess around 1% of all known species while its area makes up only 0.13% of world land. According to Biodiversity Strategy and Action Plan, the threats to biodiversity are related to anthropogenic activity and include habitat loss and alteration, fragmentation of natural communities due to overuse, over harvesting, direct mortality, introduction of non-native species, environmental pollution, and climate change. The Concept of Ecological Security states that among natural factors that affect biodiversity in Kyrgyzstan are desertification and climate change. Kyrgyzstan acknowledged the problem of biodiversity and in 1996 acceded to Convention on Biological Diversity.

== Regional environmental issues in Kyrgyzstan ==
- Wastes of the mining industry. Waste of the mining industry poses a direct threat to the environment of both Kyrgyzstan and neighboring countries. Located at high elevations in a fragile mountain environment the mining industry has generated hundreds of millions of tons of waste rock and tailing in dumps and tailing ponds which serve as a source of permanent pollution of the environment by heavy metals, radioactive materials and cyanide. The bulk of the mining waste is located in river basins and since Kyrgyzstan belongs to those areas subjected to a great extent to natural disasters such as earthquakes and landslides, presents high risk of trans-boundary pollution. The potentially affected population in Kyrgyzstan, and near border areas of Kazakhstan, Uzbekistan, and Tajikistan is estimated as of 5 million.
- Water pressures. Sharing of natural resources is a significant issue among the countries of Central Asia. Kyrgyzstan and Tajikistan have significant water resources originating from the Amu Darya and Syr Darya rivers, which in the Soviet Era was shared with Uzbekistan, Kazakhstan, and Turkmenistan in return for gas, oil, and electricity. However, modern damming projects, such as the Kambarata-1 Dam on the Naryn river and Toktogul Dam on the Syr Darya (both examples of Kyrgyz dams affecting regional water pressures), have caused Uzbekistan and Kazakhstan to lose their surplus of electricity and thus their ability to barter for water with Kyrgyzstan and Tajikistan. By the late 1990s the Soviet resource-sharing system had completely broken down, and a new system has yet to be put in place due to lack of political will and distrust between the Central Asian republics.

== National environmental issues ==
- Air pollution. The air pollution has increased as a serious problem in urban centers during the last years. The major sources of air pollution are energy and construction materials sectors, mining and processing industries, households using coal, and transport. Air quality deterioration is related to more extensive use of coal in combined heat power plants instead of natural gas, using low-grade fuels in households, and growing vehicle fleet that involves many old, poorly maintained vehicles.
- Water pollution. The major sources of water pollution are industrial wastewater, wastewater from agriculture, household wastewater, landfill leachate, and mine drainage. Municipal wastewater collection systems collect only about 70% of all municipal wastewater. Only 20% of the total volume of wastewater are discharged into wastewater treatment plants. Another problem is low capacity of surface water monitoring network that substantially degraded during the last 20–25 years.
- Degradation of mountain ecosystems. Kyrgyzstan is a mountainous country with 90% of its area located at altitudes of above 1,500 meters. Large-scale technological pressure on fragile mountain ecosystems by mining and infrastructure projects, and the agricultural sector served to disturb the balance and to accelerate of a number of natural hazards.
- Solid waste management

Industrial waste. Management of industrial waste is an issue in Kyrgyzstan. Some 92 mining sites that contain 250 million cubic meters of toxic and radioactive waste are located in Kyrgyzstan. From 1999 to 2007, the area occupied by these sites has increased from 189.3 hectares to 381 hectares.
Municipal solid waste. Management of household waste does not comply with sanitary and environmental requirements, there is no adequate waste utilization. For example, Bishkek municipal landfill designed for 3.3 million cubic meters presently contains 24 million cubic meters of household waste.
Agricultural waste. Agricultural waste is not managed in a proper way. Specifically, it relates to waste of large-scale farms.

- Natural and man-made hazards. The area of Kyrgyzstan is a subject of more than 20 natural hazards including earthquakes, landslides, avalanches, GLOFs, flooding, mudflows, rock slides, etc. that pose a threat to people's health, and cause damage to property.
- Forest integrity. Kyrgyzstan had a 2018 Forest Landscape Integrity Index mean score of 8.86/10, ranking it 13th globally out of 172 countries.

== The role of non-profit organizations ==
Environmental NGOs in Kyrgyzstan constantly assess the environmental problems, and keep track of it on EKOIS , a Kyrgyz Environmental News Service. The news is mainly in Russian, but English information is available as well.
