= Telecommunications in Kyrgyzstan =

Telecommunications in Kyrgyzstan include fixed and mobile telephones and the Internet.

== Communications policy ==
The long-term goal of the government's information and communications technology strategy is for the telecommunications sector to contribute 5 percent to gross domestic product by 2010. The June 2006 launch of the KazSat communications satellite from Kazakhstan was expected to reduce the dependence of all the Central Asian countries on European and U.S. telecommunications satellites. KazSat-2 was successfully launched in July 2011.

== Telephones ==
In the early 2000s, Kyrgyzstan used international investment support to restructure its telecommunications system, which had 7.7 telephone lines per 100 inhabitants in 2002 and 1,100,000 cellular phones in use in 2007. As part of the upgrading process, the government has attempted to sell a majority interest in the state-owned telecommunications company, Kyrgyztelecom, to foreign bidders. Companies from Russia, Sweden, and Turkey have been possible buyers. However, in 2005 an estimated 100,000 applicants were waiting for telephone line installation.

- Telephone system:
  - domestic: principally microwave radio relay; one cellular provider, probably limited to Bishkek region;
  - international: connections with other CIS countries by landline or microwave radio relay and with other countries by leased connections with Moscow international gateway switch and by satellite; satellite earth stations - 1 Intersputnik and 1 Intelsat; connected internationally by the Trans-Asia-Europe (TAE) fiber-optic line.

Since the mid-2010s, mobile communication in Kyrgyzstan has experienced accelerated growth, driven by the introduction of the 4G LTE standard. Mobile network operators have actively expanded coverage, including in remote and hard-to-reach areas, despite the country's mountainous terrain. As of the mid-2020s, mobile networks cover more than 99% of the populated territory of Kyrgyzstan.

== Internet ==
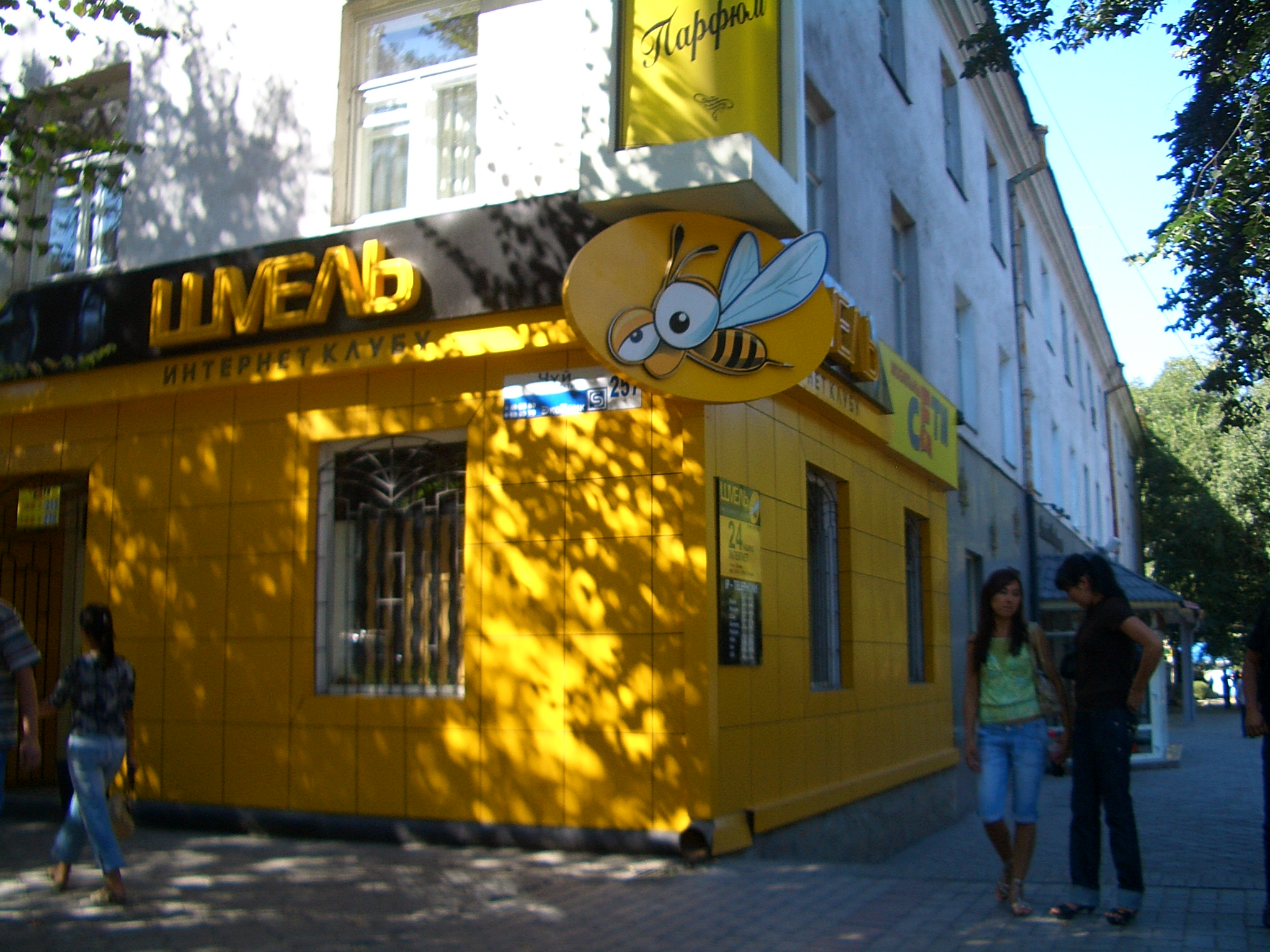
One of many internet cafes in Bishkek

In the early 2000s, Internet use has expanded rapidly. Between 1999 and 2005, the number of Internet subscribers increased from 3,000 to 263,000. In 2004 some 12,300 Internet hosts were in operation. The country code top level domain is .kg.

Variable upload/download speeds through xDSL are available through state telephone company Kyrgyz Telecom (up to 8 Mbit/s downlink) and private Internet service providers (ISPs) (up to 10 Mbit/s downlink). There is typically a monthly cap on the amount of data transferred, with separate caps depending on whether the data stays within Kyrgyzstan or travels beyond the border. Broadband internet access with unlimited international traffic is rarely offered by ISPs to the market at significantly higher price. This is probably due to the lack of country's telecommunications bandwidth capacity.

ISPs provide internet access through satellite backbone communication lines linked to Russia, Germany, Ukraine, and Kazakhstan. There is a major telecommunications project under construction - The Trans-Asia-Europe Fiber Optic Line, connecting Shanghai, China and Frankfurt, Germany, with the capacity of 622 Mbit/s, where Kyrgyzstan has completed its part. Completion of this project might affect broadband internet prices in Kyrgyzstan.

There are several ISPs that provide broadband internet access using different technologies such as xDSL, ISDN, Leased Line, and Ethernet. ISPs in Kyrgyzstan include Kyrgyz Telecom, Elcat, Asiainfo, Transfer Ltd, Totel, Megaline, Aknet, Intranet, Saima Telecom, My4G, Rikonet, AlaTV, ExNET, and IPSWICH.

Since the early 2020s, Kyrgyzstan has seen rapid development in the internet sector, accompanied by the expansion of communication channels and modernization of infrastructure. Most internet providers have moved away from data-capped plans, offering users unlimited internet access. In some cases, connection speeds reach up to 1 Gbps. Since 2020, large-scale deployment of fiber-optic lines has been underway across the country, covering both urban areas and remote settlements, contributing to the expansion of high-speed internet coverage nationwide.

=== Internet censorship and surveillance ===
Listed as engaged in selective Internet filtering in the political and social areas and as little or no evidence of filtering in the conflict/security and Internet tools areas by the OpenNet Initiative (ONI) in December 2010.

Access to the Internet in Kyrgyzstan has deteriorated as heightened political tensions have led to more frequent instances of second- and third-generation controls. The government has become more sensitive to the Internet's influence on domestic politics and enacted laws that increase its authority to regulate the sector.

Liberalisation of the telecommunications market in Kyrgyzstan has made the Internet affordable for the majority of the population. However, Kyrgyzstan is an effectively cyberlocked country dependent on purchasing bandwidth from Kazakhstan and Russia. The increasingly authoritarian regime in Kazakhstan is shifting toward more restrictive Internet controls, which is leading to instances of "upstream filtering" affecting ISPs in Kyrgyzstan.

== See also ==
- Media of Kyrgyzstan
