= List of valleys of Kyrgyzstan =

Valleys in Kyrgyzstan include:

A

- Alay Valley
- Arpa Valley

C

- Chüy Valley

F

- Fergana Valley

K

- Kichi-Kemin Valley
- Kyzyl-Üngkür Valley

M

- Ming-Kush Valley

S

- Suusamyr Valley
