= Banking in Kyrgyzstan =

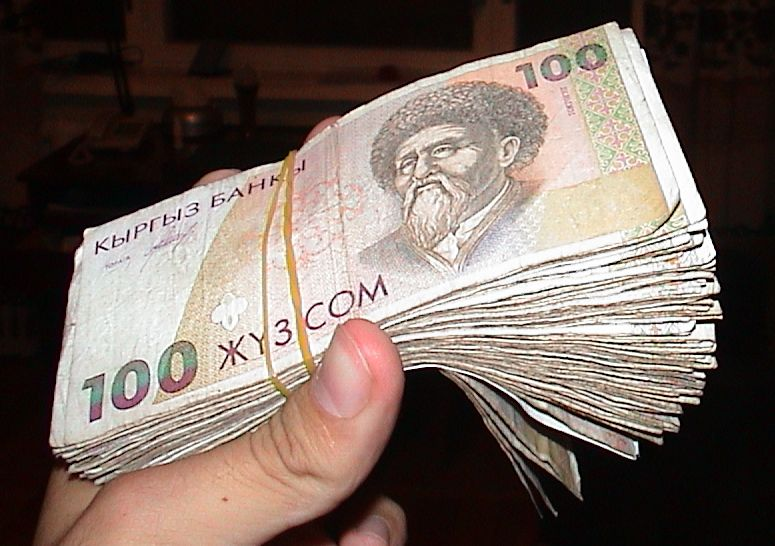
100 som notes

In mid-1995, the banking system in Kyrgyzstan continued to be dominated by the central savings bank (the National Bank of Kyrgyzstan, created in 1991) and by the three major commercial banks that succeeded the sectoral banks of the Soviet era and remained under state control. Those banks, the Agricultural and Industrial Bank (Agroprombank), the Industrial and Construction Bank (Promstroybank), and the Commercial Bank of Kyrgyzstan, owned 85 percent of banking assets in 1994.

New commercial banks, of which fifteen were established in 1993 and 1994, were owned by individuals or enterprises and had much less financial power than the state-owned banks. The new commercial banks have the right to buy and sell foreign currency and open deposit accounts. The National Bank is the official center of currency exchange, but in the mid-1990s it did not adhere to official exchange rates. In mid-1994, the government established the Bank for Reconstruction and Development, which uses state funds, foreign currency assets, and loans from abroad to aid small and medium-sized enterprises and to invest in targeted spheres of the economy, especially housing, construction, power generation, and agriculture.

As of 1994, the banking system had remained concentrated in the same areas as in the Soviet period. Although some diversification had occurred, loans tended to go to traditional clients. Because new commercial banks were small and initially were owned by state ministries and state-owned enterprises, competition developed slowly. Through 1994 Soviet-style accounting and reporting systems remained in use, and banking services such as domestic and international payments have remained at the same noncompetitive level as they were prior to 1991.

As of 1994, capabilities vital to a market-type economy, such as credit risk assessment and project appraisal, were lacking. Post-Soviet regulations on capital funds, exposure limits, and lending practices had not been enforced. The technical infrastructure of the banks also required substantial overhaul. In addition, the National Bank had been plagued by scandal; the first director, an Akayev protégé, was linked to several illegal financial operations in 1993 and 1994.

As of 1994, the limitations of the banking system had made it unable to efficiently mobilize and allocate financial resources into the national economy. This failure hindered privatization and other types of economic reform that require substantial amounts of risk capital upon which borrowers can rely. Especially critical were the bad loans held by the three state-owned banks (influenced by government interference in loan decisions, together with poor financial discipline on the part of major enterprises) and eroded capital base. In 1995 the National Bank's outstanding loans to agricultural and industrial enterprises totaled 1 billion som each.

== See also ==
- Optima Bank (Kyrgyzstan)
