= Demographics of Kyrgyzstan =

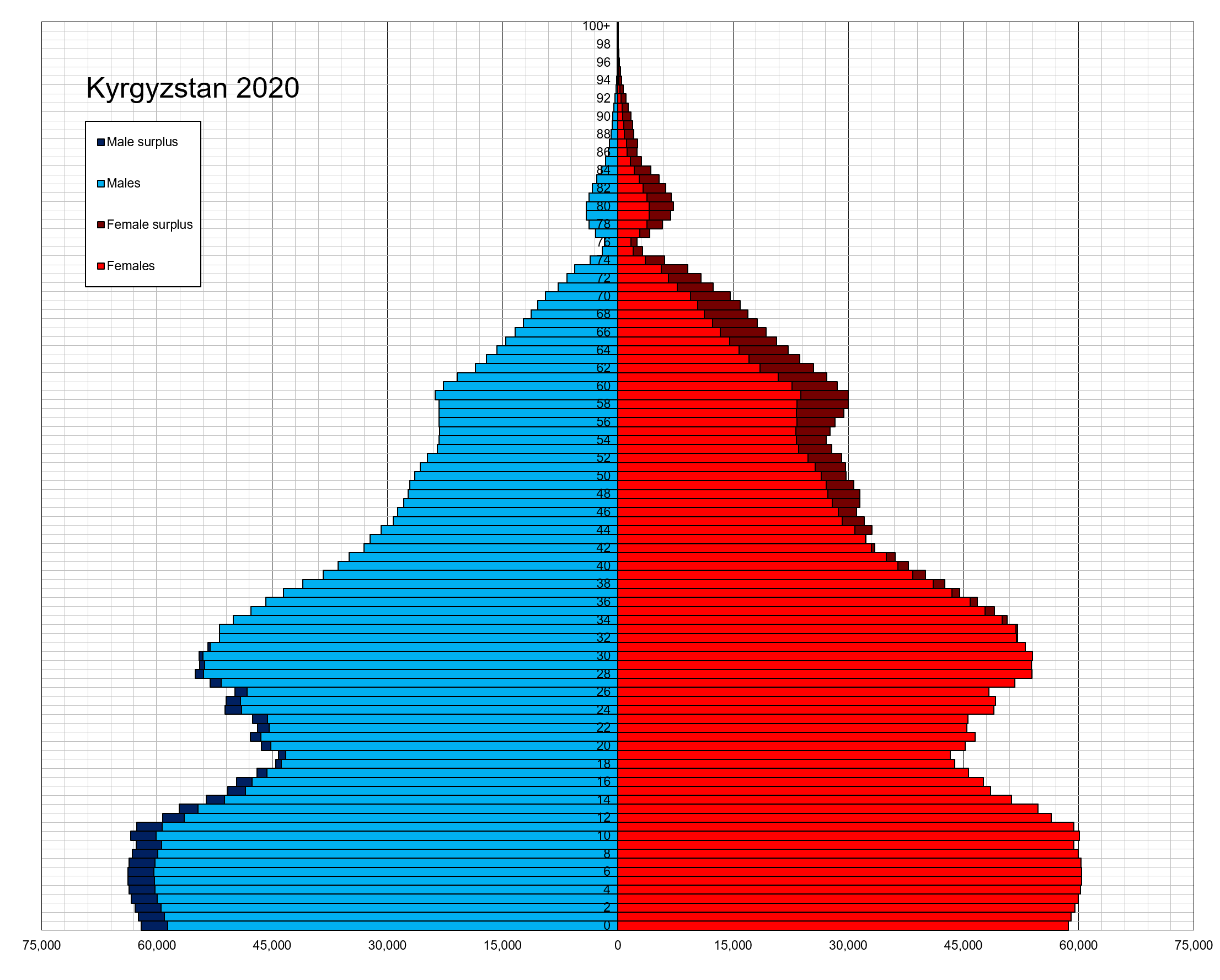
- Kyrgyzstan population pyramid in 2020
- Population: 6,636,800 (2021)
- Density: 27.4/km^{2} (71/sq mi)
- Growth rate: 1.32/1,000 population (2010)
- Birth rate: 24.0 births/1,000 population (2020)
- Death rate: 6.0 deaths/1,000 population (2020)
- Life expectancy: 71.9 years (2020)
  - male: 67.8 years (2020)
  - female: 76.0 years (2020)
- Fertility rate: 2.60 children born/woman (2024)
- Infant mortality: 14.4 deaths/1,000 live births (2020)

Age structure
- 0–14 years: 23.6%
- 15–64 years: 62.9%
- 65 and over: 6.2%

Sex ratio
- At birth: 1.05 male(s)/female
- Under 15: 1.04 male(s)/female
- 15–64 years: 0.96 male(s)/female
- 65 and over: 0.64 male(s)/female

Nationality
- Nationality: Kyrgyzstani
- Major ethnic: Kyrgyz
- Minor ethnic: Uzbek, Kazakh, Russian, Uyghur, Dungan, Tajik

Language
- Official: Kyrgyz, Russian
- Spoken: Kyrgyz, Russian

The demographics of Kyrgyzstan is about the demographic features of the population of Kyrgyzstan, including population growth, population density, ethnicity, education level, health, economic status, religious affiliations, and other aspects of the population. The name Kyrgyzstani, both for the people and the country, means "forty tribes", a reference to the epic hero Manas who unified forty tribes against the Oirats, as symbolized by the 40-ray sun on the flag of Kyrgyzstan.

Kyrgyzstan is one of the few post-Soviet countries in which the rural population's share of 58.29% exceeds the urban population's share of 41.71% as of 2024.

== Overview ==
Kyrgyzstan's population increased from 2.1 million to 4.8 million between the censuses of 1959 and 1999. Official estimates set the population at 6,389,500 in 2019. Of those, 34.4% are under the age of 15 and 6.2% are over the age of 65. The country is rural: only about one-third of Kyrgyzstan's population live in urban areas. The average population density is 27.4 inhabitants per square kilometre (71/sq mi).

The nation's largest ethnic group are the Kyrgyz, a Turkic people, which comprise 73.2% of the population (2018 census). Other ethnic groups include Russians (5.8%) concentrated in the north and Uzbeks (14.5%) living in the south. Small but noticeable minorities include Dungans (1.1%), Uyghurs (1.1%), Tajiks (0.9%), Kazakhs (0.7%) and Ukrainians (0.5%), and other smaller ethnic minorities (1.7%). Of the formerly sizable Volga German community, exiled here by Joseph Stalin from their earlier homes in the Volga German Republic, most have returned to Germany, and only a few small groups remain. A small percentage of the population are also Koreans, who are the descendants of the Koreans deported in 1937 from the Soviet Far East to Central Asia.

Kyrgyzstan has undergone a pronounced change in its ethnic composition since independence. The percentage of ethnic Kyrgyz increased from around 50% in 1979 to nearly 73% in 2018, while the percentage of Slavic ethnic groups (Russians, Ukrainians) dropped from 35% to about 6%.

The Kyrgyz have historically been semi-nomadic herders, living in round tents called yurts and tending sheep, horses and yaks. This nomadic tradition continues to function seasonally (see transhumance) as herding families return to the high mountain pasture (or jailoo) in the summer. The retention of this nomadic heritage and the freedoms that it implies continue to affect the political atmosphere in the country.

== Population size and structure ==
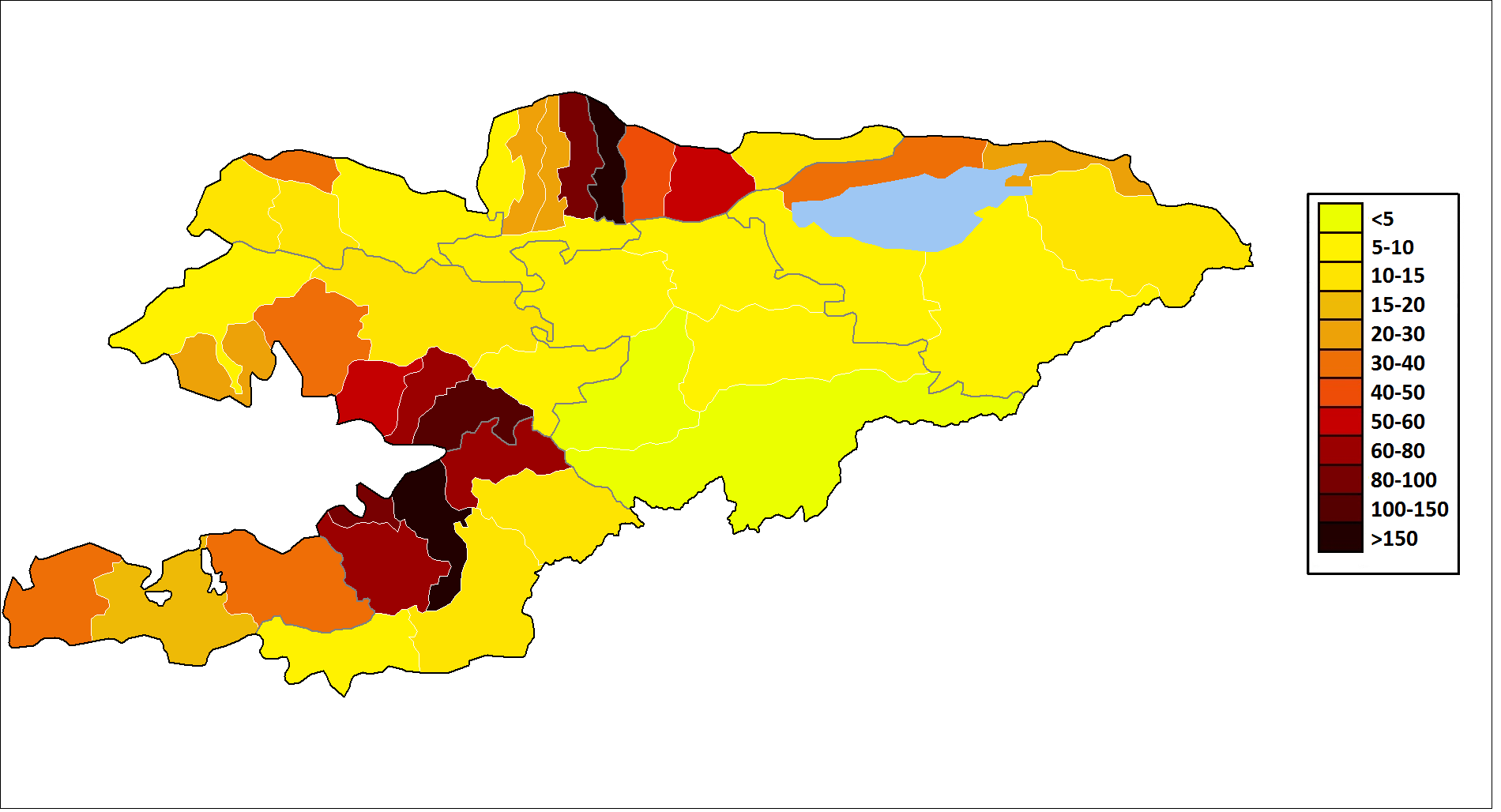
Population density of Kyrgyzstan, 2015

Population Estimates by Sex and Age Group (01.VII.2020) (Data refer to annual average population.):

Age group	Male	Female	Total	%
Total	3 265 870	3 314 296	6 580 166	100
0–4	413 265	392 172	805 437	12.24
5–9	388 796	369 309	758 105	11.52
10–14	309 396	297 034	606 430	9.22
15–19	258 649	249 178	507 827	7.72
20–24	263 240	252 719	515 959	7.84
25–29	289 819	279 117	568 936	8.65
30–34	282 674	281 432	564 106	8.57
35–39	222 715	220 855	443 570	6.74
40–44	180 015	182 328	362 343	5.51
45–49	157 253	167 537	324 790	4.94
50–54	142 981	156 499	299 480	4.55
55–59	129 553	149 093	278 646	4.23
60–64	99 239	121 193	220 432	3.35
65–69	59 174	80 206	139 380	2.12
70–74	33 247	50 398	83 645	1.27
75–79	13 209	21 957	35 166	0.53
80–84	13 189	25 642	38 831	0.59
85–89	4 822	10 280	15 102	0.23
90–94	3 131	5 305	8 436	0.13
95–99	1 127	1 459	2 586	0.04
100+	376	583	959	0.01
Age group	Male	Female	Total	Percent
0–14	1 111 457	1 058 515	2 169 972	32.98
15–64	2 026 138	2 059 951	4 086 089	62.10
65+	128 275	195 830	324 105	4.93

View source data.
View source data.
View source data.
View source data.

== Vital statistics ==
=== Registered births and deaths ===
Statistics are taken from the United Nations Demographic Yearbook, the National Statistical Committee of the Republic of Kyrgyzstan, the Demographic Annual of the Kyrgyz Republic, and Demoskop Weekly.

	Average population	Live births	Deaths	Natural change	Rates per 1000				Total fertility rate	Life expectancy		
	Average population	Live births	Deaths	Natural change	Crude birth rate	Crude death rate	Natural change	Crude migration rate	Total fertility rate	(male)	(female)	(total)
1950	1,740,000	56,471	14,845	41,626	32.5	8.5	24.0					
1951	1,768,000	58,828	13,927	44,901	33.3	7.9	25.4	−9.3				
1952	1,788,000	57,632	13,868	43,764	32.2	7.8	24.4	−13.1				
1953	1,818,000	60,755	14,288	46,467	33.4	7.9	25.5	−8.7				
1954	1,859,000	63,803	13,684	50,119	34.3	7.4	26.9	−4.3				
1955	1,903,000	63,883	14,923	48,960	33.6	7.8	25.8	−2.1				
1956	1,941,000	65,667	11,918	53,749	33.8	6.1	27.7	−7.7				
1957	1,978,000	68,644	12,275	56,369	34.7	6.2	28.5	−9.4				
1958	2,030,000	70,521	12,324	58,197	34.7	6.1	28.6	−2.3				
1959	2,099,000	70,501	12,930	57,571	33.6	6.2	27.4	6.6				
1960	2,172,000	80,209	13,259	66,950	36.9	6.1	30.8	4.0				
1961	2,256,000	80,671	15,175	65,496	35.8	6.7	29.1	9.6				
1962	2,333,000	79,010	15,141	63,869	33.9	6.5	27.4	6.7				
1963	2,413,000	80,279	14,986	65,293	33.3	6.2	27.1	7.2				
1964	2,495,000	79,342	15,834	63,508	31.8	6.3	25.5	8.5				
1965	2,573,000	80,812	16,693	64,119	31.4	6.5	24.9	6.4				
1966	2,655,000	81,771	17,888	63,883	30.8	6.7	24.1	7.8				
1967	2,737,000	83,609	19,550	64,059	30.5	7.1	23.4	7.5				
1968	2,818,000	86,741	19,840	66,901	30.8	7.0	23.8	5.8				
1969	2,896,000	87,210	21,683	65,527	30.1	7.5	22.6	5.1				
1970	2,964,000	90,442	21,828	68,614	30.5	7.4	23.1	0.4				
1971	3,028,000	95,932	21,343	74,589	31.7	7.0	24.7	−3.1				
1972	3,094,000	94,923	23,157	71,766	30.7	7.5	23.2	−1.4				
1973	3,160,000	97,421	24,181	73,240	30.8	7.7	23.1	−1.8				
1974	3,230,000	99,433	23,747	75,686	30.8	7.4	23.4	−1.2				
1975	3,299,000	101,287	26,920	74,367	30.7	8.2	22.5	−1.1				
1976	3,365,000	106,606	27,864	78,742	31.7	8.3	23.4	−3.4				
1977	3,430,000	104,971	28,510	76,461	30.6	8.3	22.3	−3.0				
1978	3,495,000	106,176	28,385	77,791	30.4	8.1	22.3	−3.3				
1979	3,558,000	107,091	29,578	77,513	30.1	8.3	21.8	−3.8				
1980	3,628,000	107,278	30,460	76,818	29.6	8.4	21.2	−1.5				
1981	3,699,000	113,434	29,591	83,843	30.7	8.0	22.7	−3.1				
1982	3,775,000	117,235	29,194	88,041	31.1	7.7	23.4	−2.9				
1983	3,857,000	120,708	30,241	90,467	31.3	7.8	23.5	−1.8				
1984	3,937,000	126,075	32,603	93,472	32.0	8.3	23.7	−3.0	4.16			
1985	4,014,000	128,460	32,332	96,128	32.0	8.1	23.9	−4.3	4.12			
1986	4,093,000	133,728	29,083	104,645	32.7	7.1	25.6	−5.9	4.21			
1987	4,173,000	136,588	30,597	105,991	32.7	7.3	25.4	−5.9	4.20			
1988	4,250,000	133,710	31,879	101,831	31.5	7.5	24.0	−5.5	4.00			
1989	4,327,000	131,508	31,156	100,352	30.4	7.2	23.2	−5.1	3.81			
1990	4,395,000	128,810	30,580	98,230	29.3	7.0	22.3	−6.6	3.63	64.2	72.6	68.4
1991	4,464,000	129,536	30,859	98,677	29.0	6.9	22.1	−6.4	3.58	64.6	72.7	68.7
1992	4,515,000	128,352	32,163	96,189	28.4	7.1	21.3	−9.9	3.52	64.2	72.2	68.2
1993	4,515,000	116,795	34,513	82,282	25.9	7.6	18.3	−18.3	3.15	62.9	71.7	67.3
1994	4,523,000	110,113	37,109	73,004	24.3	8.2	16.1	−14.3	2.95	61.6	70.7	66.1
1995	4,560,000	117,340	36,915	80,425	25.7	8.1	17.6	−9.4	3.12	61.4	70.4	65.9
1996	4,628,000	108,007	34,562	73,445	23.3	7.5	15.8	−0.9	2.73	62.3	71.0	66.7
1997	4,696,000	102,050	34,540	67,510	21.7	7.4	14.3	0.4	2.59	62.6	71.4	67.0
1998	4,769,000	104,183	34,596	69,587	21.8	7.3	14.5	1.0	2.65	63.1	71.2	67.2
1999	4,837,000	104,068	32,850	71,218	21.5	6.8	14.7	−0.4	2.63	65.0	72.6	68.8
2000	4,888,000	96,770	34,111	62,659	19.8	7.0	12.8	−2.3	2.40	64.9	72.4	68.6
2001	4,927,000	98,138	32,677	65,461	19.9	6.6	13.3	−5.3	2.39	65.0	72.6	68.8
2002	4,965,000	101,012	35,235	65,777	20.3	7.1	13.2	−5.5	2.43	64.4	72.1	68.2
2003	5,011,000	105,490	35,941	69,549	21.1	7.2	13.9	−4.6	2.49	64.5	72.2	68.3
2004	5,065,000	109,939	35,061	74,878	21.7	6.9	14.8	−4.0	2.55	64.4	72.3	68.4
2005	5,116,000	109,839	36,992	72,847	21.5	7.2	14.3	−4.2	2.50	64.2	71.9	68.0
2006	5,164,000	120,737	38,566	82,171	23.4	7.5	15.9	−6.5	2.70	63.5	72.1	67.8
2007	5,207,000	123,251	38,180	85,071	23.7	7.3	16.4	−8.1	2.71	63.7	72.3	68.0
2008	5,250,000	127,332	37,710	89,622	24.3	7.2	17.1	−8.8	2.76	64.5	72.6	68.6
2009	5,383,000	135,494	35,898	99,596	25.2	6.7	18.5	6.8	2.88	65.2	73.2	69.2
2010	5,448,000	146,123	36,174	109,949	26.8	6.6	20.2	−8.1	3.06	65.3	73.5	69.4
2011	5,552,000	149,612	35,941	113,671	27.0	6.5	20.5	−1.4	3.09	65.7	73.7	69.7
2012	5,663,000	154,918	36,186	118,732	27.4	6.4	21.0	−1.0	3.15	66.1	74.1	70.1
2013	5,777,000	155,520	34,880	120,640	26.9	6.0	20.9	−0.8	3.11	66.3	74.3	70.3
2014	5,895,000	161,813	35,564	126,249	27.5	6.0	21.5	−1.1	3.19	66.5	74.5	70.5
2015	6,019,000	163,452	34,808	128,644	27.2	5.8	21.4	−0.4	3.19	66.7	74.8	70.8
2016	6,140,000	158,160	33,475	124,685	25.8	5.5	20.3	−0.2	3.06	67.0	75.1	71.1
2017	6,257,000	153,620	33,166	120,454	24.6	5.3	19.3	−0.2	2.95	67.2	75.4	71.3
2018	6,389,000	171,149	32,989	138,160	26.8	5.2	21.6	−0.5	3.30	67.4	75.6	71.5
2019	6,524,000	173,484	33,295	140,189	26.6	5.1	21.5	−0.4	3.33	67.6	75.8	71.7
2020	6,636,803	158,112	39,977	118,135	23.8	6.0	17.8	−0.5	3.05	67.8	76.0	71.7
2021	6,747,323	150,164	38,875	111,289	22.3	5.8	16.5	0.2	2.89	67.9	76.1	71.8
2022	7,037,590	150,225	31,401	118,824	21.5	4.5	17.0	26.0	2.81	68.0	76.3	71.9
2023	7,161,900	145,977	31,500	114,477	20.6	4.4	16.2	1.5	2.71	68.2	76.5	72.0
2024	7,281,800	140,419	31,710	108,709	19.4	4.4	15.0	1.5	2.60	68.4	76.6	72.1
2025	7,356,000(e)	140,504	33,428	107,076	19.1	4.6	14.5		2.58			
2026	7,430,000(e)	144,500(e)	33,090(e)	111,410	19.4	4.4	15.0		2.64			

==== Current vital statistics ====
Period	Live births	Deaths	Natural increase
January—September 2025	104,105	24,252	+79,853
January—September 2026	107,158	24,012	+83,146
Difference	▲ +3,053 (+2.93%)	▼ –240 (-0.99%)	▲ +3,293

=== Total fertility rate ===
Region	Crude birth rate	Total fertility rate
Kyrgyzstan	19.1	2.58
Batken	23.4	3.43
Chüy	17.9	2.66
Jalal-Abad	21.7	3.11
Naryn	20.8	3.05
Osh	22.1	3.14
Talas	20.0	3.00
Ysyk-Köl	17.6	2.59
City of Bishkek	12.5	1.32
City of Osh	19.0	2.41

During the Soviet era, fertility in Kyrgyzstan was high (TFR 4 or higher). After independence there was a rapid decrease to 2.4 at the beginning of the 21st century, but the TFR had increased to 3 or higher as of 2010. Since 2020, there is a decrease to 2.6 in 2024.

The differences between nationalities in the number of children are significant: Uzbeks (3.0 children), Tajiks (3.0 children), Turks (2.9), Kyrgyz (2.9), Dungans (2.8), Russians (1.7), Koreans (1.7), Germans (1.8), Ukrainians (2.1), Tatars (2.1), Kazakhs (2.3) and Uyghurs (2.5). The TFR for Russians, Ukrainians, Germans, and Koreans in Kyrgyzstan are considerably higher than in their home countries.

Years	1925	1926	1927	1928	1929	1930	1931	1932	1933	1934
Total Fertility Rate in Kyrgyzstan	6.58	6.44	6.29	6.15	6.00	5.86	5.72	5.57	5.43	5.29

Years	1935	1936	1937	1938	1939	1940	1941	1942	1943	1944
Total Fertility Rate in Kyrgyzstan	5.14	5.00	4.85	4.71	4.57	4.42	4.43	4.43	4.44	4.44

Years	1945	1946	1947	1948	1949
Total Fertility Rate in Kyrgyzstan	4.45	4.45	4.46	4.47	4.47

=== Life expectancy ===
Life expectancy in Kyrgyzstan since 1950

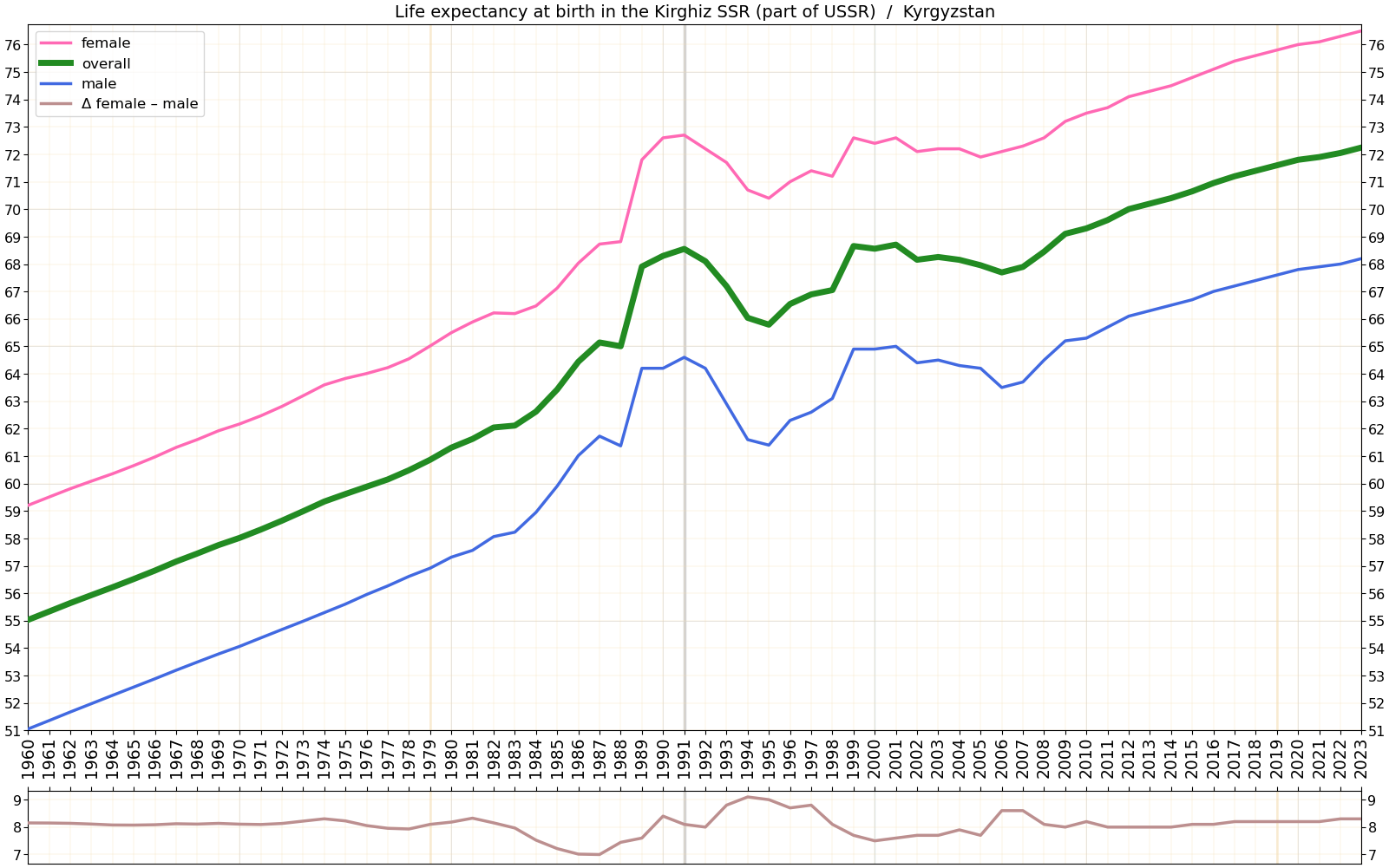
Life expectancy in Kyrgyzstan since 1960 by gender

== Ethnic groups ==
According to the 2022 census, the ethnic composition of the population was as follows: Kyrgyz 77.8%, Uzbeks 14.2%, Russians 3.8%, Dungans 1.0%, Uyghurs 0.5%, other 2.7%, including Tajiks 0.9%, Kazakhs 0.4% and Turks 0.3%. Most Russians, Ukrainians, Tatars, Germans, and Koreans lived in northeast, especially around the city of Karakol. Most of the Dungans and Uyghurs are found along the Chinese border. Most of the Tajiks and Uzbeks live in and around Fergana valley.

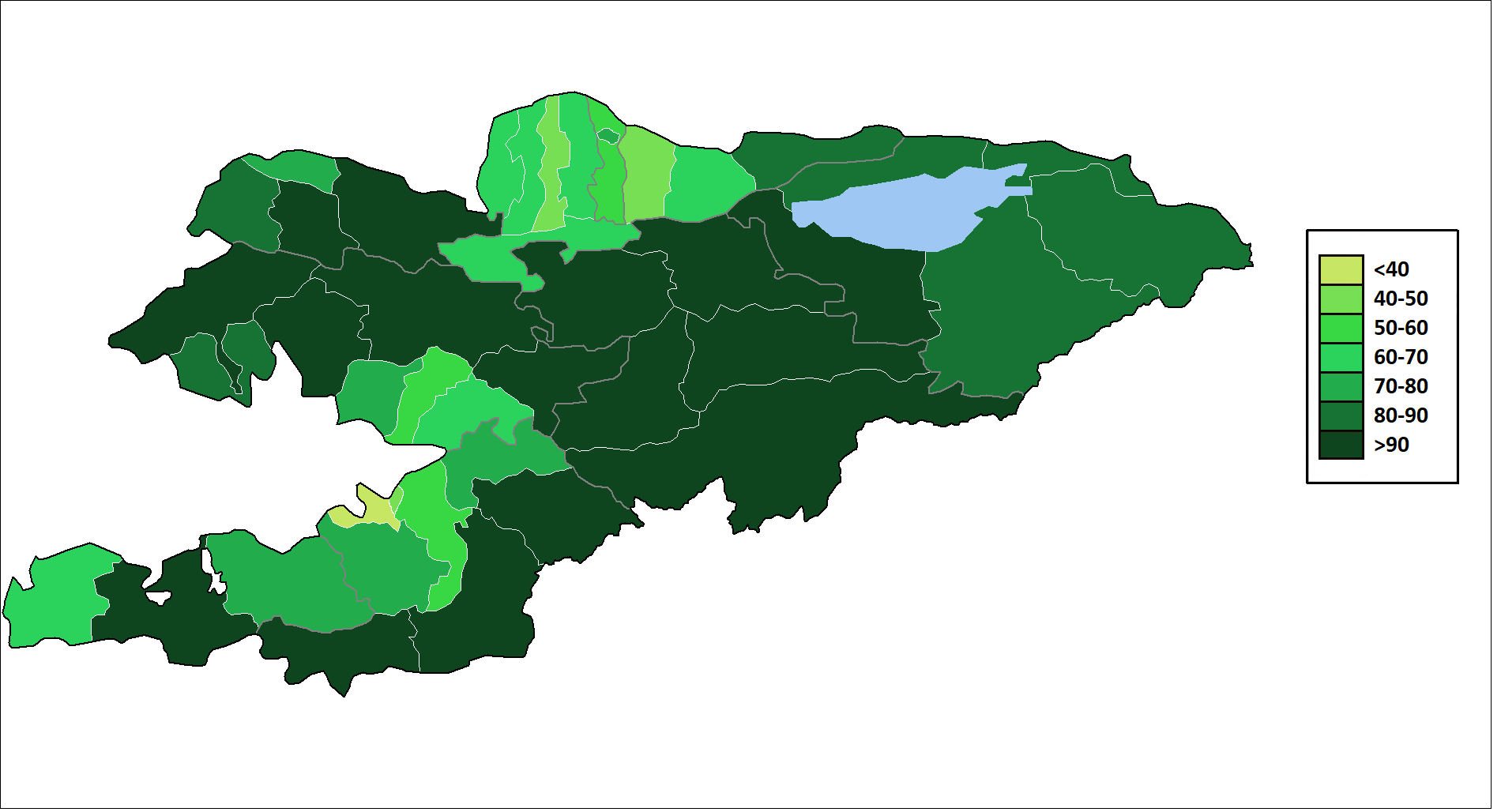
Percentage of Kyrgyz in Kyrgyzstan by region

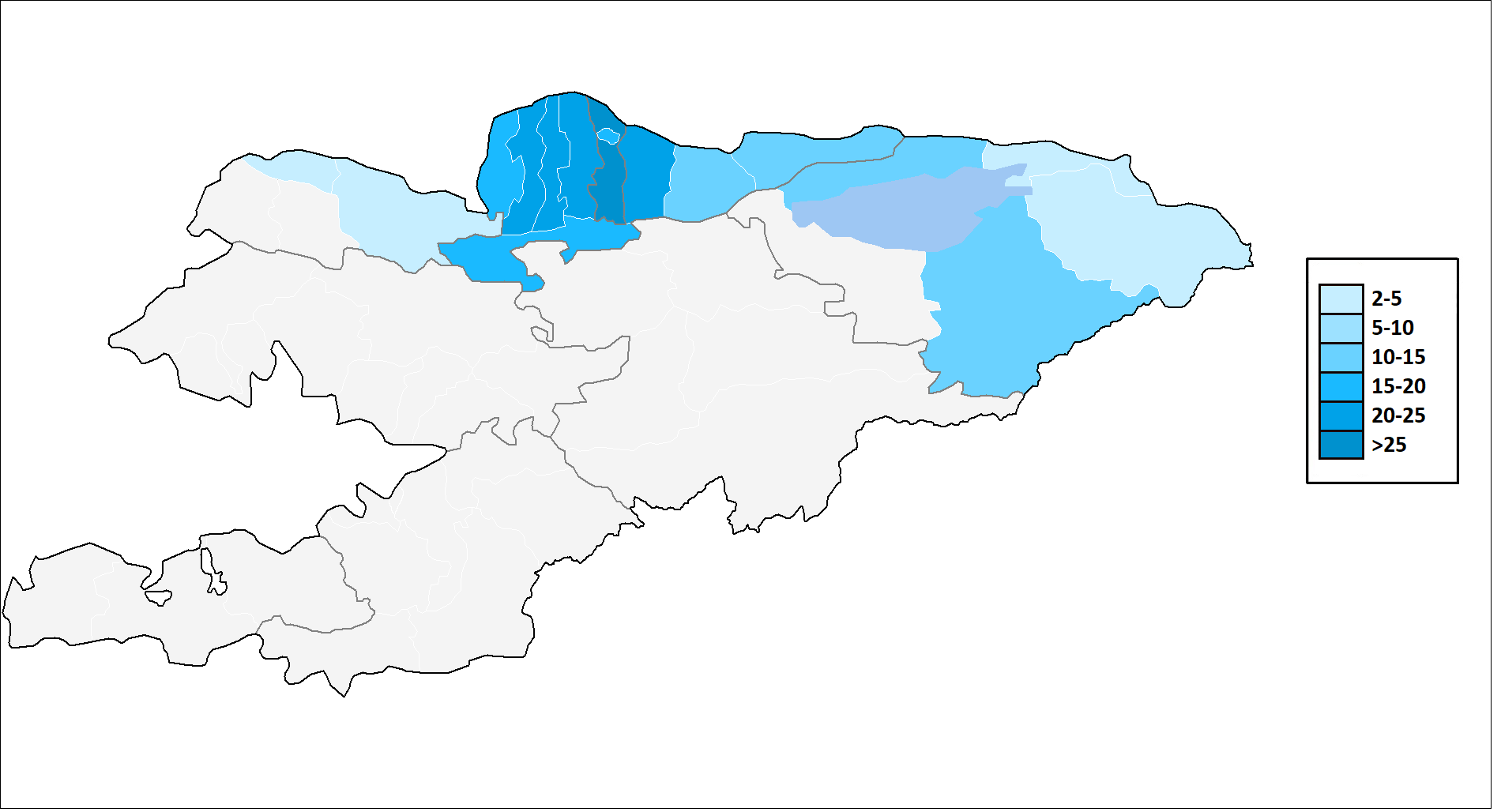
Percentage of Russians in Kyrgyzstan by region

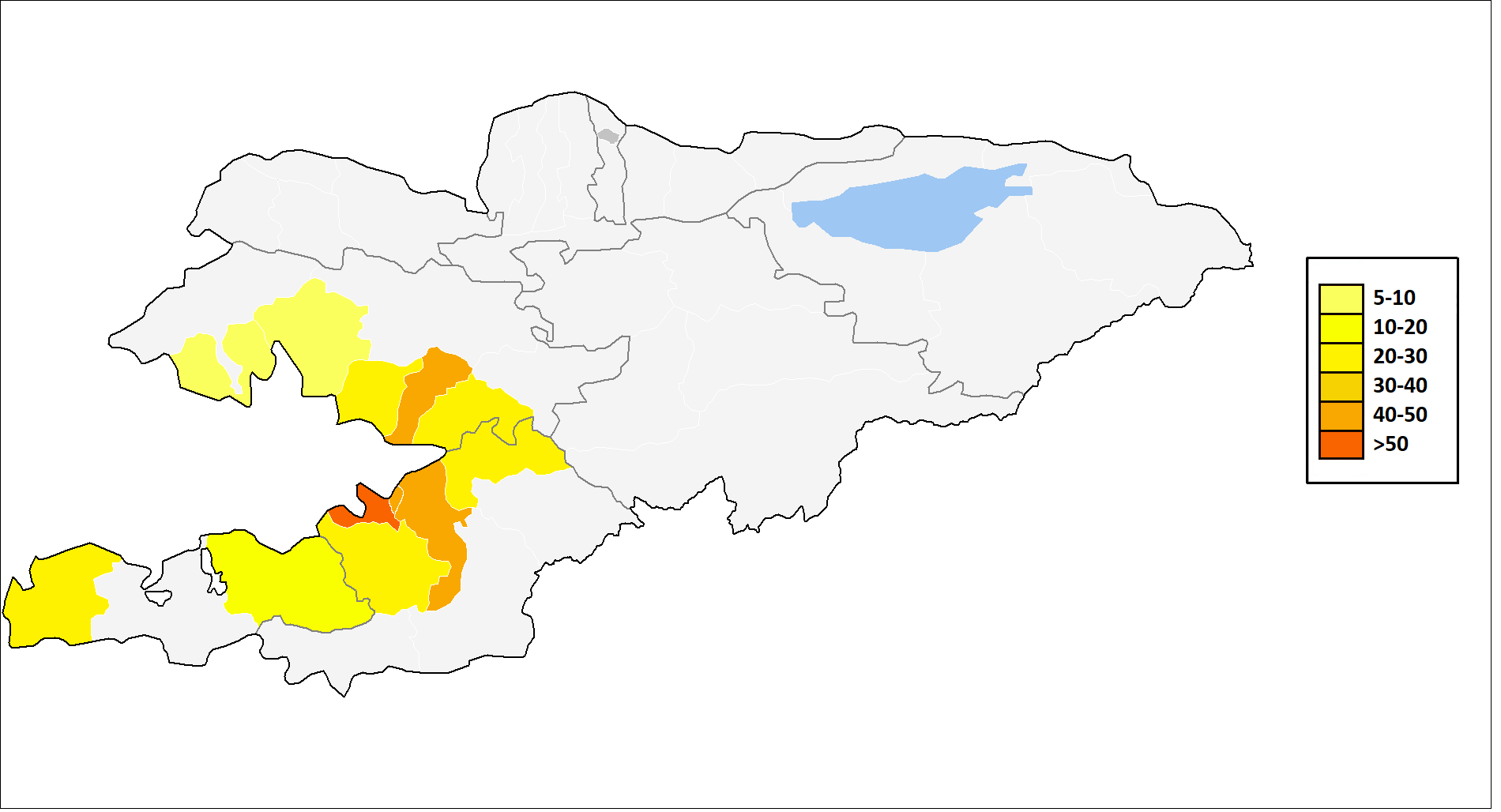
Percentage of Uzbeks in Kyrgyzstan by region

The table shows the ethnic composition of Kyrgyzstan's population according to all population censuses between 1926 and 2022. Due to emigration (and low fertility rates), there has been a sharp decline in the European ethnic groups (Russians, Ukrainians, Germans) and also Tatars since independence (as captured in the 1989, 1999, 2009 and 2022 censuses).

Census year	1926		1939		1959		1970		1979		1989		1999		2009		2022	
Census year	#	%	#	%	#	%	#	%	#	%	#	%	#	%	#	%	#	%
Kyrgyz	661,171	66.60	754,323	51.70	836,831	40.50	1,284,773	43.80	1,687,382	47.90	2,229,663	52.40	3,128,147	64.90	3,804,788	71.00	5,379,020	77.60
Uzbeks	110,463	11.10	151,551	10.40	218,640	10.60	332,638	11.30	426,194	12.10	550,096	12.90	664,950	13.80	768,405	14.30	986,881	14.20
Russians	116,436	11.70	302,916	20.80	623,562	30.20	855,935	29.20	911,703	25.90	916,558	21.50	603,201	12.50	419,583	7.80	282,652	4.10
Dungans	6,004	0.60	5,921	0.40	11,088	0.50	19,837	0.70	26,661	0.80	36,928	0.90	51,766	1.10	58,409	1.10	66,525	1.00
Tajiks	2,667	0.30	10,670	0.70	15,221	0.70	21,927	0.70	23,209	0.70	33,518	0.80	42,636	0.90	46,105	0.90	59,895	0.90
Uyghurs	7,540	0.80	9,412	0.60	13,757	0.70	24,872	0.80	29,817	0.80	36,779	0.90	46,944	1.00	48,543	0.90	31,559	0.50
Kazakhs	1,766	0.20	23,925	1.60	20,067	1.00	21,998	0.80	27,442	0.80	37,318	0.90	42,657	0.90	33,198	0.60	28,244	0.40
Turks	44	0.00	33	0.00	542	0.00	3,076	0.10	5,160	0.10	21,294	0.50	33,327	0.70	39,133	0.70	22,074	0.30
Azeris	3,631	0.40	7,724	0.50	10,428	0.50	12,536	0.40	17,207	0.50	15,775	0.40	14,014	0.30	17,267	0.30	17,359	0.30
Tatars	4,902	0.50	20,017	1.40	56,209	2.70	68,827	2.30	71,744	2.00	70,068	1.60	45,438	0.90	31,424	0.60	11,219	0.20
Kurds	—N/a	—N/a	1,490	0.10	4,783	0.20	7,974	0.30	9,544	0.30	14,262	0.30	11,620	0.20	13,171	0.30	10,733	0.20
Koreans	9	0.00	508	0.00	3,622	0.20	9,404	0.30	14,481	0.40	18,355	0.40	19,784	0.40	17,299	0.30	5,900	0.10
Ukrainians	64,128	6.50	137,299	9.40	137,031	6.60	120,081	4.10	109,324	3.10	108,027	2.50	50,442	1.00	21,924	0.40	3,875	0.10
Germans	4,291	0.40	11,741	0.80	39,915	1.90	89,834	3.10	101,057	2.90	101,309	2.40	21,471	0.40	9,487	0.20	2,831	0.00
Chechens	1	0.00	7	0.00	25,208	1.20	3,391	0.10	2,654	0.10	2,873	0.10	2,612	0.10	1,875	0.00	1,105	0.00
Belarusians	333	0.00	1,520	0.10	4,613	0.20	6,868	0.20	7,676	0.20	9,187	0.20	3,208	0.10	1,394	0.00	391	0.00
Jews	318	0.00	1,895	0.10	8,607	0.40	7,677	0.30	6,836	0.20	6,005	0.10	1,571	0.00	604	0.00	125	0.00
Others	9,300	0.90	17,261	1.20	35,713	1.70	41,157	1.40	44,741	1.30	49,740	1.20	50,770	1.10	43,300	0.80	25,643	0.40
Total	993,004	100	1,458,213	100	2,065,837	100	2,932,805	100	3,522,832	100	4,257,755	100	4,822,938	100	5,362,793	100	6,936,156	100

== Languages ==
Languages spoken at home in Kygyzstan according to World Values Survey in 2020:

- Kyrgyz 70.9%
- Russian 16.3%
- Uzbek 10.7%
- others 2.1% (2020)

In the capital city Bishkek; 55.6% of the population speaks Russian at home, whereas Kyrgyz is the second with 43.6% according to the same survey.

== Religion ==
Religion in Kyrgyzstan (2017 est.)
1. Islam (90.0%)
2. Christianity (7.00%)
3. Jews, Buddhists, Baha’is and Irreligion (3.00%)

Sunni Islam is the predominant religious denomination in Kyrgyzstan. The country has a significant Christian minority which Russian Orthodox is the main denomination.

- Islam 90%
- Christianity 7%
- others 3% (2021)

== See also ==
- Demography of Central Asia
