= Religion in Kyrgyzstan =

Religion in Kyrgyzstan (Pew Research Center 2020)
1. Islam (91.7%)
2. Christianity (5.80%)
3. Unaffiliated (1.20%)
4. Other religions (1.30%)
Religion in Kyrgyzstan (2017 est.)
1. Islam (90%)
2. Christianity (7%)
3. Jews, Buddhists, Baha’is and Irreligion (3%)

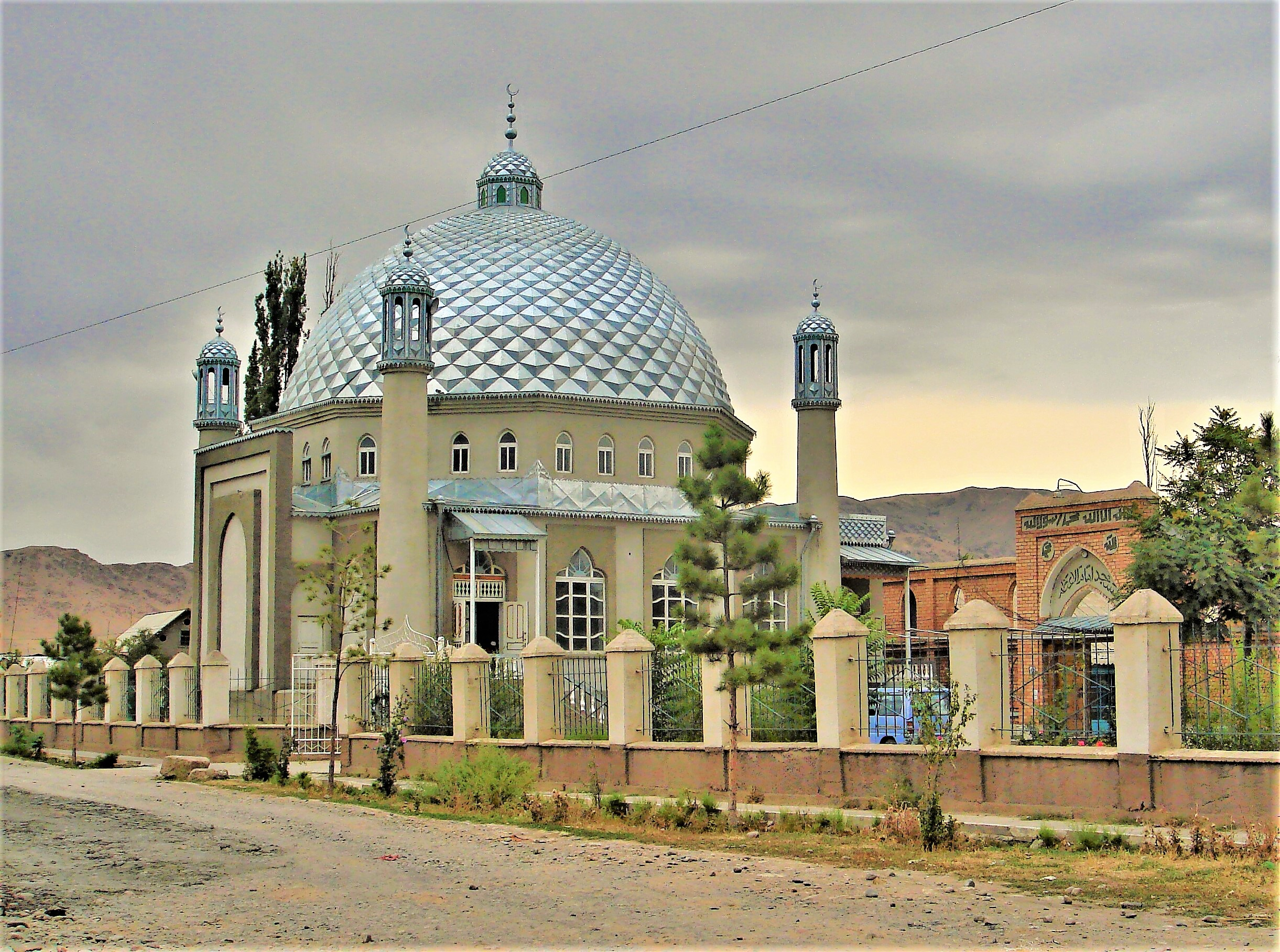
A mosque in Tokmok. Islam is the main religion in Kyrgyzstan.

Islam is the main religion in Kyrgyzstan and the constitution guarantees freedom of religion.

Kyrgyzstan is a multicultural and multi-religious country with Islam, Buddhism, Baháʼí, Christianity (including Russian Orthodox Church, Catholic Church, Seventh-day Adventist Church and Jehovah's Witnesses), Judaism, and other religions all having a presence in the country. Muslims constitute the main religious group in Kyrgyzstan with about 90% of the population as of 2017.

== Religious demography ==
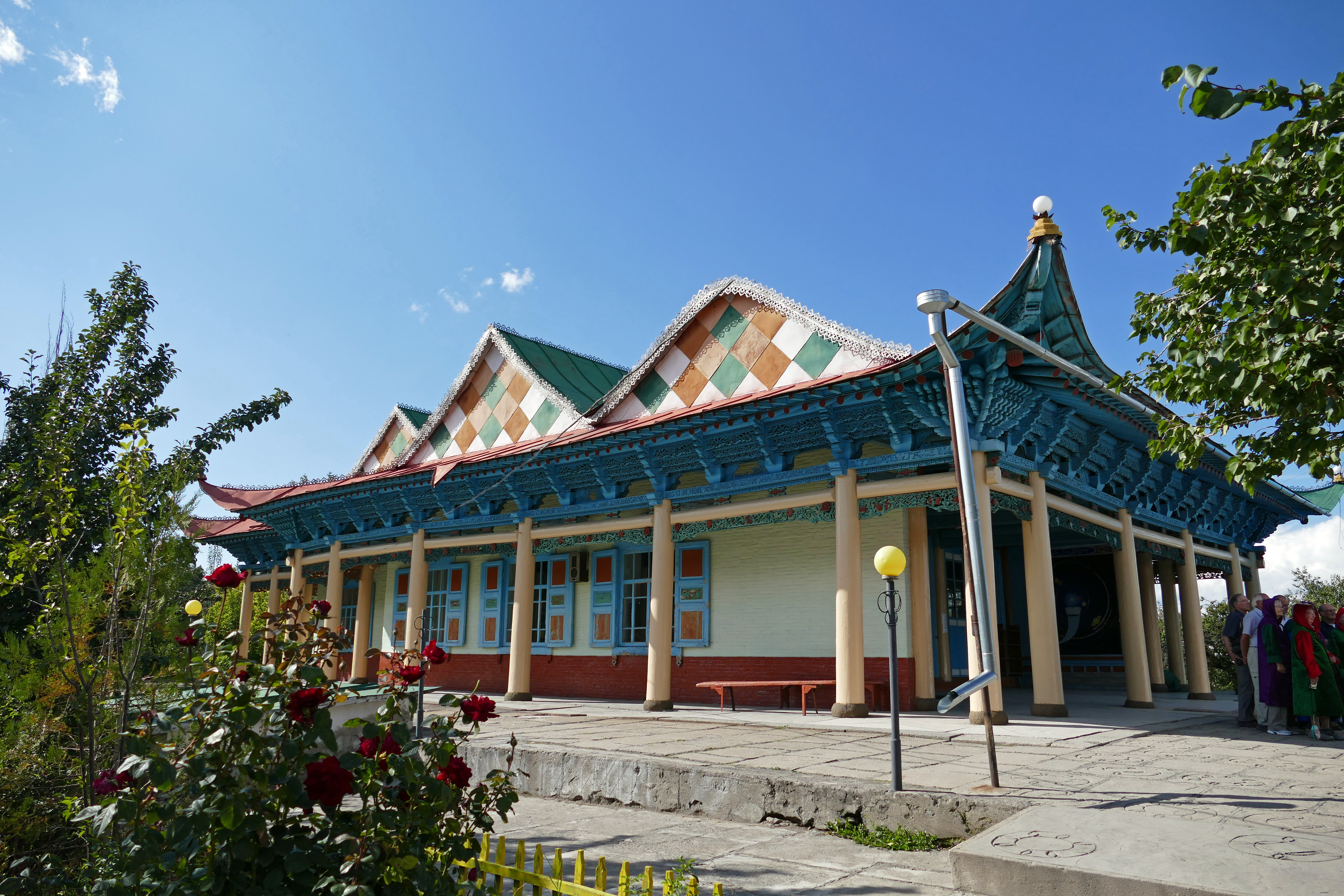
Dungan Mosque in Karakol. Dungans are an ethnic Chinese Muslim group.

Islam is the most widely held faith. The CIA World Factbook estimates that as of 2017, 90% of the population is Muslim, with the majority being Sunni. According to SARA, as of May 2007 there were 1,650 mosques, of which 1,623 were registered. There also were seven institutes for higher Islamic teaching.

According to a survey by World Values Survey, in 2019, 90.7% of the population is Muslim, 7.1% is Christian, 0.3% believes in other religions, 6% has no religious affiliation, and 1.1% refused to answer or does not know.

The CIA Factbook estimates 7 percent of the population are Christian, including 3 percent Russian Orthodox. The country has 44 Russian Orthodox churches, 1 Russian Orthodox monastery for women, 1 parochial school and 1 purpose built Catholic church.

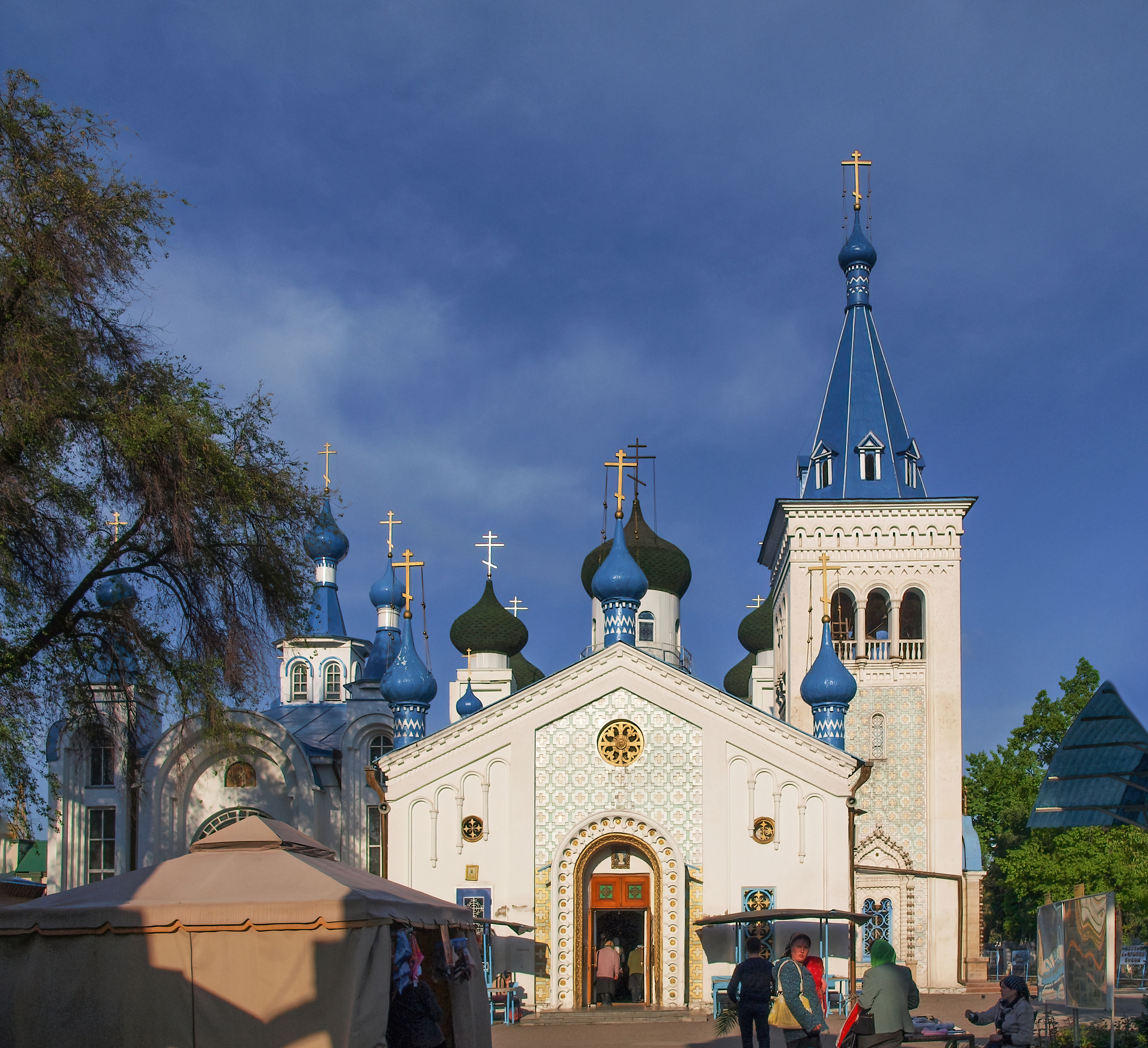
Russian Orthodox cathedral in Bishkek

Other religious groups account for a very small percentage of the population. The Seventh-day Adventist Church operates 30 churches throughout the country. The Roman Catholics hold services mainly in family homes converted into churches, with the Talas church of St. Nicholas of Flüe being the first purpose built Catholic church in Kyrgyzstan and the sole exception. These churches are organised into 6 parishes with missionary priests serving as parish priests since there are currently no native Catholic priests in Kyrgyzstan. The small Jewish community operates one synagogue in Bishkek, and it organizes internal cultural studies and humanitarian services, chiefly food assistance for the elderly and persons with disabilities regardless of faith. One Buddhist temple known as "Chamsen" which exists since 1996 to serves the local small Buddhist community. There are 12 registered houses of worship for the Baháʼí Faith. In addition, there are 240 registered Protestant houses of worship. There is no official estimate of the number of atheists.

Islam is practiced widely throughout the country in both urban and rural areas. Russian Orthodoxy typically is concentrated in cities with a larger ethnic Russian population. Other religious groups more commonly practice in the cities where their smaller communities tend to be concentrated. There is a correlation between ethnicity and religion; primarily Muslim ethnic groups are Kyrgyz (73.5% of the whole population); Uzbeks (14.7%); and Dungans (1.1%); with Uyghurs and others in the remaining 5.2%. Ethnic Russians usually belong to either the Russian Orthodox Church or one of the Protestant denominations. However, some Christian pastors noted that the number of ethnic Kyrgyz converts to Christianity grew significantly during the year covered by this report. Religious practice in the south of the country is more traditional and devout than in the north part. Some scholars estimated the total number of Muslim background Kyrgyz converts to Christianity between 25,000 to 50,000.

Missionary groups operate freely in the country. SARA has registered missionaries from all over the world representing an estimated 20 religious groups and denominations. According to SARA, since 1996 it has registered 1,133 missionaries, of whom 263 were Muslim and the rest represented other, mostly Christian, religious groups. During the period covered by this report, there were 111 registered missionaries, of whom 80 were Christian and 31 were Muslim. Missionaries disseminating dogma inconsistent with the traditional customs of local Muslims are subject to expulsion. According to SARA, of the approximately 20 missionaries expelled since 1991, all represented various "totalitarian sects", groups the SCRA considered incompatible with the standard principles of traditional world religious groups.

== Status of religious freedom ==
=== Legal and policy framework ===
The Constitution and the law provide for freedom of religion; however, the Government restricted the activities of radical Islamic groups it considered to be threats to security. The Constitution provides for the separation of religion and state. The new Constitution, adopted on 30 December 2006, defines the country as a sovereign, unitary, democratic social state based on the rule of law; the previous Constitution had also defined the country as "secular". A 6 May 2006 decree recognized Islam and Russian Orthodoxy as "traditional religious groups".

Article 5 of the "Law On Religious Freedom and Religious Organizations" affirms that "the State does not interfere with the activity of religious organizations that adhere to established laws; does not allow for establishing advantages or restrictions of one religion over another; does not finance the activity of religious organizations and activity of propagating Atheism."

Article 8 of the Constitution prohibits the formation of political parties on religious and ethnic grounds, as well as activities of religious organizations that jeopardize the state, constitutional system, or national security. Article 85 of the Constitution provides the Constitutional Court with the authority to determine the constitutionality of a religious organization's activities.

The Government recognizes two Muslim holy days (Kurman Ait or Eid al-Adha, and Orozo Ait or Eid al-Fitr) and one Russian Orthodox holy day (Orthodox Christmas) as national holidays. The President and the Government send greetings to Muslims and Orthodox adherents on their major holy days, and the greetings are printed in the mass media.

Established in 1993, the Muftiate (or Spiritual Administration of Muslims of Kyrgyzstan-SAMK) is the highest Islamic managing body in the country. The Muftiate oversees all Islamic entities, including institutes and madrassahs, mosques, and Islamic organizations. The Mufti is the official head of the Muftiate and is elected by the Council of Ulemas, which consists of 30 Islamic clerics and scholars. A Muftiate-established commission reviews and standardizes Islamic educational literature printed and distributed in the country and reviews new books on Islamic themes prior to publication. The Muftiate has the authority to ban publications that do not meet the established standards, an initiative it started and the Government supports.

SARA is responsible under the law for promoting religious tolerance, protecting freedom of conscience, and overseeing the application of laws on religion. The President appoints the Director, and the Prime Minister appoints the deputies of the agency. In June 2006 SARA moved its offices to the city of Osh in the south to be closer to the more religious part of the country.

A 1997 presidential decree requires the registration of all religious organizations with the Ministry of Justice (MOJ), following approval from SARA. SARA can deny or postpone the certification of a particular religious group if SARA believes the proposed activities of that group are not religious in character. Unregistered religious organizations are prohibited from actions such as renting space and holding religious services, although many hold regular services without government interference.

Organizations applying for registration must have at least 10 members who are adult citizens and must submit an application form, organizational charter, minutes of an institutional meeting, and a list of founding members to SARA for review. SARA then provides a recommendation to the MOJ for approval or rejection of the registration application. Recommendation for rejection occurs when a religious organization does not comply with the law or is a threat to national security, social stability, interethnic and interdenominational harmony, public order, health, or morality. An applicant whose registration is denied may reapply and may appeal to the courts. The registration process with SARA is often cumbersome, taking a month to several years for completion. Each congregation must register separately.

If approved, a religious organization then must complete the registration process with the MOJ to obtain status as a legal entity, which is necessary to own property, open bank accounts, and otherwise engage in contractual activities. If a religious organization engages in commercial activity, it is required to pay taxes. In practice the MOJ has never registered a religious organization without prior approval by SARA. SARA reported that its staff continued to travel around the country to help unregistered religious entities prepare applications for registration.

According to SARA, there were 2,113 registered religious entities, including mosques, churches, foundations, non-governmental organizations (NGOs) of a religious nature, and religious educational institutions. SARA identified 1,742 Islamic entities, 46 entities of the Russian Orthodox Church, and 304 other "nontraditional" houses of worship, including 2 Russian churches of "Old Belief", 3 Catholic churches, 1 synagogue, 1 Buddhist temple, and 297 Protestant churches (48 Baptist, 21 Lutheran, 49 Pentecostal, 30 Adventist, 35 Presbyterian, 43 "Charismatic", 49 Jehovah's Witnesses, and 22 "other" Protestant churches). According to SARA, there are 21 "other religious entities" including 12 Baháʼí centers, 21 religious centers of "other foreign confessions", 13 religious schools, and 7 religious foundations and unions.

Members of registered religious groups may fulfill alternative military service; it was reported in the press in 2005 that approximately three thousand persons apply annually.

Missionaries of various religious groups operate freely, although they are required to register. Since 1996 SARA has registered more than 1,133 foreign citizens as religious missionaries. All religious entities founded by a foreigner must re-register each year with SARA, although the process is much less cumbersome than the initial registration. Missionaries are only required to register with SARA once.

The 1997 Law on Religious Freedom and Religious Organizations forbids the teaching of religion (or Atheism) in public schools. In 2001 the Government instructed the SCRA to draw up programs for training clergy and to prepare methodologies for teaching about religious groups in public schools. These instructions came in response to concerns about the spread of Wahhabism and what the Government considered unconventional religious sects. The SCRA turned to a number of religious organizations for their ideas on introducing religious education; their reaction generally was negative, as they preferred to retain responsibility for the religious education of their adherents. SARA indicated that it was still developing a curriculum to teach about religious groups, in cooperation with the Ministry of Education and several academic institutions. An 9 August 2006 press report indicated that the Government planned to introduce religious education into the secondary school curriculum; however, there had been no implementation of this plan by the end of 2007. Under the auspices of the Muftiate, volunteers called Davatchi visited villages in the south to teach traditional Islamic values.

The Islamic University oversees all Islamic schools, including madrassahs, to develop a standardized curriculum and curb the spread of extremist religious teaching.

Since 2001 the Government has worked with representatives of various religious groups and NGOs on a draft law "On Freedom of Conscience and Religious Organizations", ostensibly in response to concerns about terrorism and other illegal activities committed by groups disguised as religious organizations. In May 2006, a group of parliamentary deputies proposed a different draft bill.

The August 2005 law on "Countering Extremist Activity" seeks to "halt extremist activities by religious organizations or groups." Law enforcement officials have acted under this law to detain members of banned organizations, such as Hizb-ut Tahrir (HT), for distributing leaflets and other materials deemed to be of an extremist nature.

=== Restrictions on religious freedom ===
The Government continued to express concern publicly about groups that it viewed as extremist because of either radical religious or political agendas. The Government was particularly concerned about the threat of political Islam, whose followers (Islamists) it labels "Wahhabists". The Government perceives radical Islamists to be a threat to national stability, particularly in the south, and fears that they seek to overthrow the government and establish an Islamic theocracy. Armed incursions in 1999 and 2000 by members of the Islamic Movement of Uzbekistan (IMU), a terrorist organization, and more recent incursions by unidentified terrorists in May 2006 increased the Government's concern regarding political Islam and the actions of militant Islamic groups.

In 2003 the Supreme Court sustained the ban on four political organizations, imposed because of extremism and alleged ties to international terrorist organizations: Hizb ut-Tahrir (HT), the Islamic Party of Turkestan, the Organization for Freeing Eastern Turkestan, and the Eastern Turkestan Islamic Party.

Several religious groups had difficulties registering. The Church of Jesus Christ of Latter-day Saints (Mormons), which initially applied for registration with SARA in August 2004, was still not registered at the end of 2007. Leaders of the Hare Krishna temple in Bishkek, after attempting unsuccessfully to register several times in the last 2 years, planned to resubmit the application for registration once the location of their new temple was confirmed.

Several churches in Tash-Kumyr, At-Bashi, Osh, and Jalalabad continue to wait for registration, despite numerous meetings with SARA officials and submissions of applications. Church leaders attributed previous delays to the submission of improper documentation and information during the application process. On 1 December 2006, SARA refused registration of the Baptist Church in Kara-Kulja, citing the local population's petition to SARA to prevent the church from staying open (see section 3).

According to church officials, the local community and government officials attempted to pressure Dzhanybek Zhakipov, the pastor of the Pentecostal Church of Jesus Christ in Jalalabad, to close down his church in July 2006. Local law enforcement officials reportedly "tormented" the pastor after receiving complaints by relatives of Christian converts who belonged to his church. SARA officials showed the pastor a petition with 500 signatures requesting that the church be shut down. After court proceedings, a Jalalabad judge ordered SARA to register the church. The church continued to operate, and there were no reports of further pressure.

The Unification Church remained active, despite the SCRA suspension of its activities in 2003 for registration irregularities, a ruling upheld in an appeal to the Bishkek City Court.

Although the Government monitored, including by filming, Protestant and Muslim religious groups in the past, there were no reports of surveillance during the period covered by this report. There were unconfirmed reports that law enforcement officials monitored the activities of missionaries.

In 2007, a Baptist pastor reported several cases of their foreign missionaries being denied visas or facing visa delays when attempting to visit the country.

On 21 February 2007, news agency Ferghana.ru reported that school administrators and teachers at the Kyzyljar School of the Jalalabad Oblast prohibited two female students from attending class because the students refused to remove their hijabs. A similar incident occurred in a neighboring village. Parents at both schools protested the prohibition of hijabs but the dispute continued throughout 2007. In December 2005 the Jalalabad city education department banned the wearing of hijabs in that city's schools. Several parents protested the move and demanded that the ban be lifted. SARA's stated position was that students, who for religious reasons choose to wear clothing that would indicate adherence to a particular religion, may attend religious schools.

According to news agency RFE/RL, Mutakalim, a Muslim women's NGO, requested a change in the legislation that bans females from wearing Islamic headscarves in official passport photos. The Government defended the current law as being a national security measure and rejected a petition from the group for lacking a sufficient number of signatures.

On 10 March 2007, State National Safety Committee (GKNB) officers in Jalalabad seized a warehouse containing Bibles owned by a Baptist church. The authorities told church administrators that the seizure was for the purpose of "expert examination". The GKNB refused to release the warehouse as of the end of 2007.

=== Abuses of religious freedom ===
On 6 August 2006, the special forces of the National Security Service (SNB) shot and killed three persons, including Mukhammadrafiq Kamalov, imam of the largest mosque in Kara-Suu. Immediately following the incident, government officials stated that the three were affiliated with the banned Islamic Movement of Uzbekistan (IMU) and were killed in the course of an antiterrorism operation. Kamalov's family and observers, including the ombudsman for human rights, denied security officials' allegations about the possible involvement of the imam in religious extremist groups. Security officials later conceded that Kamalov might not have been part of the group but instead may have been kidnapped by the suspected terrorists and thus killed accidentally in the raid. On 24 May 2006, security forces had detained Kamalov and searched his house on suspicion of his involvement in HT activities.

On several occasions during the period covered by this report, police arrested or fined members of the Islamic political organization HT for distributing leaflets. On 21 February 2007, local media reported that police detained a resident of Osh after discovering HT booklets and a hand grenade in his home.

Of the 12 men arrested in April 2006 for alleged links to a November 2004 grenade incident blamed on Islamic extremists, 4 remained in custody. It was unclear whether their detention was linked to their religious beliefs or practice.

=== Improvements and Positive Developments in Respect for Religious Freedom ===
In 2006 the Church of Jesus Christ signed a 49-year lease for land upon which its church is located after favorably resolving an ongoing dispute with the Bishkek mayor's office.

== Societal abuses and discrimination ==
There was no evidence of widespread societal discrimination or violence against members of different religious groups; however, there was evidence of periodic tension in rural areas between conservative Muslims and foreign Christian missionaries and individuals from traditionally Muslim ethnic groups who had converted to other religious groups. There were several reports that tensions between Muslims and Muslim converts continued. Both Muslim and Russian Orthodox spiritual leaders criticized the proselytizing activities of nontraditional Christian groups.

Several media outlets reported incidents of aggression against Baptist Pastor Zulumbek Sarygulov in Osh Oblast. According to Forum 18, the first incident occurred on 28 July 2006 when a crowd of 80 local Muslims broke into the Karakulja village Baptist Church in the Osh Oblast. The mob physically abused the pastor and burned his Bibles and other religious materials. Church leaders reported that local police on the scene made no efforts to stop the attack. Soon after the event, local police opened a criminal investigation, questioning Sarygulov and others for detailed accounts of the incident. After the initial inquiries, there were no further reports from the local authorities regarding developments in the investigation.

In a second incident on 12 November 2006, perpetrators threw Molotov cocktails at Sarygulov's church facilities, but church staff quickly extinguished the flames, and the fire caused little damage. Local authorities investigated the event but made no arrests.

On 1 December 2006, according to Forum 18, SARA notified Aleksandr Nikitin, pastor of the Baptist church in Osh and regional coordinator for Baptist churches in the south, that the Karakulja church had been officially denied registration on the grounds that it operated for several years without having official registration. On 5 March 2007, a law enforcement official showed Forum 18 reporters a letter from SARA requesting that the police end the Karakulja Baptist church activities. The authorities took no further action as of the end of 2007.

On 15 February 2007, independently operated Channel 5 TV broadcast a program that portrayed the Church of Jesus Christ as being possibly associated with devil worshipers. The pastor provided a rebuttal to the program, but producers never aired it. Channel 5 producers aired opinions in support of the program's message presented by representatives of the "traditional religious groups" (Islam and Russian Orthodoxy).

Several Protestant pastors complained of difficulties interring deceased parishioners who converted from Islam to Christianity. Local Islamic and community leaders opposed the burial of converts in Islamic cemeteries. Officially, the cemetery plots are under government control, but usually local Islamic figures oversee them. The Government resolved the problem by allotting new plots of land for Protestant cemeteries. However, the scarcity of such cemeteries forces Christians to travel great distances to bury their deceased.

== Freedom of religion ==
In 2023, the country scored 2 out of 4 for religious freedom according to Freedom House; difficulties included registering with the government and some police harassment. Social discrimination is also reported.

In summer 2022, Bishkek city council rescinded an eviction notice against Kyrgyzstan's only private Jewish school, after communications from the government. The issue apparently led to harassment and anti-semitic comments on social media, including posts from several council members.

In 2022, the government arrested at least 39 suspected members of Hizb ut-Tahrir; in 2021, nine were detained.

== See also ==
- Demographics of Kyrgyzstan
- Human rights in Kyrgyzstan
- History of the Jews in Kyrgyzstan

== Sources ==
- United States Bureau of Democracy, Human Rights and Labor. Kyrgyzstan: International Religious Freedom Report 2007. This article incorporates text from this source, which is in the public domain.
- Forum 18 Religious Freedom Survey, December 2009
