= Christianity in Kyrgyzstan =

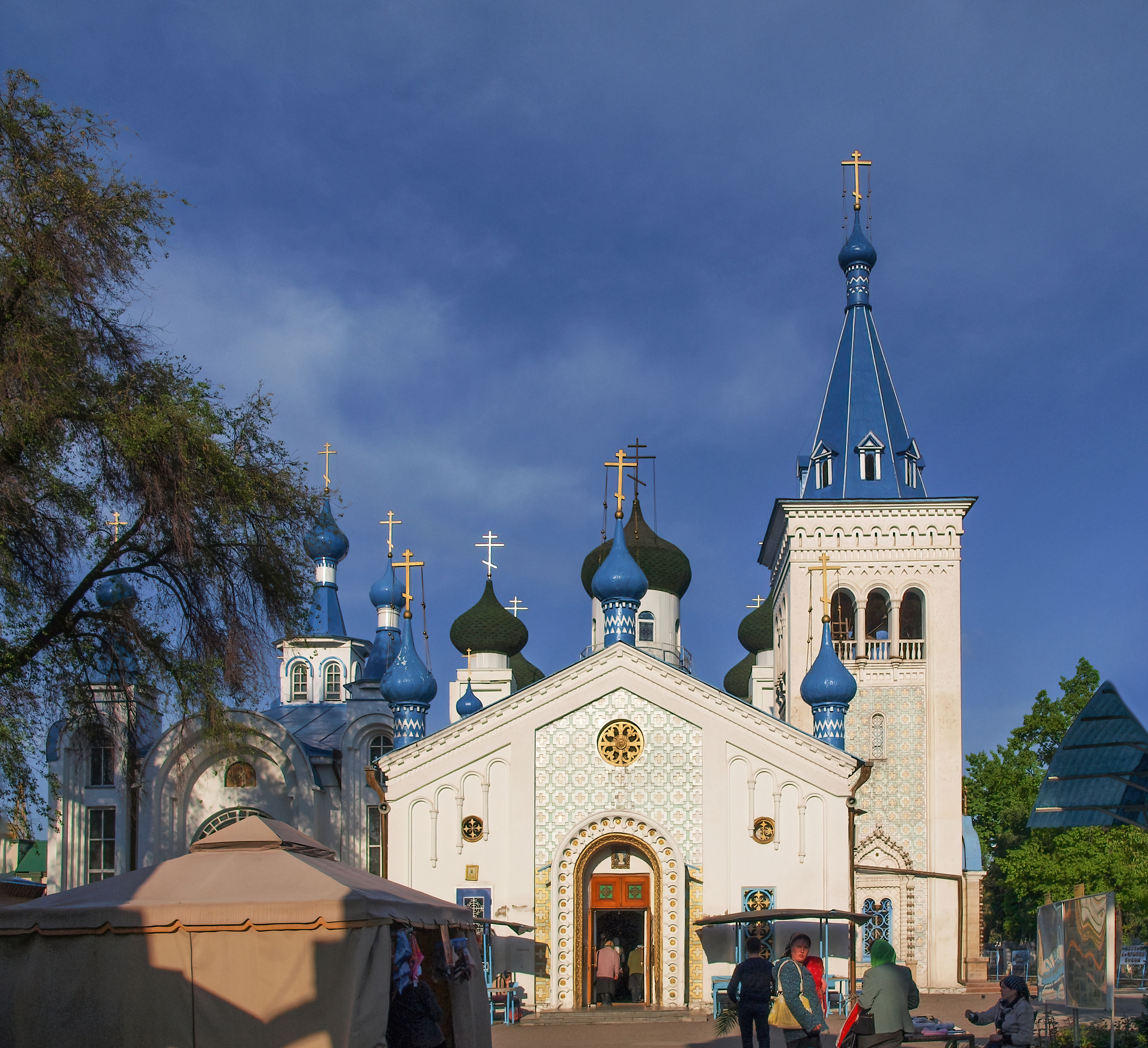
Russian Orthodox cathedral in Bishkek

Christianity has a long history in Kyrgyzstan, with the earliest archaeological remains of churches belonging to the Church of the East in modern-day Suyab dating back to the 7th century. By the 9th century an archdiocese of the Church of the East cared for the Christians of Kyrgyzstan and adjacent areas in eastern Turkestan. Although primarily Turkic there was also an Armenian community in what today is Kyrgyzstan by the 14th century. By the 15th century, however, there were no longer ecclesiastical structures of any church caring for what is today Kyrgyzstan and Islam gained the ascendancy amongst the Kyrgyz people.

== Demographics ==
According to government estimates, approximately 7 percent of the population is Christian. Of this they estimate 40 percent (about 2.8 percent of the population) to be Russian Orthodox, while the remaining 60 percent (4.2 percent of the population) from non-Orthodox denominations (primarily Protestant). At least 92,000 Christians are from majority Muslim ethnic groups.

Of the approximately 355 officially registered Christian churches in Kyrgyzstan, Pentecostal congregations form the largest Protestant group, with 72 churches (including Christian of Evangelical Faith and 19 Assembly of God among others), followed by Baptists (most of which are affiliated with the Union of Evangelical Christian Baptists of Kyrgyzstan) with 59 churches. Both Pentecostal and Baptist churches are present in all regions of the country, with the highest concentration in Bishkek and the Chüy Region.

Other registered Christian groups include 48 Presbyterian churches, 39 Charismatic churches, 25 non-denominational Protestant or Evangelical congregations, 25 Seventh-day Adventist congregations, 20 Lutheran churches, and 8 Catholic parishes.

Nearly all Lutheran congregations are affiliated with the Evangelical Lutheran Church in the Kyrgyz Republic. As of 2017, two of the Lutheran congregations held services in Kyrgyz, while most others primarily used Russian, with some elements—such as creeds, the Lord’s Prayer, or worship songs—conducted in German or Kyrgyz.

The Russian Orthodox Church accounts for 49 registered churches, including communities belonging to Old Believer and Pomortsy traditions. Most Orthodox in Kyrgyzstan are ethnic Russians.

For many years there was also a Beyt Yeshua (Бейт Иешуа) Messianic church, though it is no longer registered and unclear if it still exits.

Discrimination against Christians has been reported in 2022.

Besides churches there are also seven registered Protestant seminars or Bible colleges.

== Orthodox Christian Church ==
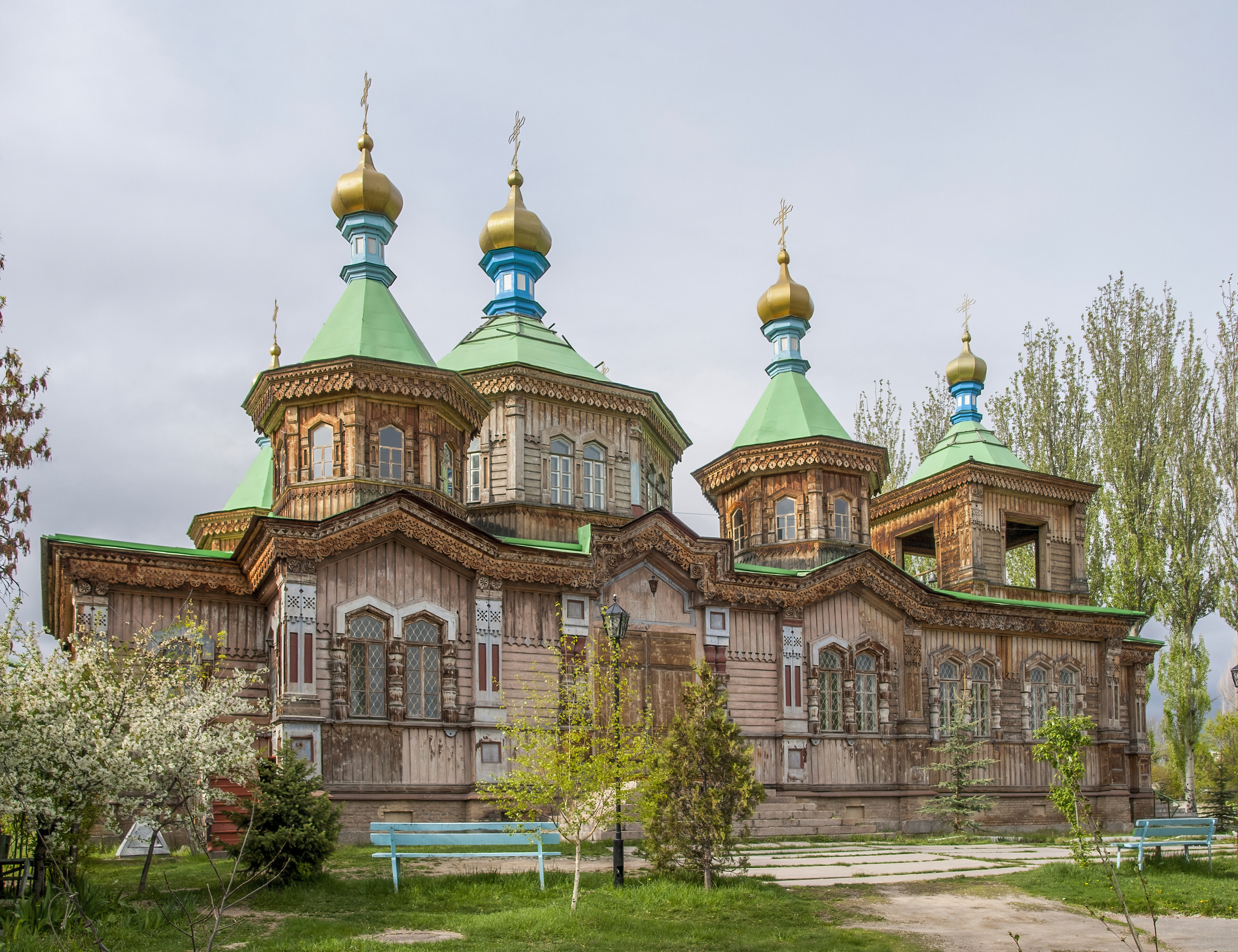
Russian Orthodox Church of the Holy Trinity in Karakol, Kyrgyzstan.

The modern history of Orthodoxy in Kyrgyzstan dates back to the country's incorporation into the Russian Empire in the late 19th century. The first parishes in Kyrgyzstan were opened in Bishkek, Naryn, and Osh in the 1870s to serve the Russian forts being built in the country. The military parishes were eventually recognized as regular parishes as the Russian Orthodox Church presence in Kyrgyzstan grew. In 1871 the Holy Synod of the Russian Orthodox Church established a diocese - the Eparchy of Tashkent and Turkestan - for its new communities in Central Asia, with the new parishes in Kyrgyzstan coming under its authority. By the time of the Russian Revolution in 1917 there were over 30 churches in what today is Kyrgyzstan. It was also home to one of three Orthodox monasteries in Central Asia at the time, Holy Trinity Monastery on the shores of Ysyk-Köl.

During the Soviet era Orthodoxy in Kyrgyzstan suffered from persecution as it did elsewhere in the USSR. Clergy and laity alike were murdered by the new authorities and many churches were closed and destroyed. As part of the easing of the persecutions during World War II many churches were reopened, with thirty-two active in Kyrgyzstan by 1946. Eight were later closed in the renewed persecutions under Khrushchev.

Since the collapse of the Soviet Union the number of Orthodox parishes in Kyrgyzstan has nearly doubled to forty-four. A new women's monastery has also been established in Kara-Balta in northern Kyrgyzstan. In 2011 the Holy Synod of the Russian Orthodox Church decided to separate the Orthodox Church in Kyrgyzstan from the Eparchy of Tashkent and establish it as its own diocese, the Eparchy of Bishkek under the Bishop of Bishkek and Kyrgyzstan. The new diocese was included in the Russian Orthodox Church's Ecclesiastical province of Central Asia.

== Catholic Church ==
The Catholic Church has been mentioned in this region since the 14th century, mainly in the territory of today’s Kazakhstan. The Catholic missionaries came to Kyrgyzstan mainly from China, until the turn of the 19th and 20th centuries. From 1918 to 1930, the area of Kyrgyzstan came under the parish of Tashkent. In 1937, a persecution of Catholic Church began, and the churches were destroyed and all priests were deported or executed. In that time, because of mass deportations into Central Asia (that had no parallel even in the tsar era), an influx of Catholics arrived from the Volga area, Ukraine, Poland and Baltic Sea area. On 13 May 1991, the apostolic administration of Kazakhstan and Central Asia was created and included five post-Soviet Central Asian republics, from which four gained a status of mission sui iuris later – the church in Kyrgyzstan did so on 22 December 1997. Sui iuris means that it is an autonomous unit – an independent juristic person, based on its own discipline, heritage, or culture – but it is in full communion with the Pope in Rome.

On 18 March 2006, the apostolic administration in Kyrgyzstan was founded (defined as a region under the administration of any clergyman authorised by the pope), now under the administration of bishop Nicolas Messmer, who was born (similarly as his predecessor in the administration of Kyrgyzstan Alexander Kan) in Kazakh's Karaghanda. The relationship to Kazakh's bishopric is very strong, and the Catholic literature and hymnals are printed in Kazakhstan.

In the capital, Bishkek, there is a church (among the associated societies belong e.g. Belovodskoe, Chaldybar, Tuz, Nurmanbet, Ivanovka, Iskra, Niznevostochnoe, Kamyshanovka, Oktjabrskoe), and the worships in Talas take place in a bought house, there was also a newly founded parish on the south of Kyrgyzstan (Jalal Abad and Osh) too, and another parish is in Karakol.

In Bishkek, up to now, the Catholic Church has been associated with the German population and therefore the church used to be marked as "German" by the Kyrgyz (Russian: немецкая церковь) – contrary to the Orthodox church, which is considered "Russian" (русская церковь). Among the visitors of the church (except the foreigners) are Bishkek citizens of German origin (although they do not speak German), and there are also descendants of Poles.

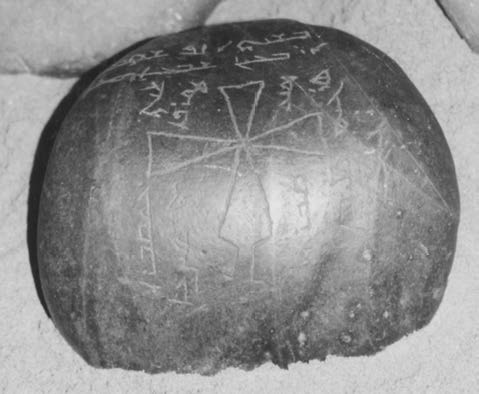
Gravestone from Kyrgyzstan (thirteenth/fourteenth century) with Syriac Christian inscriptions.

== See also ==
- Religion in Kyrgyzstan
- Roman Catholicism in Kyrgyzstan
- Bible translations into Kyrgyz
