= List of mosques in Kyrgyzstan =

The vast majority of people in Kyrgyzstan are Muslims; as of 2020, 90% of the country's population were followers of Islam. As of 2015, there have been more than 2000 mosques in Kyrgyzstan. This is a listing of notable mosques in Kyrgyzstan (Arabic: Masjid), including Islamic places of worship that do not qualify as traditional mosques.

== List of mosques ==
Name	City	State/Region	Year	Notes
Osh New Mosque	Osh	Osh Region	2012	
Bishkek Central Mosque	Bishkek	Chüy Region	2018	Largest mosque of Central Asia and Kyrgyzstan.
Makhmud Kashkari Mosque	Bishkek	Chüy Region	2017	
Dungan Mosque	Karakol	Issyk-Kul Region	2010	
Azret Ali Mosque	Naryn	Naryn Region	1995	
Abdulkarim Satuq Bughra Khan Mosque	Bishkek	Chüy Region	2015	Situated in the campus of Kyrgyz-Turkish Manas University.

== See also ==
- Islam in Kyrgyzstan
- Lists of mosques
- Lists of mosques in Asia
