= Ahmadiyya in Kyrgyzstan =

Islamic movement

Ahmadiyya is an Islamic community in Kyrgyzstan, whose teachings were first brought into the country by foreign Pakistani missionaries in the early 1990s. Although the Community was first registered in the country in 2002, its registration was struck off with the country's State Commission on Religious Affairs refusing to re-register it in 2011. Today, the Community which faces religious persecution, represents up to 1000 members spread across the capital Bishkek and three other regions of the country.

== History ==
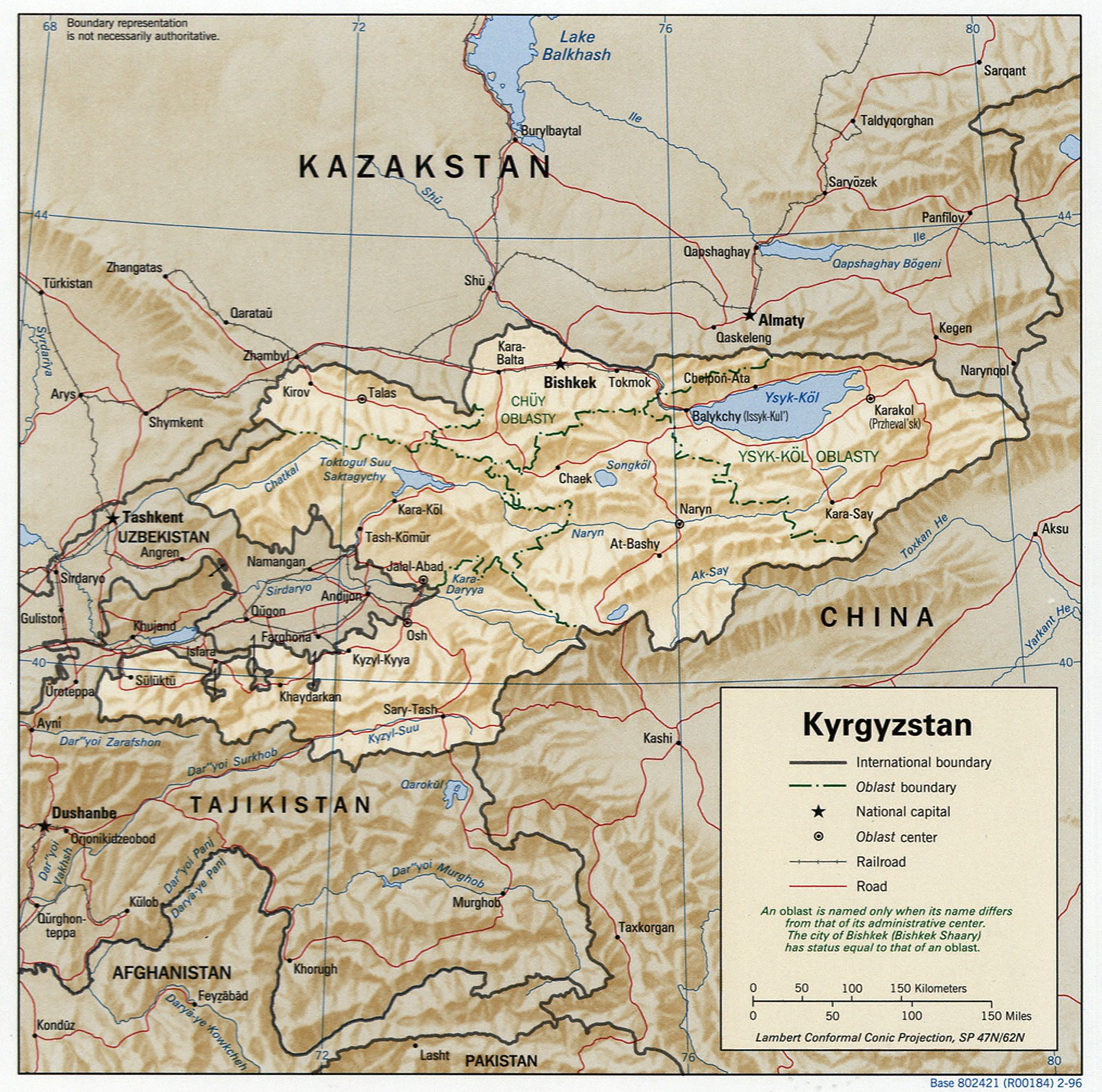
A topographic map of Kyrgyzstan

The Ahmadiyya Muslim Community first entered Kyrgyzstan in the early 1990s through the efforts of a number of missionaries sent from Pakistan. The Community was first registered in the country, about a decade later, in 2002. However, the registration excluded regions outside Bishkek. Moreover, in Bishkek, Ahmadis were only able to register as a "foreign mission", despite most members being of Kyrgyz ethnic origin. In regions outside the capital, the Community had been unable to register. As a consequence of its registration as a foreign mission, Ahmadi Muslims have been prevented from undertaking any religious activity without formal authorization from the state. According to a local Ahmadi representative, this made it difficult to register in regions outside the capital. In 2007, Ahmadi Muslims were directed not to meet in public for worship in those regions without official registration.

In 2008 Ahmadi Muslims translated the Quran in Kyrgyz, publishing over 3,000 copies of the religious scripture. However, its translation was rejected by official members of the Kyrgyz clergy.

In view of the country's security service's claim that the Ahmadis represent a "dangerous movement" which is "against traditional Islam", the State Commission on Religious Affairs refused to re-register the Community in 2011. This restriction included Bishkek and as well as other regions with Ahmadiyya presence, namely Osh, Issyk-Kul and Chüy. Officials within the commission stated that the Ahmadiyya movement poses a "threat to religious security" and that it "does not comply with Sharia Law". Since then, the country's main Ahmadiyya mosque in the capital, Bishkek, has remained closed.

In 2013, two lower courts passed decisions in favor of the view taken up by the State Commission on Religious Affairs. As a consequence, Salamat Kyshtobayev, a leading member of the Ahmadiyya Muslim Community submitted an appeal to the Supreme Court which was later rejected in July 2014. The hearing, which was chaired by Judge Aynash Tokbayeva, consisted of members of the Commission, and as well as representatives of the National Security Committee secret police. According to an unnamed human rights activist, the "authorities turn a blind eye to hate speeches on TV and other media, and in mosques about Ahmadi Muslims and other vulnerable religious groups".

On December 22, 2015, an Ahmadi Muslim Yunusjan Abdujalilov was killed in front of his village home of Kashgar-Kyshtak, Osh Region. Three days later, on December 25, the local police arrested nine suspects who claimed that they were told to launch an attack on Ahmadis by a terrorist group linked to Islamic State in Iraq and the Levant. One suspect confessed to the attempted murder of another Ahmadi Muslim, Ulugbek Turdakhunov, based in the same village, back in September of the same year. According to one independent human rights activist there is an indirect link between the religious restrictions placed on Ahmadis and the murder itself.

== See also ==
- Islam in Kyrgyzstan
