= Kyrgyzstan–Turkey relations =

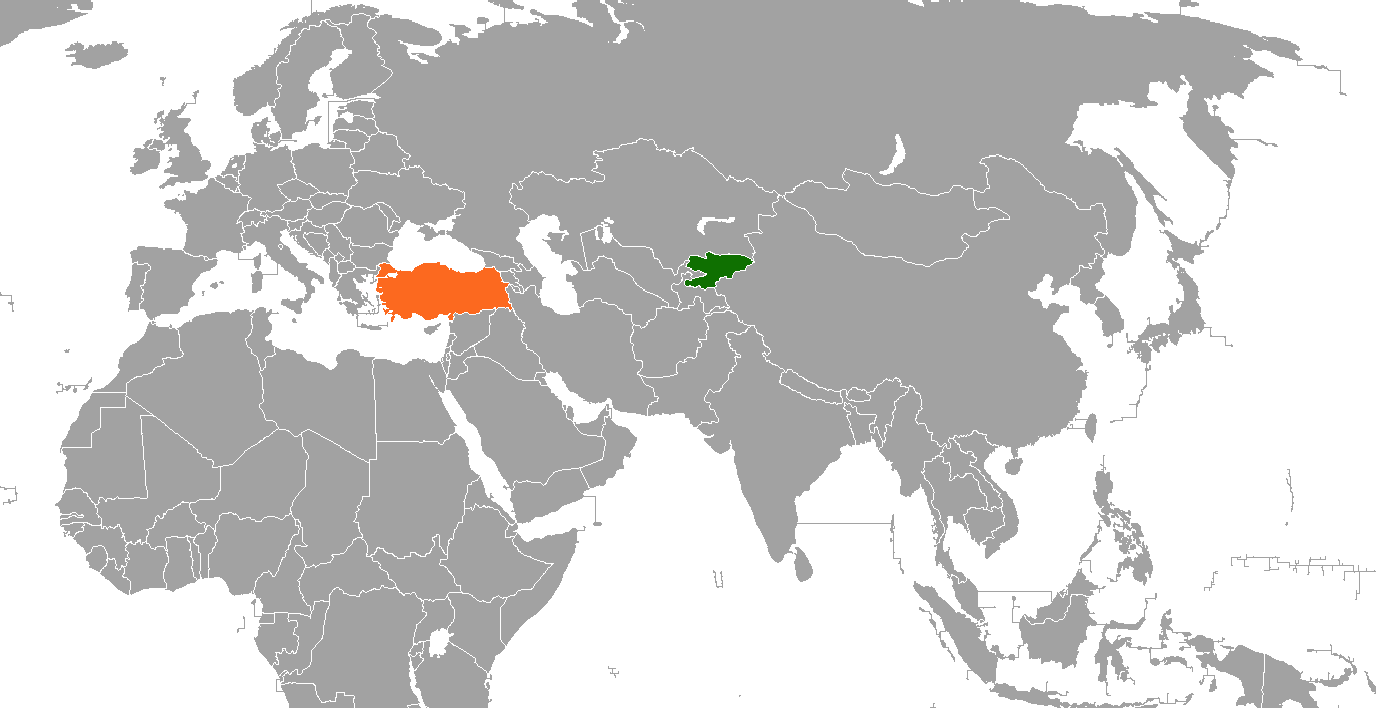

- Kyrgyzstan: Turkey

Diplomatic mission
- Kyrgyz embassy, Ankara: Turkish embassy, Bishkek

Kyrgyzstan–Turkey relations are the foreign relations between Kyrgyzstan and Turkey. Kyrgyzstan has an embassy in Ankara and a consulate-general in Istanbul. Turkey has an embassy in Bishkek.

== Diplomatic relations ==
Pan-Turkic solidarity has prompted Turkey to expand ties with Kyrgyzstan. Subsequently, Turkey concluded numerous cultural, economic, and technical aid agreements with Kyrgyzstan and sponsored its full membership in the ECO, a regional trade pact whose original members were Iran, Pakistan, and Turkey.

Turkey lacked adequate economic resources to alleviate Kyrgyzstan's economic decline, which was the worst in CIS. After the failure of many joint ventures in Kyrgyzstan, Turkey concluded that Kyrgyzstan is too small and too poor to be economically viable without Russian assistance and reoriented its policies to narrowly define its support as supplier of technical assistance and investments.

Following the dissolution of the Soviet Union, Turkish foreign policy perceived an opportunity to obtain alignments with the various Turkic-speaking states in Central Asia. Turkey quickly arranged diplomatic exchanges with the heads of government of newly independent Kyrgyzstan, becoming the first country to recognize Kyrgyzstan on December 16, 1991. Diplomatic relations between two countries were established on 29 January 1992. The Embassies were reciprocally opened in Bishkek and Ankara in 1992.

This pan-Turkic foreign policy thrust Turkey into competition with Russia. Kyrgyzstan ultimately aligned more closely with Russia. It provided a more sustainable source of economic assistance than Ankara; the militaries of these nations had been trained by and felt close to the former Soviet military; and the region's infrastructure was tied to Russia.

By 2019, more than 100 bilateral agreements and protocols were concluded between the two countries to lay the legal ground of relations and numerous mutual high level visits were place.

== Presidential visits ==
Guest	Host	Place of visit	Date of visit
(Kyrgyzstan) President Sooronbay Jeenbekov	(Turkey) President Recep Tayyip Erdoğan	Presidential Complex, Ankara	April 9–11, 2018
(Kyrgyzstan) President Sooronbay Jeenbekov	(Turkey) President Recep Tayyip Erdoğan	Presidential Complex, Ankara	July 9, 2018
(Kyrgyzstan) President Sadyr Japarov	(Turkey) President Recep Tayyip Erdoğan	Presidential Complex, Ankara	June 9, 2021

== Economic relations ==
- Trade volume between the two countries was US$519 million in 2019 (Turkish exports/imports: US$442/77 million).

== See also ==
- Foreign relations of Kyrgyzstan
- Foreign relations of Turkey
- Turks in Kyrgyzstan
- Battle of Sayan Mountains
- Battle of Bolchu
