= Islam in Kyrgyzstan =

The vast majority of people in Kyrgyzstan are Muslims; as of 2019, 90.7% of the country's population were followers of Islam. Muslims in Kyrgyzstan are generally of the Non denominational and Sunni branch, mostly of the Hanafi school, which entered the region during the eighth century. Kyrgyzstan is home to more than 2000 mosques. Most Kyrgyz Muslims practice their religion in a specific way influenced by shamanic tribal customs. There has been a revival of Islamic practices since independence in Kyrgyzstan. For the most part religious leaders deal only with issues of religion and do not reach out to communities, but rather offer services to those who come to the mosque. There are regional differences, with the southern part of the country being more religious. Kyrgyzstan remained a secular state after the fall of communism, which had only superficial influence on religious practice when Kyrgyzstan was a Soviet republic, despite the policy of state atheism. Most of the Russian population of Kyrgyzstan is Russian Orthodox. The Uzbeks, who make up 14.9 percent of the population, are generally Sunni Muslims.

== The introduction of Islam ==
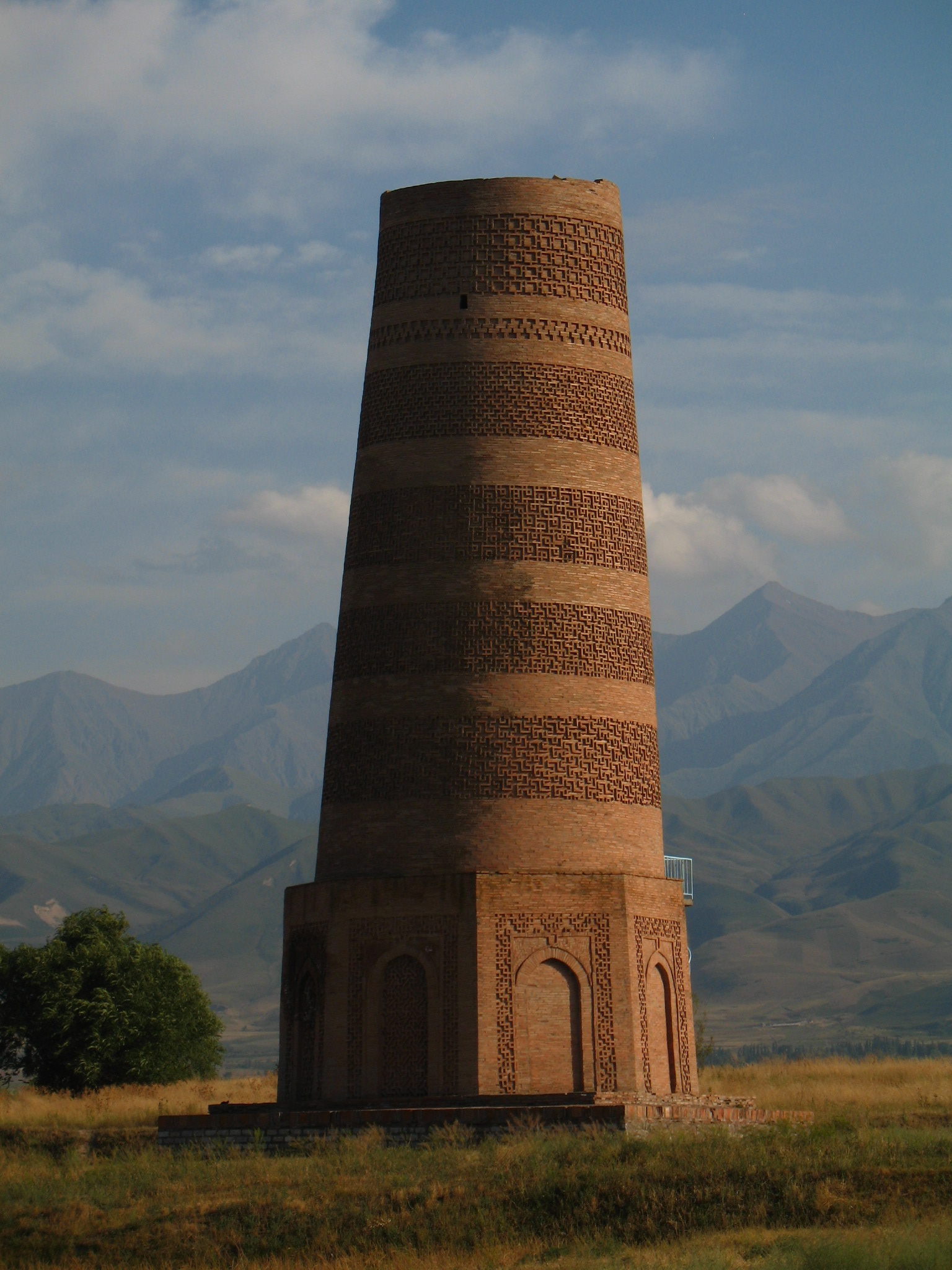
Remains of the eleventh-century Burana minaret in the ruined town of Balasagun, capital of the Islamic Kara-Khanid Khanate (934–1212)

Islam was introduced to the Kyrgyz tribes between the seventh and twelfth centuries by the Umayyad caliphate. More recent exposure to Islam occurred in the seventeenth century, when the Jungars drove the Kyrgyz of the Tian Shan region into the Fergana Valley, whose population was totally Islamic due to previous Umayyad influence. However, as the danger from the Jungars subsided, a few elements of the Kyrgyz population returned to some of their tribal customs. When the Quqon Khanate advanced into northern Kyrgyzstan in the eighteenth century, various northern Kyrgyz tribes remained aloof from the official Islamic practices of that regime. By the end of the nineteenth century, however, the entire Kyrgyz population, including the tribes in the north, had converted to Sunni Islam. Each of the Muslim ethnic groups has a deep and long tradition of customary law. The ethnic Kyrgyz have also preserved pre-Islamic traditions and customs which are not contrary to the Islamic teachings, which is similar to what happened in Indonesia.

== Tribal influence ==
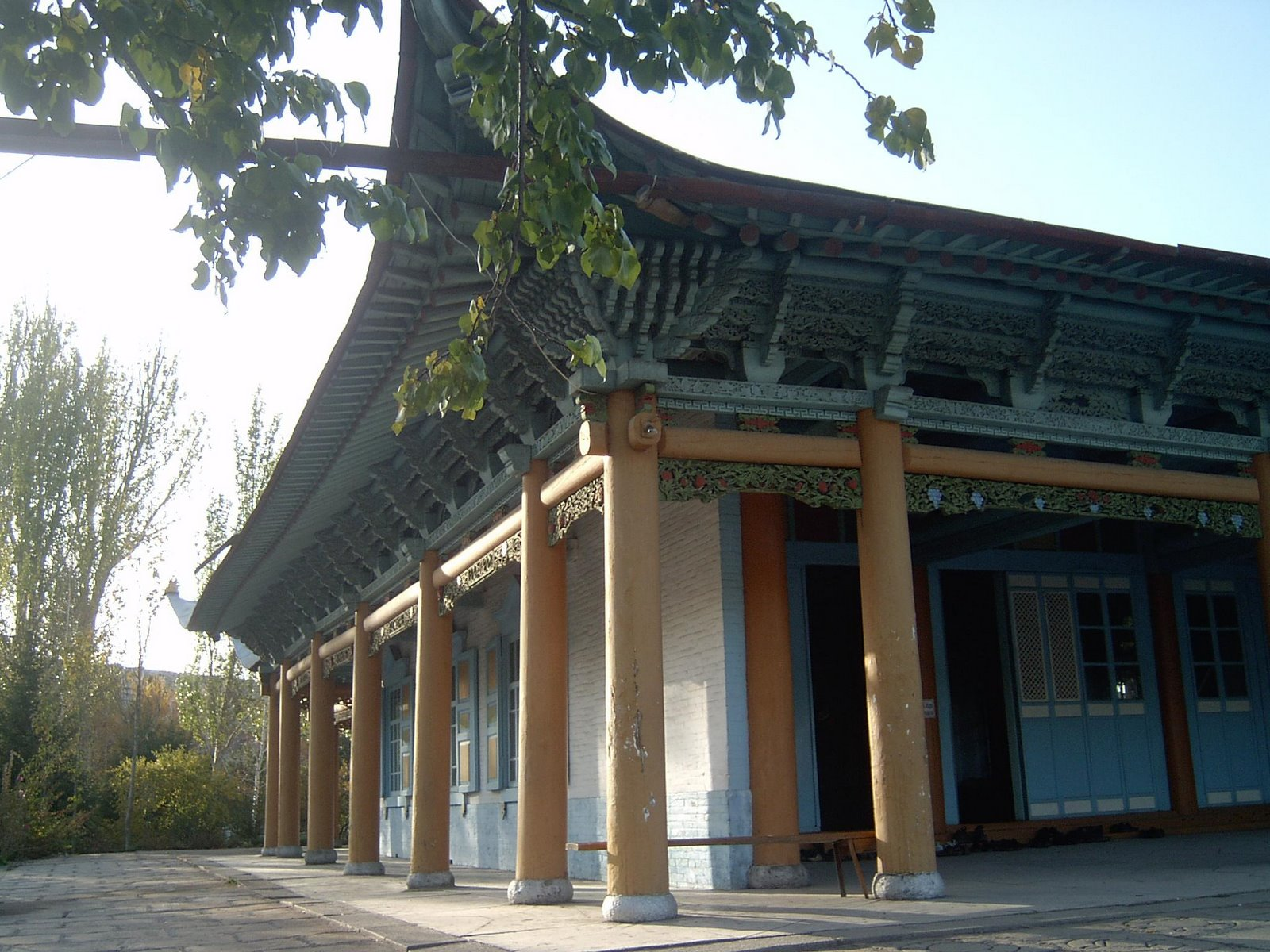
Karakol Dungan Mosque

Before Islam, the religion of the Kyrgyz people was Tengrism, the recognition of spiritual kinship with a particular type of animal and reverence for the Spirits of nature, ancestors, the earth and sky. Under this belief system, which predates their contact with Islam, Kyrgyz tribes traditionally adopted reindeer, camels, snakes, owls, and bears as objects of worship. The sky, earth, sun, moon, and stars also play an important religious role. The strong dependence of the nomads on the forces of nature reinforced such connections and fostered belief in shamanism. Traces of such beliefs remain in the religious practice of many of today's Kyrgyz residing in the north. Kyrgyz sociologist Rakhat Achylova discussed how aspects of Tengrism were adopted into Kyrgyz Islam.

Knowledge of and interest in Islam is much stronger in the south than further north. Religious practice in the north is more mixed with animism and shamanist practices, giving worship there a resemblance to Siberian religious practice.

== Islam and the state ==
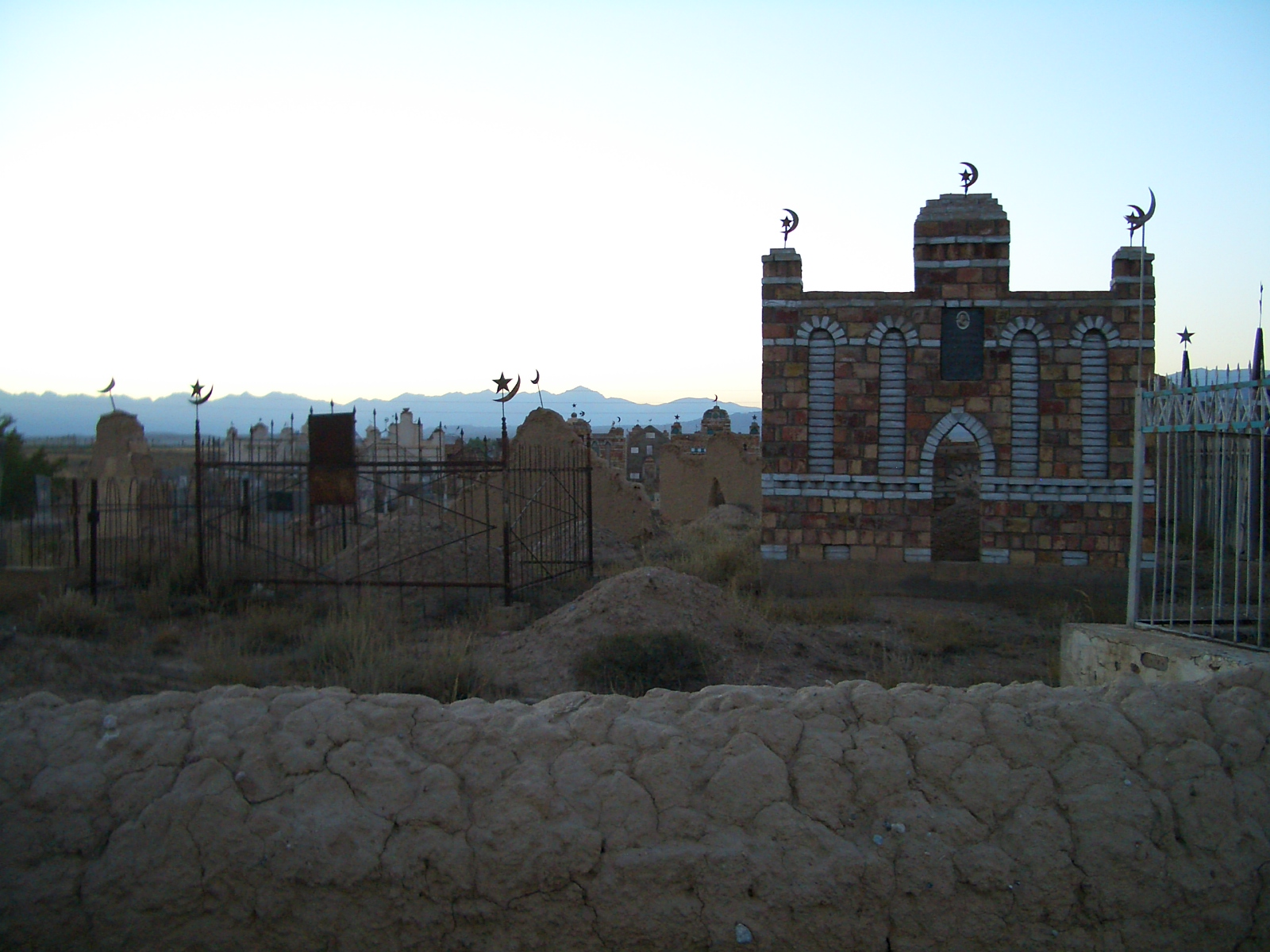
Muslim cemetery in Kosh-Köl, Issyk-Kul Region

While religion has not played a particularly significant role in the politics of Kyrgyzstan, more traditional elements of Islamic values have been urged despite the nation's constitution stipulating to secularism. Although the constitution forbids the intrusion of any ideology or religion in the conduct of state business, a growing number of public figures have expressed support for the promotion of Islamic traditions. As in other parts of Central Asia, non-Central Asians have been concerned about the potential of a fundamentalist Islamic revolution that would emulate Iran and Afghanistan by bringing Islam directly into the shaping of state policy, to the detriment of the non-Islamic population.

Because of sensitivity about the economic consequences of a continued outflow of Russians (brain drain), then president Askar Akayev took particular pains to reassure the non-Kyrgyz that no Islamic revolution would occur. Akayev paid public visits to Bishkek's main Russian Orthodox church and directed one million rubles from the state treasury toward that faith's church-building fund. He also appropriated funds and other support for a German cultural center. Nevertheless, there has been support from local government to build bigger mosques and religious schools. Additionally, recent bills have been proposed to outlaw abortion, and numerous attempts have been made to decriminalize polygamy and to allow officials to travel to Mecca on a hajj under a tax-free agreement. In August 2016, the former President of Kyrgyzstan, Almazbek Atambayev, claimed that "women can become radicalised to become terrorists if they put on Islamic dress.” His remarks followed several weeks of controversy over government-sponsored hoardings or banners put up in the streets of the capital Bishkek to try to dissuade Kyrgyz women from wearing Islamic clothing, notably the hijab, niqab and burka.

== Current status ==
The state recognizes two Muslim feast days as official holidays: Eid ul-Fitr (Öröz Ayt), which ends Ramadan, and Eid ul-Adha (Kurban Ayt), which commemorates Ibrahim's willingness to sacrifice his son. The country also recognizes Orthodox Christmas as well as the traditional Persian festival of Nowruz. As of 2015, there have been more than 2000 mosques in Kyrgyzstan.

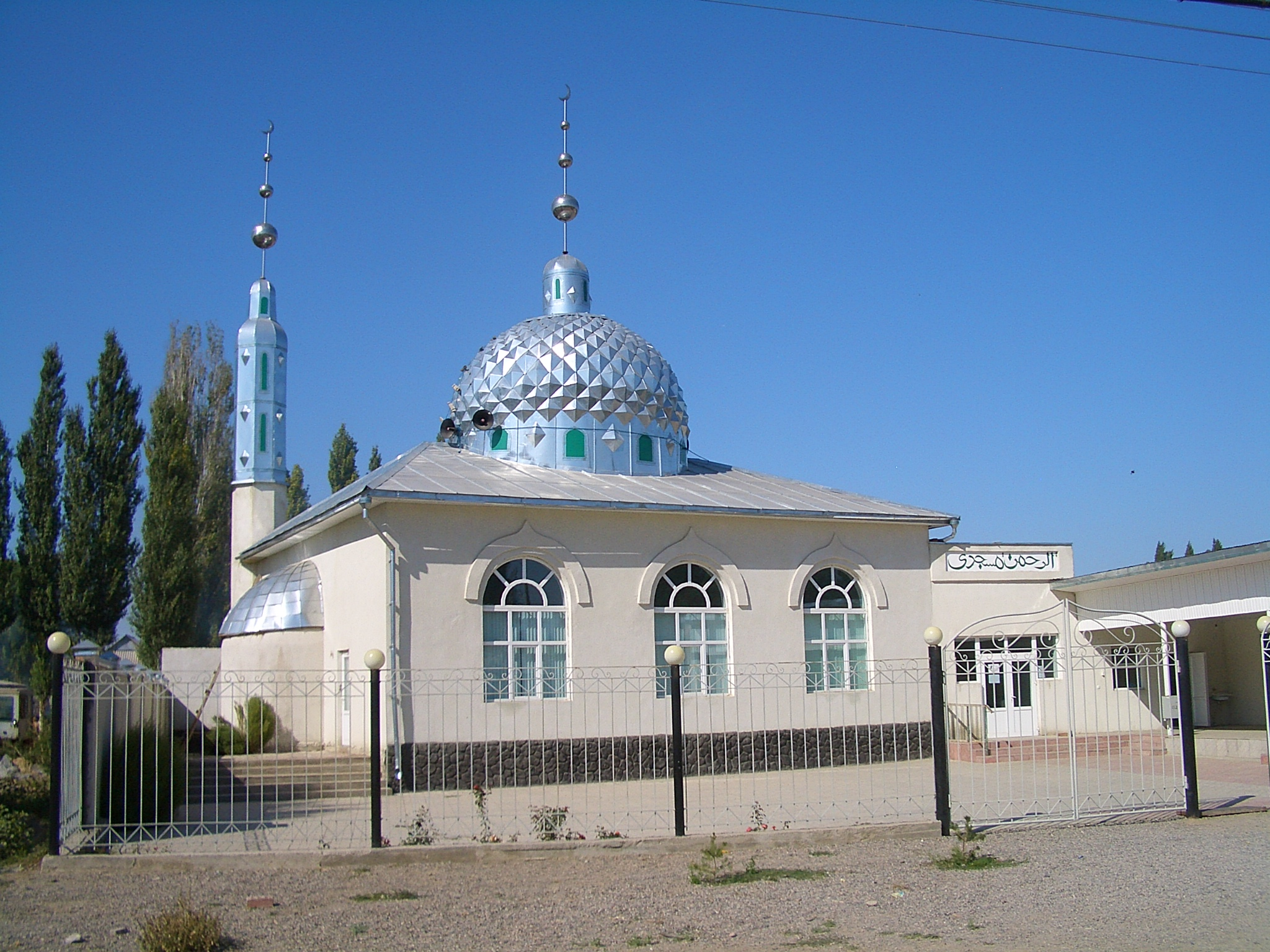
A new village mosque in Milyanfan, Chüy Region

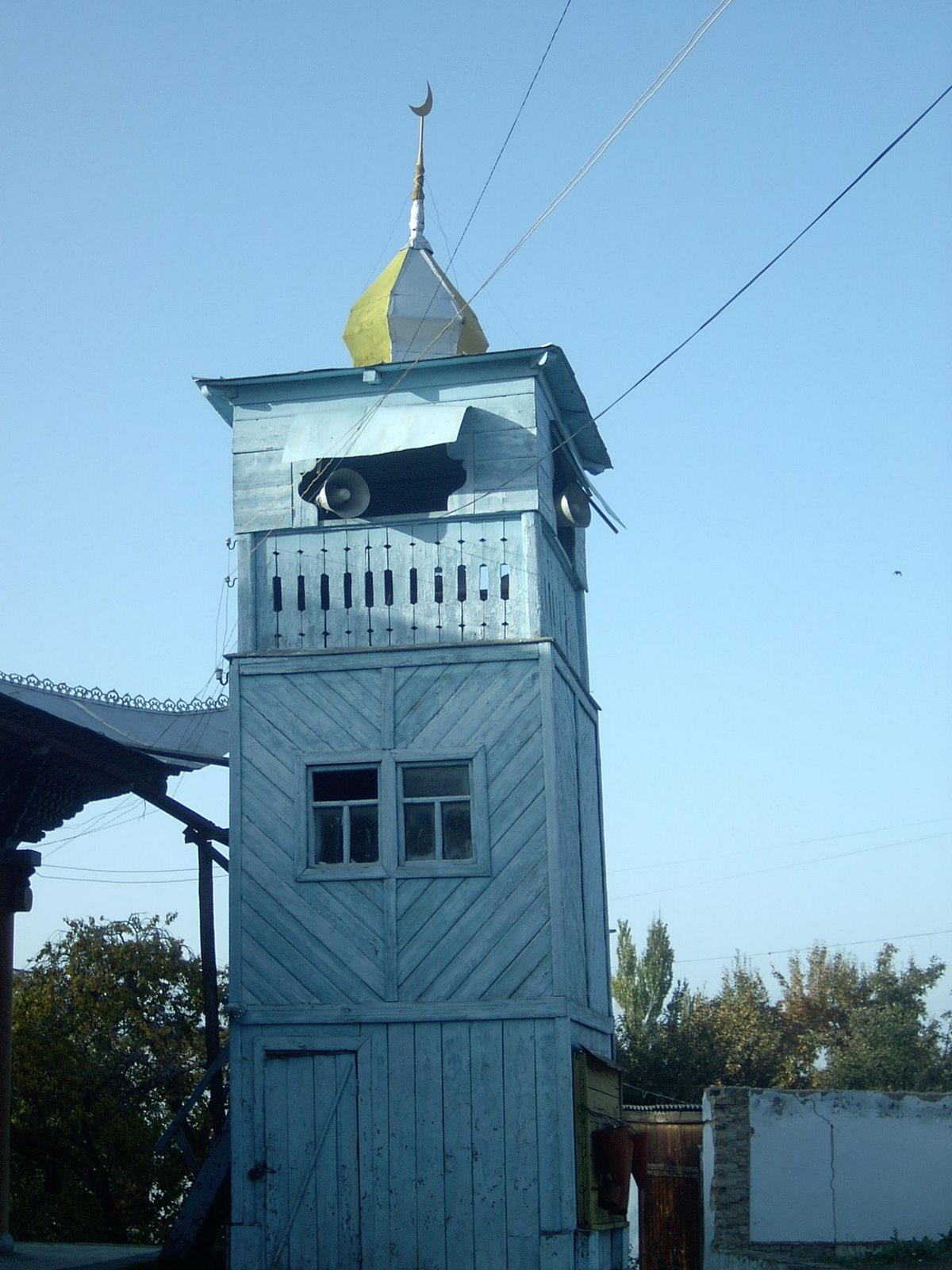
A minaret of the Dungan mosque in Karakol. A small minority in Kyrgyzstan, Dungans are also Muslims

Mosque in Kyrgyzstan

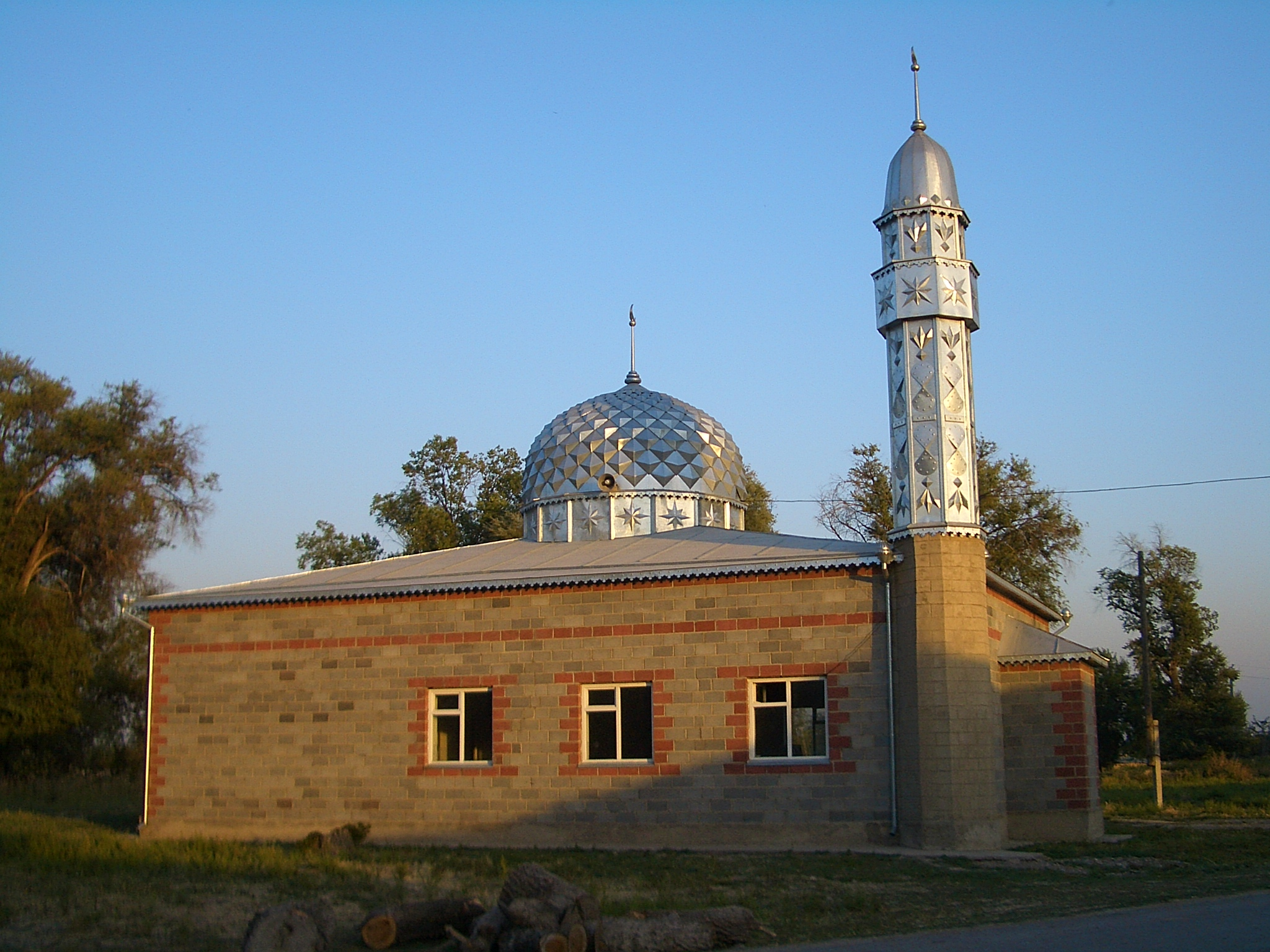
A new Mosque in Ysyk-Ata District

== See also ==
- Religion in Kyrgyzstan
- Ahmadiyya in Kyrgyzstan
- List of countries by Muslim population
- List of mosques in Kyrgyzstan
