= Turks in Kyrgyzstan =

Ethnic Turks of Kyrgyzstan

Total population
- 50,000 to 70,000; plus 3,200 Turkish nationals

Regions with significant populations
- Bishkek; Chüy R; Osh; Osh R; Talas R

Languages
- Turkish, Kyrgyz

Religion
- Islam

Turks in Kyrgyzstan (Turkish: Kırgızistan'daki Türkler) are ethnic Turks who live in Kyrgyzstan.

== History ==
The majority of Turks were deported from south-western Georgia to Central Asia in 1944, where they were employed largely in the agricultural sector in grain and livestock production. Of the 207,500 Meskhetian Turks registered in the 1989 Soviet census, there were 21,294 Turks in Kyrgyzstan.

Turks in Kyrgyzstan according to Soviet Censuses and 1999, 2009 National Censuses
Year	Population
1970	3,076
1979	5,160
1989	21,294
1999	33,327
2009	39,133

== Demographics ==
Turks in Kyrgyzstan are often called Fergana Turks due to their large presence in the Fergana valley.

== Education ==
The Kyrgyz-Turkish Manas University was established in Jal district of Bishkek in 1995 and has around 2,000 students. It is one of the leading universities in the country. The Kyrgyz-Turkish Anatolian High School, Kyrgyz-Turkish Anatolian Girls Vocational School, Bishkek Turkish Primary School and Turkish Language Teaching Center are run by the Turkish Ministry of Education.

== Notable people ==
- Ömürbek Babanov, Prime Minister of Kyrgyzstan in 2011-12 (Turkish Meskhetian mother)
- Orhan İnandı, founder of the Sapat system of schools in Kyrgyzstan, including Ala-Too International University

== See also ==
- Kyrgyzstan–Turkey relations
- Turks in the former Soviet Union
- Turkic Council

== Bibliography ==
- Babak, Vladimir; Vaisman, Demian; Wasserman, Aryeh (2004), Political Organization in Central Asia and Azerbaijan: Sources and Documents, Routledge, ISBN 0-7146-4838-8.
- Blacklock, Denika (2005), FINDING DURABLE SOLUTIONS FOR THE MESKHETIANS (PDF), EUROPEAN CENTRE FOR MINORITY ISSUES, archived from the original (PDF) on 2010-06-02
- Council of Europe (2007), Parliamentary Assembly: Working Papers 2007 Ordinary Session 22–26 January 2007, Council of Europe, ISBN 978-92-871-6191-8.
- Minahan, James (1998), Miniature Empires: A Historical Dictionary of the Newly Independent States, Greenwood Publishing Group, ISBN 0-313-30610-9.
