= Buddhism in Kyrgyzstan =

Buddhism in Kyrgyzstan is a minority religion in the country. However, the history of Buddhism in the region dates back many centuries.

Out of the 3,257 religious organizations registered with the Kyrgyzstani government, only one is Buddhist. It is based out of a renovated summer house, known as the "place of path," in a suburb about 30 miles south of Bishkek. Its community, known as "Chamsen," or "Liberation" in Korean, was founded in 1996 by ethnic Koreans in the village of Gornaya Maevka. The community does not restrict its followers to any one branch of Buddhism, and as such, both the Nipponzan Myohoji and Karma Kagyu branches are currently practiced. Its members are mostly Russian, Korean, and Kyrgyz.

== History ==
Buddhism first reached Central Asia via the Great Silk Road. Archaeologists have found traces of the religion's influence along this ancient trade route, including clay statues of Buddha and stones with Buddhist inscriptions. The most famous Buddhist sites in Kyrgyzstan are the mounds in Krasnaya Rechka and Novopokrovka, where large statues of the Buddha have been found.

Sogdians first spread Buddhism into northern Kyrgyzstan, in what is now the Chüy Region by the 7th century. The Western Turkic Khaganate patronized Buddhism and built some monasteries around the region. The Turgesh tribe in particular helped to establish the presence of Buddhism in what is now modern Kyrgyzstan in the late 7th to early 8th centuries. Eastern portions of the area were conquered by the Tibetan Empire in the 8th century, who introduced Tibetan Buddhism. The rise of the Karluks, who were friendly towards Buddhism further cemented the religion in the region. The Qarahanids, a subgroup of the Karluks, controlled eastern Kyrgyzstan and the Kashgar region of modern Xinjiang, China. The early Qarakhanids practiced a syncretic form of Buddhism and shamanism before their conversion to Islam in the late 10th century. Later occasions of Buddhism in the area include the Dzungars that conquered parts of the region. The Dzungars were Tibetan Buddhists who established tent monasteries throughout the region in the 17th and 18th centuries until the Dzungars were destroyed by the Qing dynasty. However, Buddhist influences still exist in some local religious practices, especially in several Sufi beliefs and rituals.

== See also ==
- Religion in Kyrgyzstan
- Buddhism in Kazakhstan
