= Union of Evangelical Christian Baptists of Kyrgyzstan =

The Union of Evangelical Christian Baptists of Kyrgyzstan (Russian: Союз евангельских христиан-баптистов Кыргызстана) is a Baptist Christian denomination in Kyrgyzstan. The headquarters is in Bishkek.

== History ==
The Convention has its origins in the establishment of the first Baptist Church in Bishkek by Ukrainians in 1907. It was officially founded in 1992. According to a census published by the association in 2010, it claimed 50 churches and 2,800 members.
