= Geography of Kyrgyzstan =

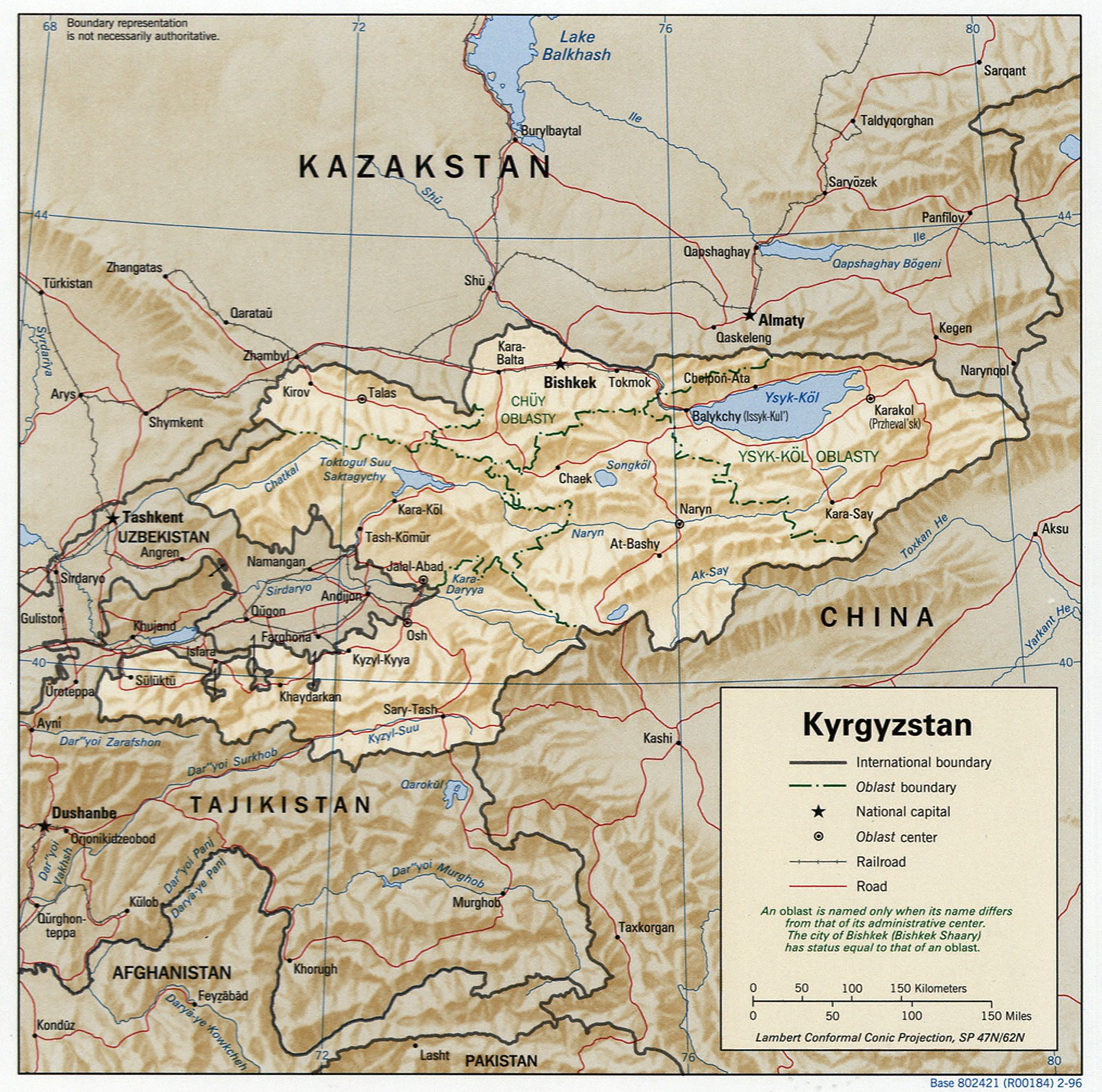
- Continent: Asia
- Region: Central Asia
- Area
  - Total: 200,105 km^{2} (77,261 sq mi)
- Coastline: 0 km (0 mi)
- Highest point: Jengish Chokusu; 7,439 m (24,406 ft)
- Lowest point: Kara Darya; 132 m (433 ft)
- Longest river: Naryn
- Largest lake: Issyk-Kul
- Climate: Continental climate Tundra climate

Map of Kyrgyzstan

Kyrgyzstan is a landlocked nation in Central Asia, with an area of 199,951 km^{2} (77,202 mi^{2}). The national territory extends about 900 km (560 mi) from east to west and 410 km (250 mi) from north to south.

Kyrgyzstan is bordered on the east and southeast by China, on the north by Kazakhstan, on the west by Uzbekistan, and on the south by Tajikistan. The borders with Uzbekistan and Tajikistan in the Fergana Valley are rather complicated. One consequence of the Stalinist division of Central Asia into five republics is that many ethnic Kyrgyz people do not live in Kyrgyzstan. Three enclaves, legally part of the territory of Kyrgyzstan but geographically removed by several kilometers, have been established, two in Uzbekistan and one in Tajikistan.

The terrain of Kyrgyzstan is dominated by the Tian Shan and Pamir mountain ranges, which together occupy about 65% of national territory. The Alay range portion of the Tian Shan system dominates the southwestern crescent of the country, and, to the east, the main Tian Shan range runs along the boundary between southern Kyrgyzstan and China before extending farther east into China's Xinjiang Uygur Autonomous Region. Kyrgyzstan's average elevation is 2,750 m (9,020 ft), ranging from 7,439 m (24,406 ft) at Peak Jengish Chokusu to 394 m (1,293 ft) in the Fergana Valley near Osh. Almost 90% of the country lies more than 1,500 m (4,900 ft) above sea level.

== Topography and drainage ==
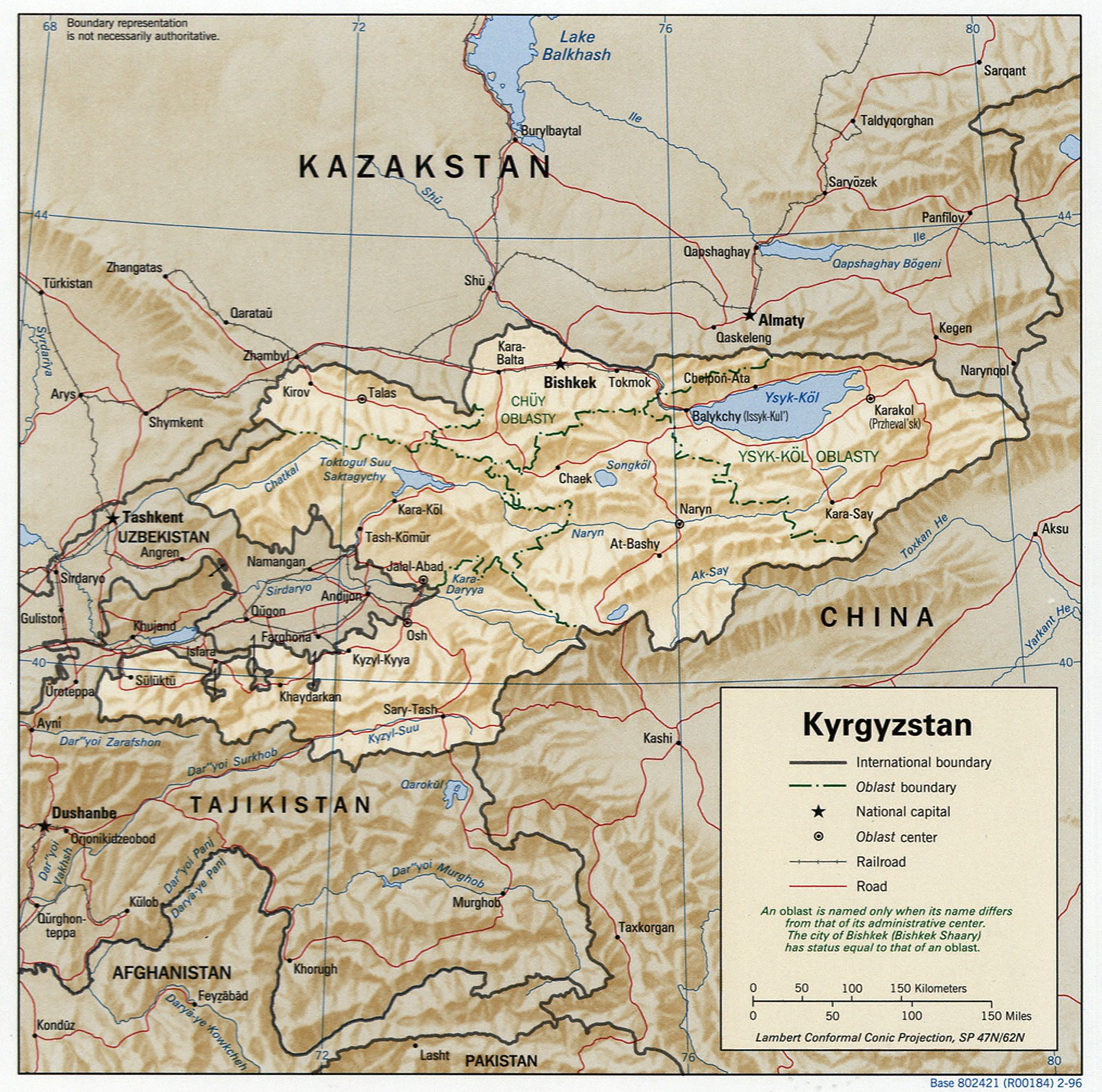
Detailed map of Kyrgyzstan

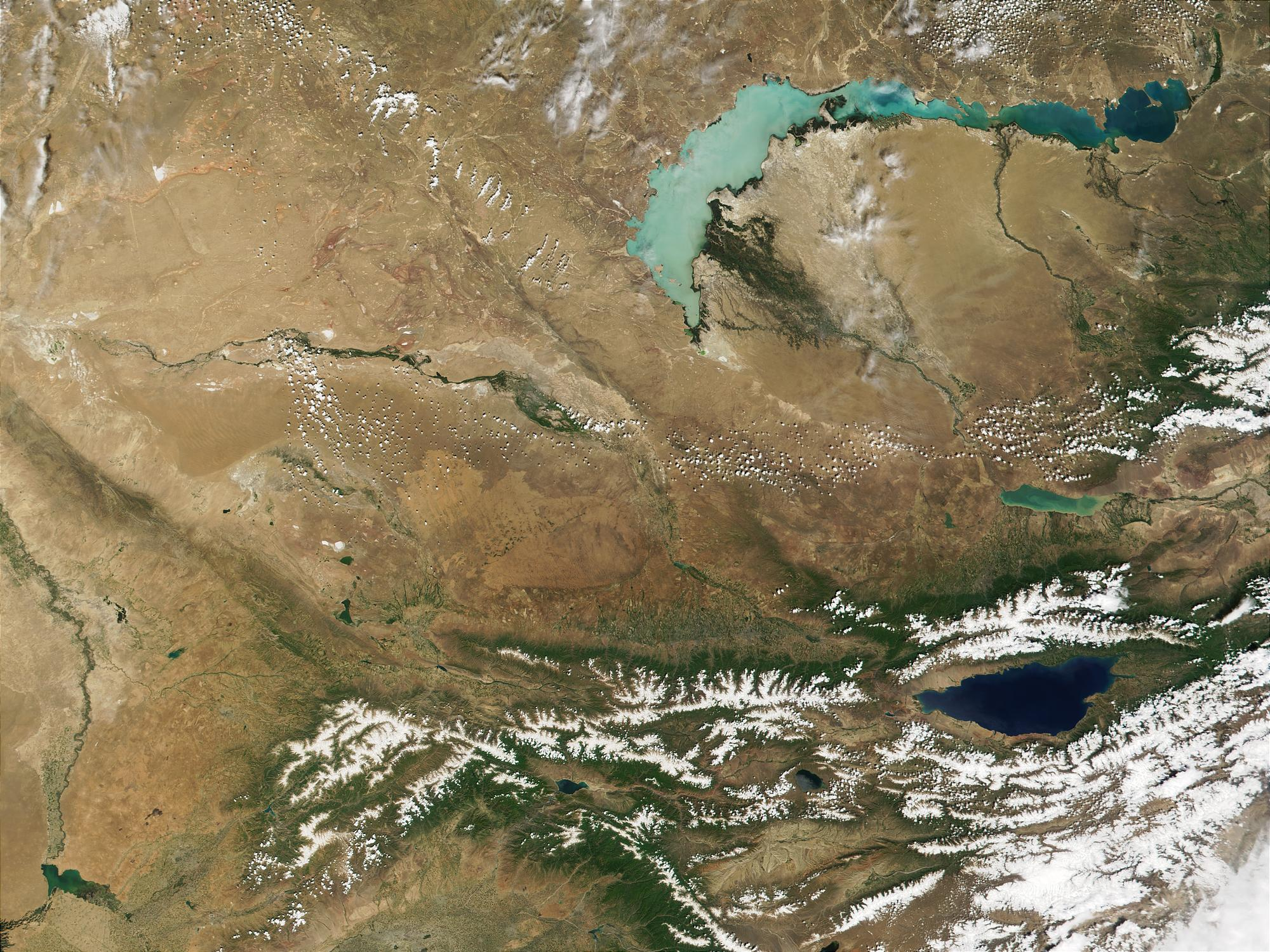
This MODIS true-color image shows portions of Kazakhstan (top) and Kyrgyzstan at the bottom. The lake at the top of the image is Lake Balkash.

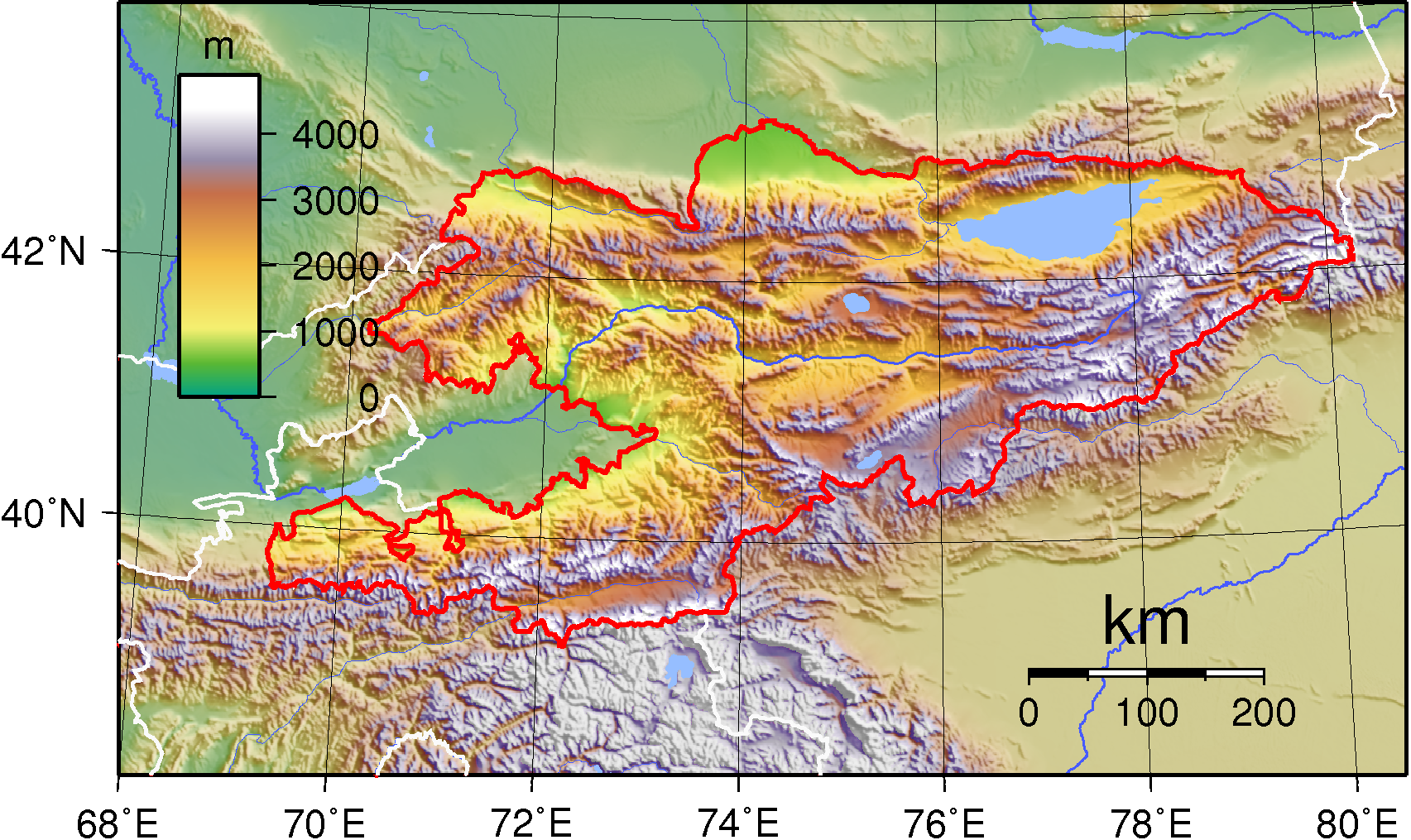
Topography

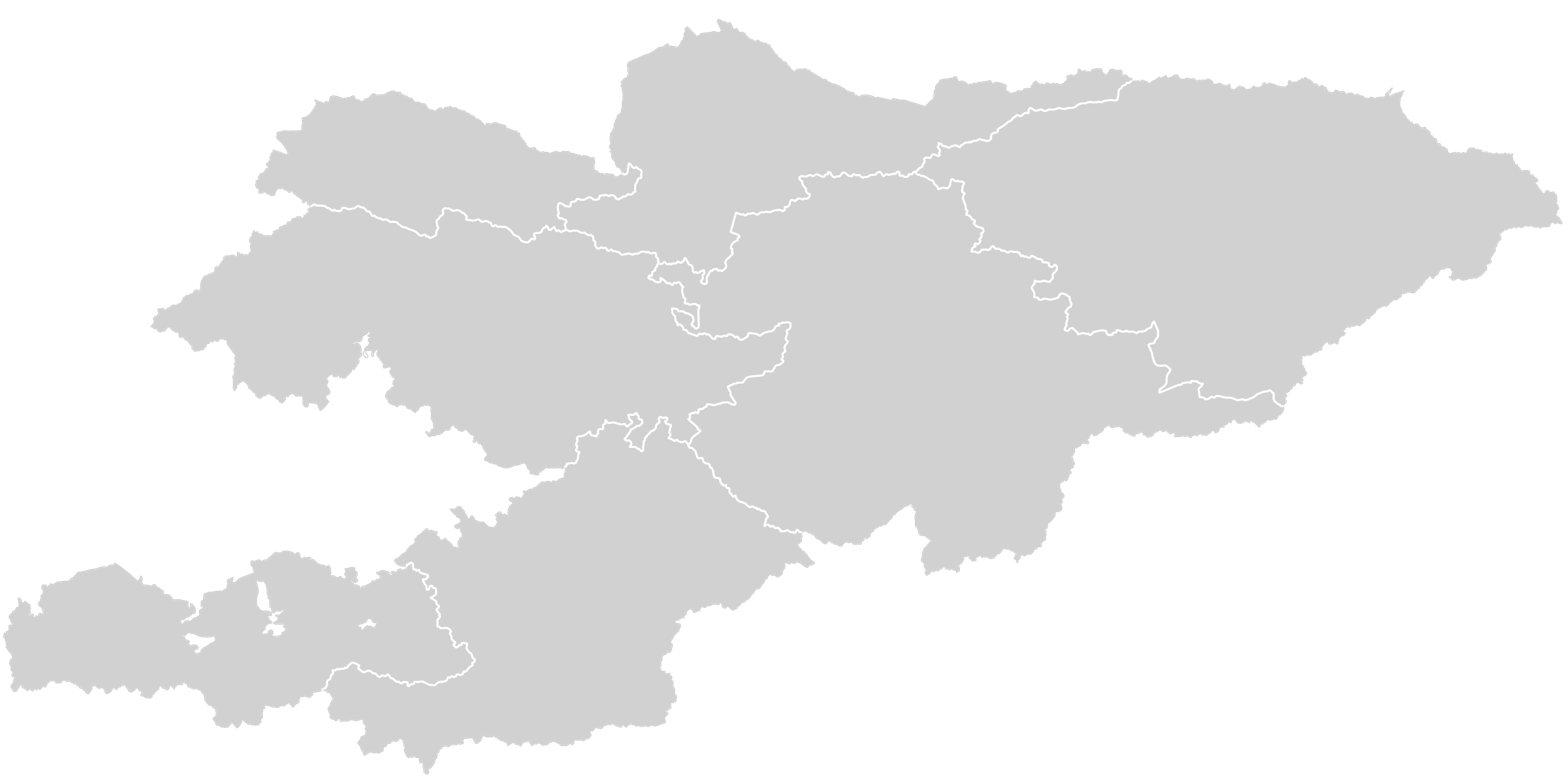
Blank map

The mountains of Kyrgyzstan are geologically young, so that the physical terrain is marked by sharply uplifted peaks separated by deep valleys. There is also considerable glaciation, with the largest glacier being the Engilchek Glacier. Kyrgyzstan's 6,500 distinct glaciers are estimated to hold about 650 cubic kilometres (160 cu mi) of water and cover 8,048 square kilometers (5,000 square miles) or 4.2% of Kyrgyzstan. Only around the Chüy, Talas, and Fergana valleys is there relatively flat land suitable for large-scale agriculture.

Because the high peaks function as moisture catchers, Kyrgyzstan is relatively well watered by the streams that descend from them. None of the rivers of Kyrgyzstan are navigable, however. The majority are small, rapid, runoff streams. Most of Kyrgyzstan's rivers are tributaries of the Syr Darya, which has its headwaters in the western Tian Shan along the Chinese border. Another large runoff system forms the Chu (Chüy), which arises in northern Kyrgyzstan, then flows northwest and disappears into the deserts of southern Kazakhstan. Ysyk-Köl is the second largest body of water in Central Asia, after the Aral Sea, but the saline lake has been shrinking steadily, and its mineral content has been rising gradually. Kyrgyzstan has a total of about 2,000 lakes with a total surface area of 7,000 square kilometres (2,700 sq mi), mostly located at altitudes of 3,000 to 4,000 m (10,000 to 13,000 ft). Only the largest three, however, occupy more than 500 square kilometres (190 sq mi) each. The second- and third-largest lakes, Song-Köl and Chatyr-Köl (the latter of which also is saline), are located in the Naryn River Basin.

Natural disasters have been frequent and varied. Overgrazing and deforestation of steep mountain slopes have increased the occurrence of mudslides and avalanches, which occasionally have swallowed entire villages. In August 1992, a severe earthquake left several thousand people homeless in the southwestern city of Jalal-Abad.

== Climate ==
Kyrgyzstan map of Köppen climate classification

The country's climate is influenced chiefly by the mountains, Kyrgyzstan's position near the middle of the Eurasian landmass, and the absence of any body of water large enough to influence weather patterns. Those factors create a distinctly continental climate that has significant local variations. Although the mountains tend to collect clouds and block sunlight (reducing some narrow valleys at certain times of year to no more than three or four hours of sunlight per day), the country is generally sunny, receiving as much as 2,900 hours of sunlight per year in some areas. The same conditions also affect temperatures, which can vary significantly from place to place. In January the warmest average temperature (−4 °C or 25 °F) occurs around the southern city of Osh, and around Ysyk-Köl. The latter, which has a volume of 1,738 cubic kilometers (417 cu mi), does not freeze in winter. Indeed, its name means "hot lake" in Kyrgyz. The coldest temperatures are in mountain valleys. There, readings can fall to −30 °C (−22 °F) or lower; the record is −53.6 °C (−64.5 °F). The average temperature for July similarly varies from 27 °C (80.6 °F) in the Fergana Valley, where the record high is 44 °C (111 °F), to a low of −10 °C (14 °F) on the highest mountain peaks. Precipitation varies from 2,000 mm (80 in) per year in the mountains above the Fergana Valley to less than 100 mm (4 in) per year on the west bank of Ysyk-Köl.

Climate data for Bishkek (1991–2020, extremes 1936–present)
Month	Jan	Feb	Mar	Apr	May	Jun	Jul	Aug	Sep	Oct	Nov	Dec	Year
Record high °C (°F)	20.0 (68.0)	25.4 (77.7)	30.5 (86.9)	34.7 (94.5)	36.7 (98.1)	40.9 (105.6)	42.1 (107.8)	39.7 (103.5)	37.1 (98.8)	34.2 (93.6)	29.8 (85.6)	23.7 (74.7)	42.1 (107.8)
Mean daily maximum °C (°F)	2.9 (37.2)	5.1 (41.2)	12.1 (53.8)	18.7 (65.7)	24.1 (75.4)	29.5 (85.1)	32.4 (90.3)	31.4 (88.5)	25.6 (78.1)	18.5 (65.3)	10.3 (50.5)	4.6 (40.3)	17.9 (64.2)
Daily mean °C (°F)	−2.7 (27.1)	−0.5 (31.1)	6.2 (43.2)	12.8 (55.0)	17.8 (64.0)	22.9 (73.2)	25.5 (77.9)	24.2 (75.6)	18.7 (65.7)	11.6 (52.9)	4.2 (39.6)	−1.1 (30.0)	11.6 (52.9)
Mean daily minimum °C (°F)	−7.1 (19.2)	−4.9 (23.2)	1.0 (33.8)	6.9 (44.4)	11.2 (52.2)	16.1 (61.0)	18.4 (65.1)	16.9 (62.4)	11.7 (53.1)	5.6 (42.1)	−0.5 (31.1)	−5.2 (22.6)	5.8 (42.4)
Record low °C (°F)	−31.9 (−25.4)	−34 (−29)	−21.8 (−7.2)	−12.3 (9.9)	−5.5 (22.1)	2.4 (36.3)	7.4 (45.3)	5.1 (41.2)	−2.8 (27.0)	−11.2 (11.8)	−32.2 (−26.0)	−29.1 (−20.4)	−34 (−29)
Average precipitation mm (inches)	28 (1.1)	37 (1.5)	51 (2.0)	75 (3.0)	60 (2.4)	34 (1.3)	19 (0.7)	15 (0.6)	19 (0.7)	37 (1.5)	44 (1.7)	37 (1.5)	456 (18.0)
Average extreme snow depth cm (inches)	5 (2.0)	3 (1.2)	1 (0.4)	0 (0)	0 (0)	0 (0)	0 (0)	0 (0)	0 (0)	0 (0)	1 (0.4)	3 (1.2)	5 (2.0)
Average rainy days	3	5	9	12	13	10	10	6	6	8	7	4	93
Average snowy days	9	9	5	2	0.3	0	0	0	0	1	4	7	37
Average relative humidity (%)	75	75	71	63	60	50	46	45	48	62	70	75	62
Mean monthly sunshine hours	137	128	153	194	261	306	332	317	264	196	144	114	2,546
Source 1: Pogoda.ru.net
Source 2: NOAA (sun, 1961–1990)

Climate data for Osh
Month	Jan	Feb	Mar	Apr	May	Jun	Jul	Aug	Sep	Oct	Nov	Dec	Year
Mean daily maximum °C (°F)	0.8 (33.4)	3.8 (38.8)	11.7 (53.1)	20.3 (68.5)	25.6 (78.1)	30.5 (86.9)	32.4 (90.3)	30.8 (87.4)	26.5 (79.7)	19.1 (66.4)	10.5 (50.9)	3.2 (37.8)	17.9 (64.3)
Daily mean °C (°F)	−3.8 (25.2)	−1.0 (30.2)	6.4 (43.5)	14.1 (57.4)	18.9 (66.0)	23.0 (73.4)	24.9 (76.8)	23.1 (73.6)	18.5 (65.3)	12.0 (53.6)	4.8 (40.6)	−1.0 (30.2)	11.7 (53.0)
Mean daily minimum °C (°F)	−8.3 (17.1)	−5.8 (21.6)	1.1 (34.0)	7.9 (46.2)	12.3 (54.1)	15.6 (60.1)	17.4 (63.3)	15.5 (59.9)	10.5 (50.9)	4.9 (40.8)	−0.8 (30.6)	−5.1 (22.8)	5.4 (41.8)
Average precipitation mm (inches)	35 (1.4)	44 (1.7)	55 (2.2)	52 (2.0)	47 (1.9)	18 (0.7)	12 (0.5)	6 (0.2)	8 (0.3)	38 (1.5)	32 (1.3)	32 (1.3)	379 (15)
Source: Climate-data.org

Climate data for Karakol
Month	Jan	Feb	Mar	Apr	May	Jun	Jul	Aug	Sep	Oct	Nov	Dec	Year
Mean daily maximum °C (°F)	−4.7 (23.5)	−2.9 (26.8)	4.8 (40.6)	14.0 (57.2)	18.9 (66.0)	23.1 (73.6)	25.5 (77.9)	25.0 (77.0)	20.2 (68.4)	12.7 (54.9)	3.4 (38.1)	−2.3 (27.9)	11.5 (52.7)
Daily mean °C (°F)	−10.4 (13.3)	−8.5 (16.7)	−0.5 (31.1)	7.8 (46.0)	12.8 (55.0)	16.7 (62.1)	19.0 (66.2)	18.2 (64.8)	13.4 (56.1)	6.4 (43.5)	−1.9 (28.6)	−7.6 (18.3)	5.5 (41.8)
Mean daily minimum °C (°F)	−16.1 (3.0)	−14.0 (6.8)	−5.8 (21.6)	1.7 (35.1)	6.8 (44.2)	10.4 (50.7)	12.5 (54.5)	11.4 (52.5)	6.7 (44.1)	0.1 (32.2)	−7.1 (19.2)	−12.9 (8.8)	−0.5 (31.1)
Average precipitation mm (inches)	12 (0.5)	14 (0.6)	23 (0.9)	39 (1.5)	55 (2.2)	54 (2.1)	57 (2.2)	55 (2.2)	39 (1.5)	31 (1.2)	20 (0.8)	14 (0.6)	413 (16.3)
Average relative humidity (%)	69.4	69.6	59.4	46.6	47.2	45.0	43.0	41.2	42.5	49.6	58.7	68.7	53.4
Source 1: Weatherbase (humidity)
Source 2: Climate-Data.org (temp & precip)

== Climate change ==
Reduction of glacier area in the Borkoldoy range (1965–2010)

Climate change is evident in Kyrgyzstan. Among the countries in Eastern Europe and Central Asia, Kyrgyzstan is the third most vulnerable to the effects of climate change, such as changes in weather patterns that could lead to prolonged periods of precipitation and drought. The average temperature has increased from 4.8 °C to 6 °C so far within the last 20 years. In 2013 the World Bank estimated a likely increase of 2 °C in average mean temperature by 2060 and of 4–5 °C by 2100, noting that the country's glaciers were significantly reduced and projected to decline further. A significant warming trend in Kyrgyzstan with a projected increase of 6°C under the Shared Socioeconomic Pathway (SSP) scenario SSP5-8.5 from 2076 to 2096. However the very slight increase in temperature is expected to positively affect climate-sensitive sectors such as agriculture, energy, and forestry as more land is within the optimum temperature band.

== Environmental issues ==
Kyrgyzstan has been spared many of the enormous environmental problems faced by its Central Asian neighbors, primarily because its designated roles in the Soviet system involved neither heavy industry nor large-scale cotton production. Also, the economic downturn of the early 1990s reduced some of the more serious effects of industrial and agricultural policy. Nevertheless, Kyrgyzstan has serious problems because of inefficient use and pollution of water resources, land degradation, and improper agricultural practices. The country is prone to earthquakes, and major flooding occurs during the snow melt.

=== Water resources ===
The Kyrgyz Republic is the only Central Asian state where water resources are fully generated within its own territory. The water originates from the often glacier covered mountain ranges and its abundance is a vital component for agriculture and the production of hydro‐electric power. The mountainous Kyrgyz Republic is an essential "water tower" for irrigated arable farming on arid plain territories. In addition, the impressive glacierized mountain landscape implies a considerable potential for tourism.

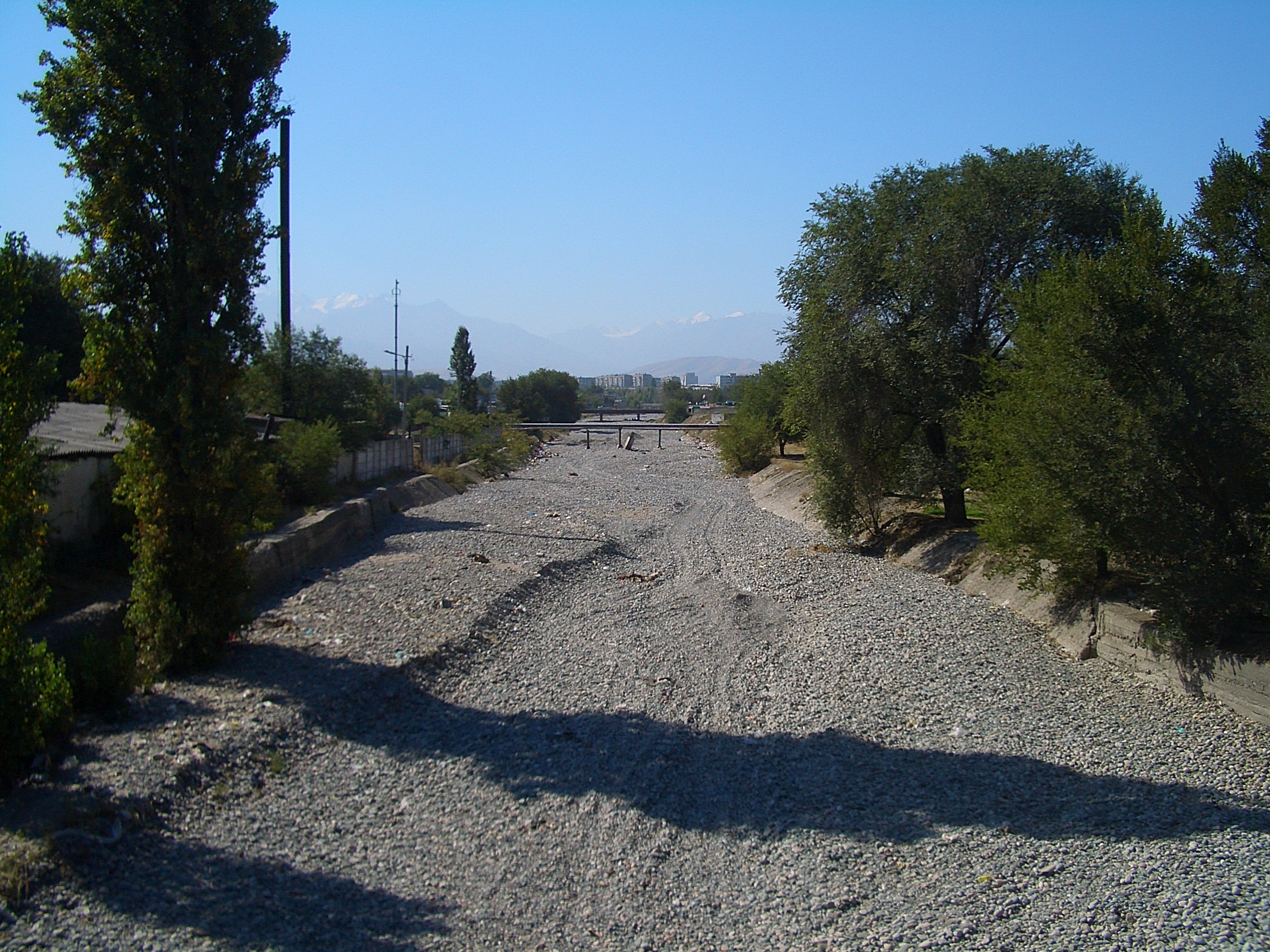
Alamedin River does not carry a lot of water in September

Although Kyrgyzstan has abundant water running through it, its water supply is determined by a post-Soviet sharing agreement among the five Central Asian republics. As in the Soviet era, Kyrgyzstan has the right to 25% of the water that originates in its territory, but the new agreement allows Turkmenistan and Uzbekistan unlimited use of the water that flows into them from Kyrgyzstan, with no compensation for the nation at the source. Kyrgyzstan uses the entire amount to which the agreement entitles it, but utilization is skewed heavily in favor of agricultural irrigation. During the Soviet era, Kyrgyzstan and Tajikistan shared their abundant water resources with Uzbekistan, Kazakhstan, and Turkmenistan during summer, and these three nations shared oil and gas with Kyrgyzstan and Tajikistan in winter. According to the International Crisis Group, the skewed system that is currently in place could cause irreversible regional destabilization, and needs to be dealt with by international actors to avoid a crisis in Central Asia. In 1994 agriculture accounted for about 88% of total water consumption, compared with 8% by industry and 4% by municipal water distribution systems. According to World Bank experts, Kyrgyzstan has an adequate supply of high-quality water for future use, provided the resource is prudently managed. However, in Central Asia water problems are on the rise. The Kyrgyz Republic exports water to irrigate the neighbouring states Uzbekistan, Kazakhstan and Tajikistan. To prevent conflicts, water allocation and use, and in particular the role of agriculture as major water user, have become very important questions in the development discourse in recent years, and will continue to be in the future.

Irrigation is extremely wasteful of water because the distribution infrastructure is old and poorly maintained. In 1993 only an estimated 5% of required maintenance expenditures was allocated. As of 1997, an estimated 70% of the nation's water supply network is in need of repair or replacement. The quality of drinking water from this aging system is poorly monitored—the water management staff has been cut drastically because of inadequate funds. Further, there is no money to buy new water disinfection equipment when it is needed. Some aquifers near industrial and mining centers have been contaminated by heavy metals, oils, and sanitary wastes. In addition, many localities rely on surface sources, making users vulnerable to agricultural runoff and livestock waste, which seep gradually downward from the surface. The areas of lowest water quality are the heavily populated regions of the Chui Valley and Osh and Jalal-Abad Regions, and areas along the rivers flowing into Ysyk-Köl.

In towns, wastewater collection provides about 70% of the water supply. Although towns have biological treatment equipment, as much as 50% of such equipment is rated as ineffective. The major sources of toxic waste in the water supply are the mercury mining combine at Haidarkan; the antimony mine at Kadamzai; the Kadzyi Sai uranium mine, which ceased extraction in 1967 but which continues to leach toxic materials into nearby Ysyk Köl; the Kara-Balta Uranium Recovery Plant; the Min Kush deposit of mine tailings; and the Kyrgyz Mining and Metallurgy Plant at Orlovka.

=== Land management ===
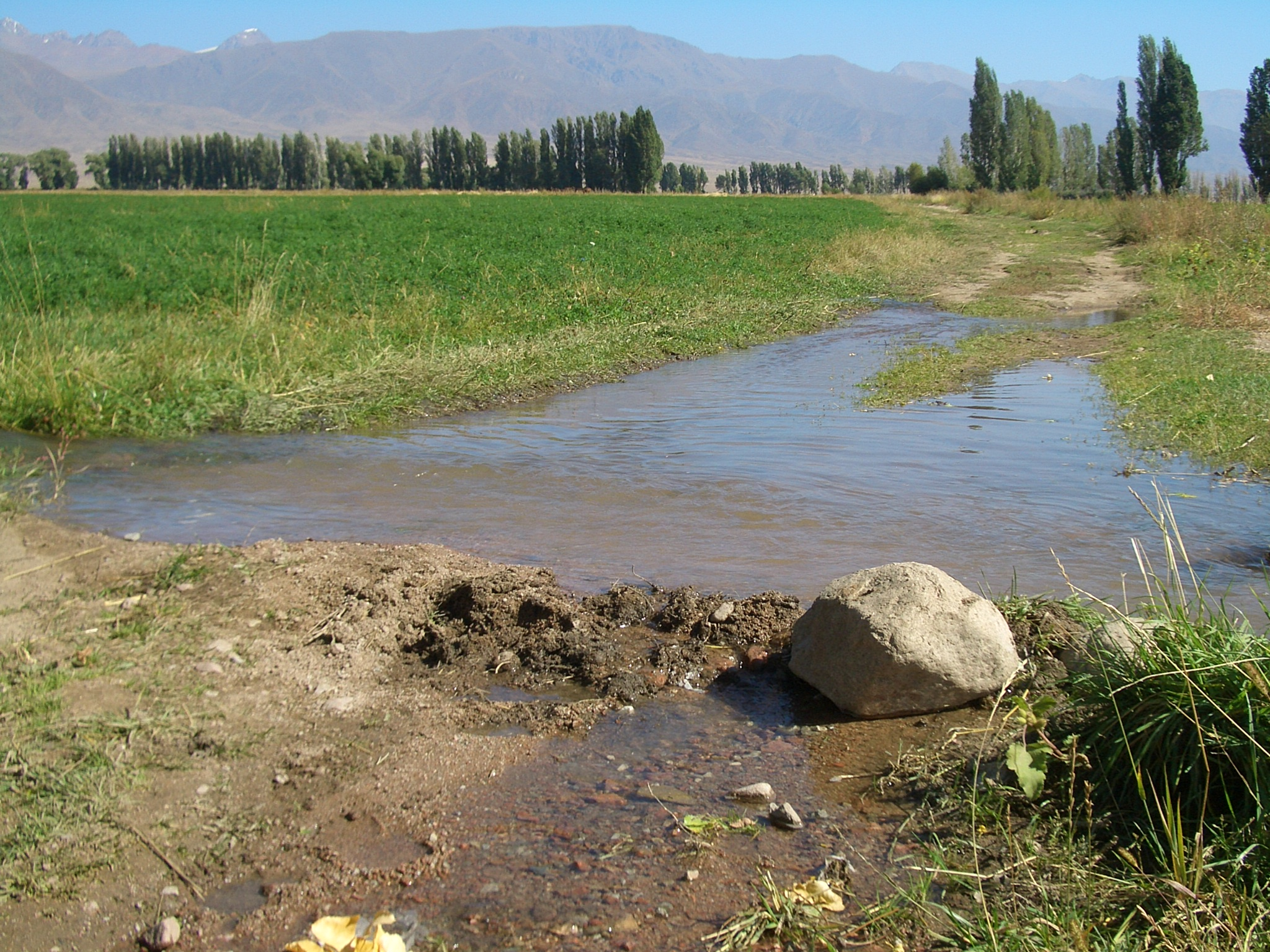
Low-cost water management in Tamchy, Issyk Kul Region.

The most important problems in land use are soil erosion and salinization in improperly irrigated farmland. An estimated 60% of Kyrgyzstan's land is affected by topsoil loss, and 6% by salinization, both problems with more serious long-term than short-term effects. In 1994 the size of livestock herds averaged twice the carrying capacity of pasturage land, continuing the serious overgrazing problem and consequent soil erosion that began when the herds were at their peak in the late 1980s. Uncertain land tenure and overall financial insecurity have caused many private farmers to concentrate their capital in the traditional form—livestock—thus subjecting new land to the overgrazing problem.

The inherent land shortage in Kyrgyzstan is exacerbated by the flooding of agricultural areas for hydroelectric projects. The creation of Toktogul Reservoir on the Naryn River, for example, involved the flooding of 130 km^{2} of fertile land. Such projects have the additional effect of constricting downstream water supply; Toktogul deprives the lower reaches of the Syr Darya in Uzbekistan and the Aral Sea Basin of substantial amounts of water. Because the Naryn Basin, where many hydroelectric projects are located, is very active seismically, flooding is also a danger should a dam be broken by an earthquake.

==== current environmental issues ====
Nuclear waste left behind by the Soviet Union in many open-air pits in hazardous locations. Water pollution; many people get their water directly from contaminated streams and wells; as a result, water-borne diseases are prevalent; increasing soil salinity from faulty irrigation practices. Illegal hunting of very rare species such as the snow leopard and the Marco Polo sheep.

==== international agreements about the environment ====
Party to
- Air Pollution
- Biodiversity
- Desertification
- Hazardous Wastes
- Ozone Layer Protection
- Wetlands

=== Aral Sea ===
In response to the internationally recognized environmental crisis of the rapid desiccation of the Aral Sea, the five states sharing the Aral Sea Basin (Kazakhstan, Kyrgyzstan, Tajikistan, Turkmenistan, and Uzbekistan) are developing a strategy to end the crisis. The World Bank and agencies of the United Nations (UN) have developed an Aral Sea Program, the first stage of which is funded by the five countries and external donors. That stage has seven areas of focus, one of which—land and water management in the upper watersheds—is of primary concern to Kyrgyzstan. Among the conditions detrimental to the Aral Sea's environment are erosion from deforestation and overgrazing, contamination from poorly managed irrigation systems, and uncontrolled waste from mining and municipal effluents. Kyrgyzstan's National Environmental Action Plan (NEAP) has addressed these problems as part of its first-phase priorities in cooperation with the Aral Sea Program.

=== Environmental policy making ===
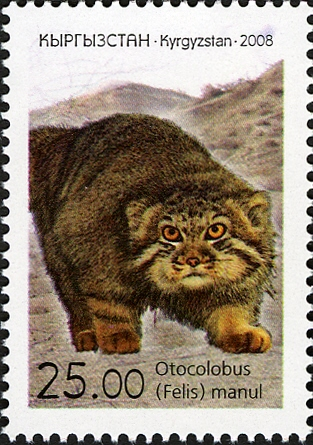
Pallas cat, the famous wild cat of Kyrgyzstan, celebrated on a postage stamp

The NEAP, adopted in 1994, is the basic blueprint for environmental protection. The plan focuses on solving a small number of critical problems, collecting reliable information to aid in that process, and integrating environmental measures with economic and social development strategy. The initial planning period is to end in 1997. The main targets of that phase are inefficient water resource management, land degradation, overexploitation of forest reserves, loss of biodiversity, and pollution from inefficient mining and refining practices.

Because of severe budget constraints, most of the funds for NEAP operations come from international sources, including official institutions such as the World Bank and the Asian Development Bank and numerous international nongovernmental organizations. Implementation is guided by a committee of state ministers and by a NEAP Expert Working Group, both established in 1994 by executive order. A NEAP office in Bishkek was set up with funds from Switzerland.

The main environmental protection agency of the Kyrgyzstan government is the State Committee on Environmental Protection, still known by its Soviet-era acronym, Goskompriroda. Established by the old regime in 1988, the agency's post-Soviet responsibilities have been described in a series of decrees beginning in 1991. In 1994 the state committee had a central office in Bishkek, one branch in each of the seven regions, and a total staff of about 150 persons. Because of poorly defined lines of responsibility, administrative conflicts often occur between local and national authorities of Goskompriroda and between Goskompriroda and a second national agency, the Hydrometeorological Administration (Gidromet), which is the main monitoring agency for air, water, and soil quality. In general, the vertical hierarchy structure, a relic of Soviet times, has led to poor coordination and duplication of effort among environmental protection agencies.

=== Specially protected areas ===
A number of protected nature areas have been designated by the government of the republic. As of the end of 2004, they included:

- Eight state nature reserves (zapovedniks), with a total area of 2,880 km^{2} (1,110 mi^{2})
- Nine state nature national parks (2,760 square kilometers or 1,070 square miles);
- Ten forest, twenty-three floral, eighteen geological, and two general-purpose protected areas (zakazniks), as well as fourteen game reserves, with the total area of 3,250 km^{2} (1,250 mi^{2})
- Lake Issyk Kul (so designated since 1998) and Sary-Chelek biosphere reserve (since 1978), together occupying the area of 282 km^{2} (109 mi^{2}).

== Area and boundaries ==
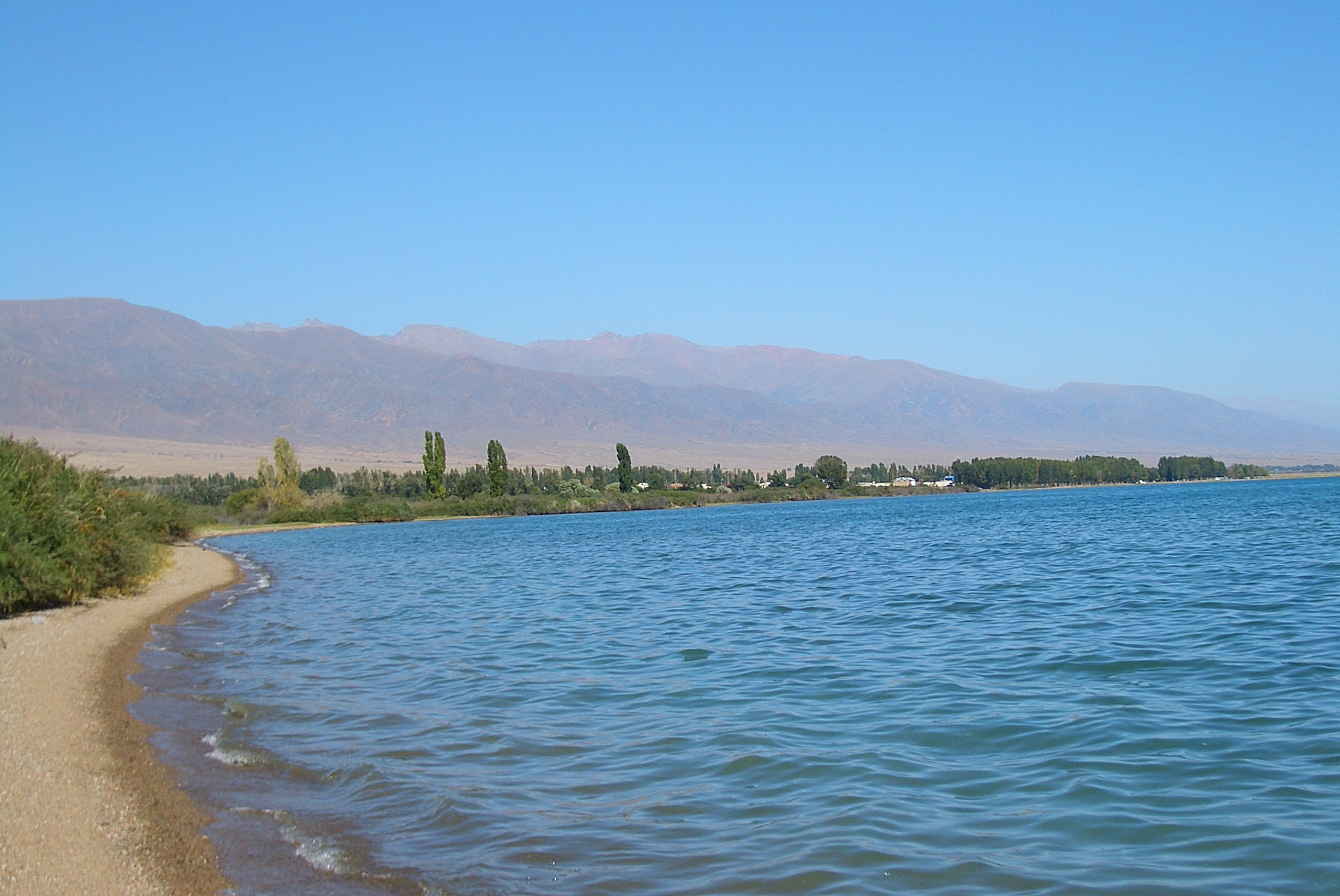
Tamchy Bay on Lake Issyk Kul

Area
- total: 198,951 km^{2} (76,815 mi^{2})
  - country rank in the world: 85th
- land: 191,801 km^{2} (74,055 mi^{2})
- water: 8,150 km^{2} (3,150 mi^{2})

Area — comparative
- Australia comparative: slightly less than three times the size of Tasmania
- Canada comparative: slightly less than half the size of Newfoundland and Labrador
- United Kingdom comparative: approximately 1 1/2 times the size of England
- United States comparative: approximately the size of South Dakota
- EU comparative: slightly less than 2/3 the size of Italy

Land boundaries
- total: 5,473 km (3,401 mi)
- border countries:
  - the People's Republic of China 1,063 km (661 mi)
  - Kazakhstan 1,212 km (753 mi)
  - Tajikistan 984 km (611 mi)
  - Uzbekistan 1,314 km (816 mi)

Coastline
0 km (landlocked)

Elevation extremes
- lowest point: Kara-Darya 132 m (433 ft)
- highest point: Peak Jengish Chokusu 7,439 m (24,406 ft)

== Resources and land use ==
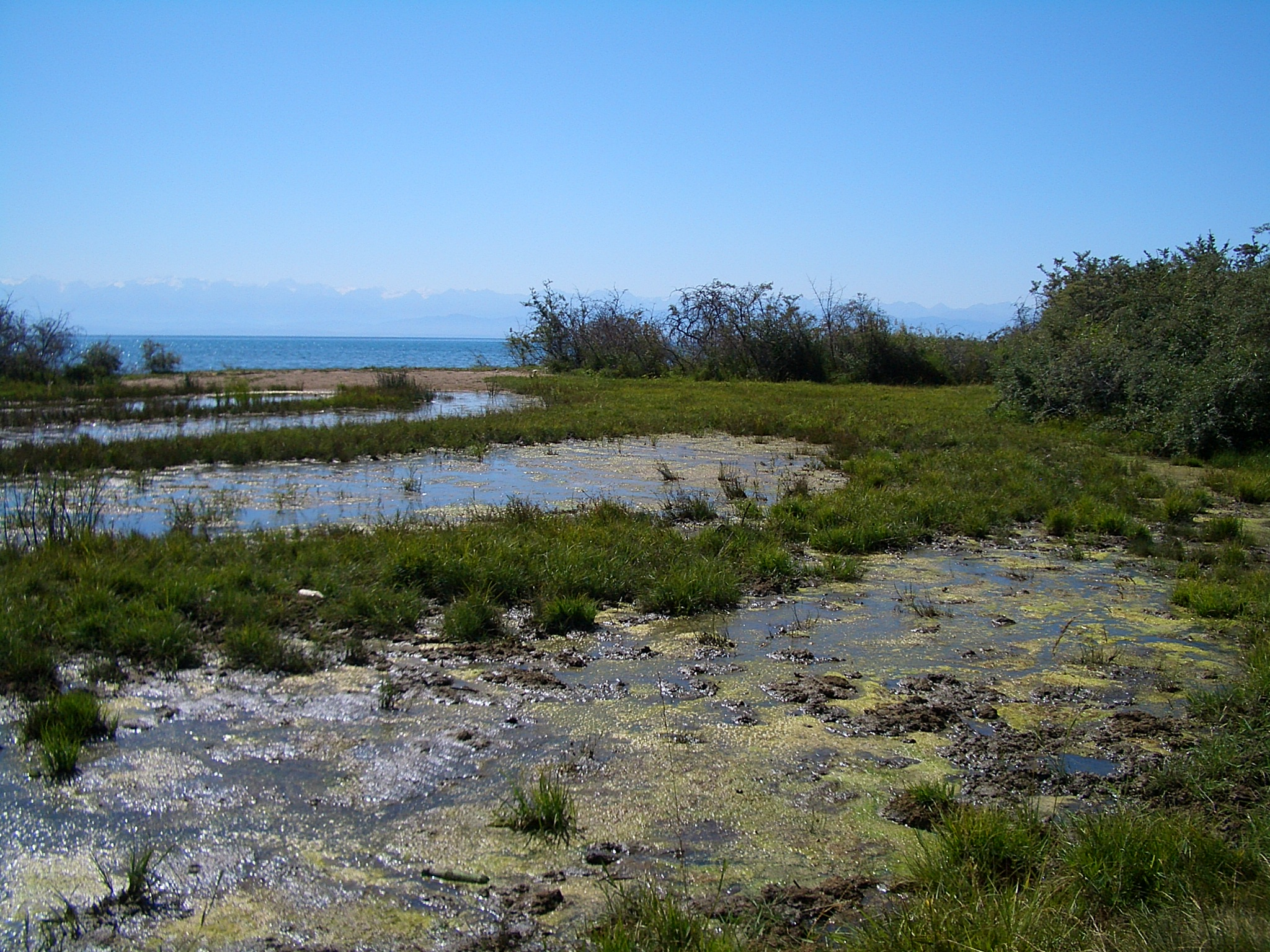
Wetlands along the shore of Lake Issyk Kul near Tamchy

Terrain: peaks of Tian Shan and associated valleys and basins encompass entire nation

Natural resources: abundant hydropower; significant deposits of gold and rare earth metals; locally exploitable coal, petroleum, and natural gas; other deposits of nepheline, mercury, bismuth, lead, and zinc.

Land use:
arable land: 6.7%
permanent crops: 0.4%
permanent pasture: 48.3%
forest: 5.1%
other: 93.24% (2011)
note: Kyrgyzstan has the world's largest natural growth walnut forest, Arslanbob, located in Jalal-Abad Region with an enormous variety of different genetic characteristics. It is believed that most of the world's walnut varieties derive from the original species still found here.

Irrigated land: 10,210 square kilometers (3,940 mi^{2}) (2005)

Total renewable water resources: 23.62 cubic kilometers (5.67 mi^{3}) (2011)
