= China–Kyrgyzstan border =

International border

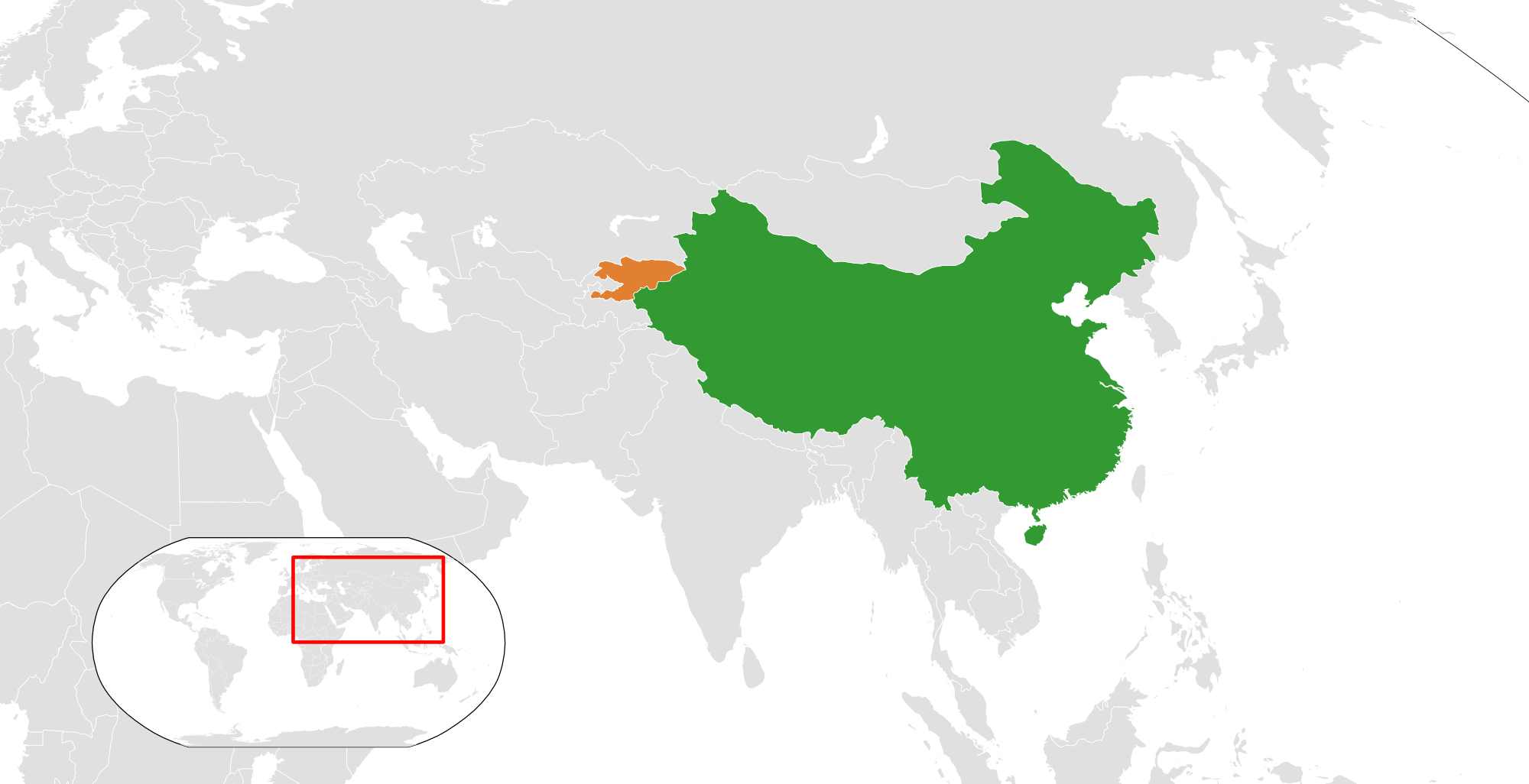
Borders of China (green) and Kyrgyzstan (orange)

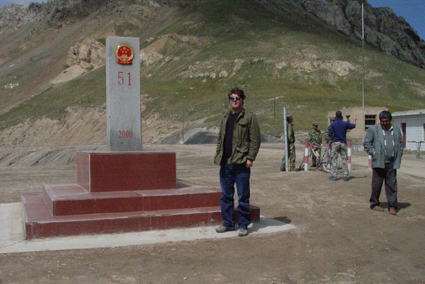
Boundary stone between China and Kyrgyzstan

Chinese and Kyrgyzstani boundary markers

The China–Kyrgyzstan border is 1,063 km (661 mi) in length and runs from the tripoint with Kazakhstan following a roughly south-west line across various mountain ridges and peaks of the Tian Shan range down to the tripoint with Tajikistan. The border divides (from north to south/east to west) Issyk-Kul Region, Naryn Region and Osh Region in Kyrgyzstan from Aksu Prefecture (to the north and east) and Kizilsu Kyrgyz Autonomous Prefecture (to the south and west) in Xinjiang Uygur Autonomous Region, China.

== History ==
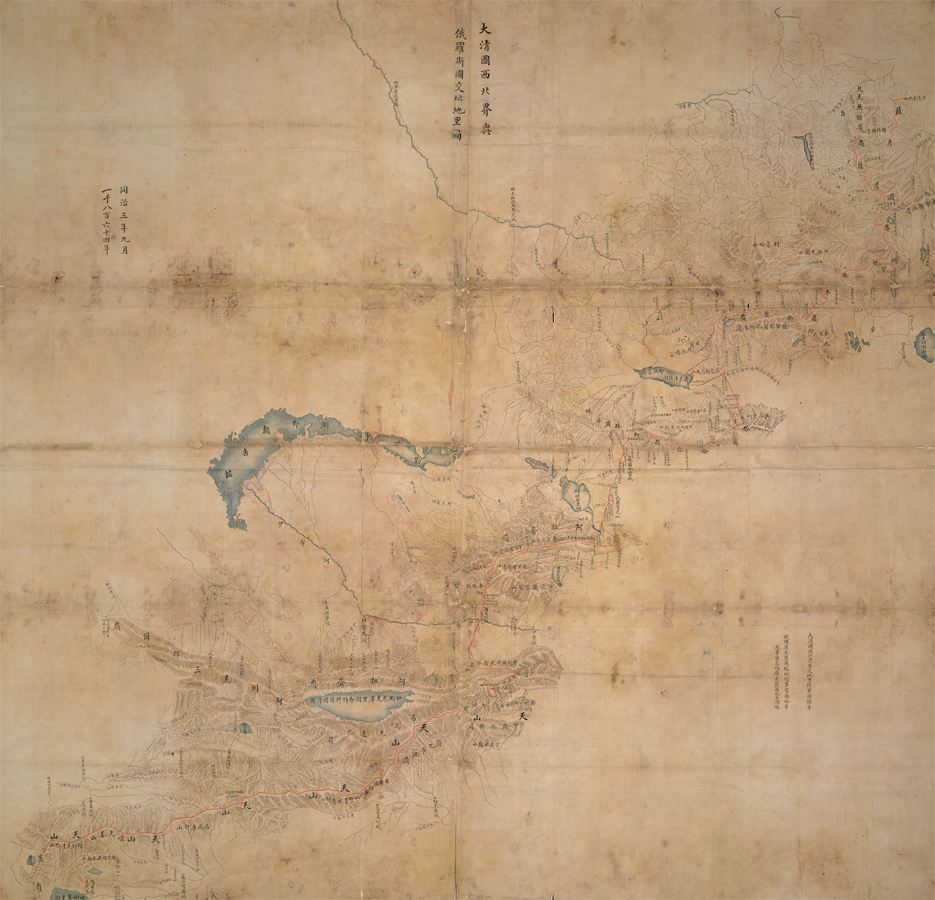
The Sino-Russian border set forth in the Protocol of Chuguchak (1864). Today's Sino-Kazakh/Kyrgyz border largely follows the line set in this protocol, with only fairly small changes

The origins of the border date from the mid-19th century, when the Russian Empire expanded into Central Asia and was able to establish its control over the Lake Zaysan region. The establishment of the border between the Russian Empire and the Qing Empire, not too different from today's Sino-Kazakh/Kyrgyz/Tajik border was provided for in the Convention of Peking of 1860; the actual border line pursuant to the convention was drawn by the Treaty of Tarbagatai (Chinese: 塔爾巴哈台; 1864) and the Treaty of Uliastai (Chinese: 烏里雅蘇台; 1870), leaving Lake Zaysan on the Russian side. The Qing Empire's military presence in the Irtysh basin crumbled during the Dungan revolt (1862–77). After the fall of the rebellion and the reconquest of Xinjiang by Zuo Zongtang, the border between the Russian and the Qing empires in the Ili River basin was further slightly readjusted, in Russia's favour, by the Treaty of Saint Petersburg (1881) and a series of later protocols. In 1915 an agreement was signed more precisely delimiting the border the Ili Valley and Dzungarian Alatau region. The southernmost section of the frontier (i.e. roughly the southern half of the modern China-Tajikistan border) remained undemarcated, owing partly to the ongoing rivalry between Britain and Russia for dominance in Central Asia known as the Great Game; eventually the two agreed that Afghanistan would remain an independent buffer state between them, with Afghanistan's Wakhan Corridor being created in 1895. China was not a party to these agreement and hence the southernmost section of the China-Russia boundary remained undefined.

When Kyrgyzstan became independent in 1991 it inherited a section of the USSR-China frontier. The two countries delimited their border in 1996. Formal demarcation was hampered by opposition to the border treaty by elements of the Kyrgyz opposition, centred on Azimbek Beknazarov, as part of a wider movement against then-President Askar Akayev culminating in the Tulip Revolution. The border agreement was finalised in 2009, with the People's Republic of China giving up part of the Khan Tengri Peak while Kyrgyzstan ceded the Uzengi-Kush, a mountainous area located south of the Issyk Kul region. This agreement along with the post-1949 border treaties are not recognized by the Republic of China's government based in Taipei; in which Kyrgyzstan does not recognize the legitimacy of the ROC under the One China principle.

In 2013 China began the Belt and Road Initiative and has interests in constructing a railway through central Asia to connect the European and Asian markets together. Kyrgyz locals clashed and protested against Chinese investors when China offered to construct a logistics centre in Kyrgyzstan worth 280 million US dollars. This has not stopped Chinese investment as China continued to sign economic deals with Kyrgyzstan through the means of the Sino-Kyrgyz Good Neighbor Cooperation Treaty first drafted in 2002 and the Joint Declaration of the Establishment of Sino-Kyrgyz Strategic Partnership in 2013. Kyrgyz media and locals have begun highlighting the unequal aspects of the recent treaties between China and have been pushing the Kyrgyzstan government to start placing more protective measures on Chinese investment in the country. Further deteriorating political relations between China and Kyrgyzstan is that factions of the East Turkestan Liberation Organization (ETLO) have been found training in Kyrgyzstan. China perceives the ETLO as a serious security threat and has thus maintained a high level of security on the border between Xinjiang and Kyrgyzstan. Additionally, with Kyrgyzstan being next to the Xinjiang province, Uygurs fleeing China have a tendency to seek asylum in central-Asian states such as Kyrgyzstan, Tajikistan, and Kazakhstan.

== Border crossings ==
- Torugart Pass (road)
- Irkeshtam pass (road)

Historically the Bedel Pass, further east along the Tian Shan mountains, has also been used. In 2024, it was re-opened under a simplified regime. The full-scale development is scheduled for completion in 2027.

== Historical maps ==
Historical maps of the China–Kirghiz Soviet Socialist Republic border from north to south (west to east) from the International Map of the World and Operational Navigation Chart, middle and late 20th century:

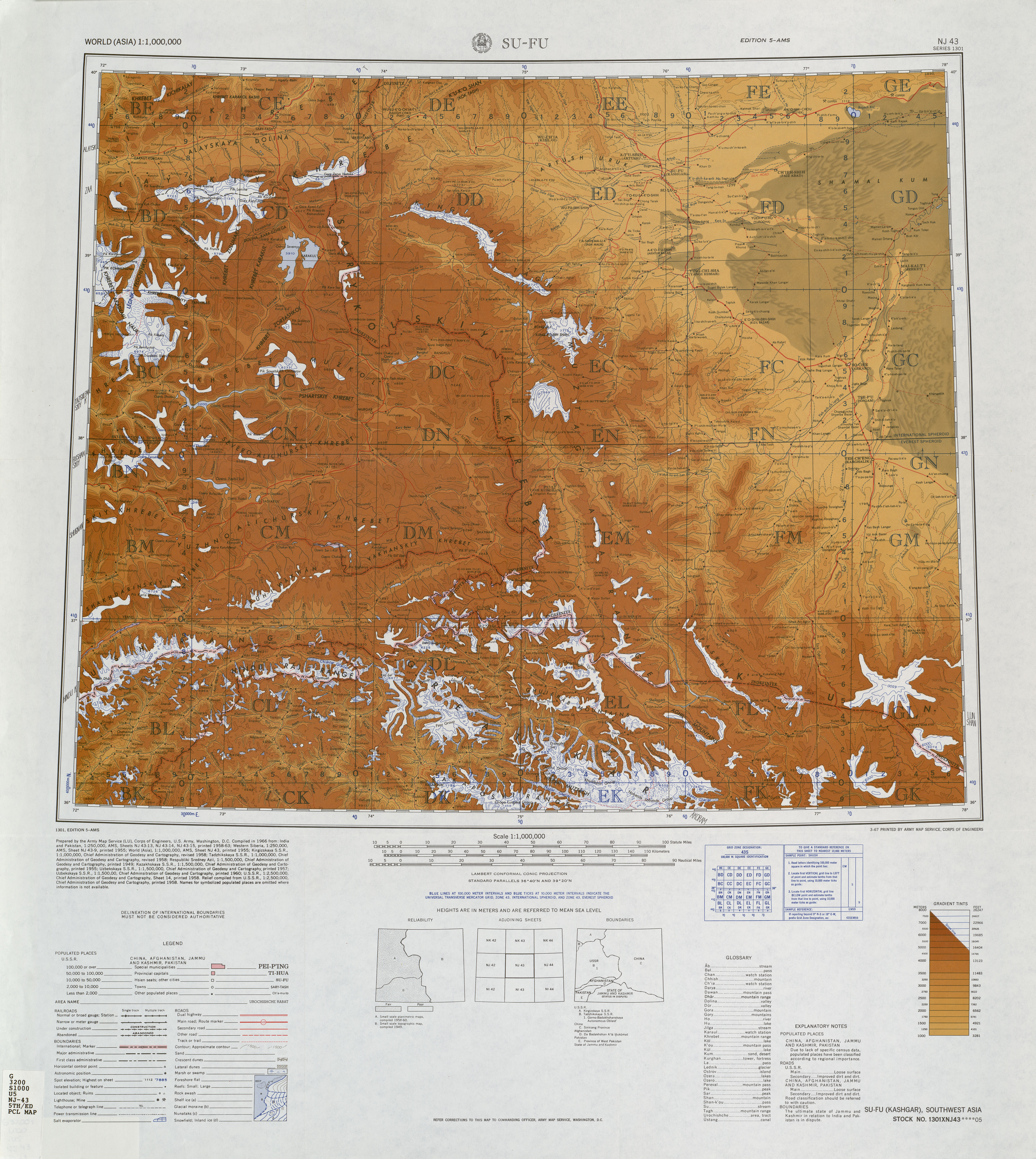
Map of the border (near Kashgar) including the tripoint with Tajikistan (International Map of the World, AMS, 1966) (Note: From map: "DELINEATION OF INTERNATIONAL BOUNDARIES MUST NOT BE CONSIDERED AUTHORITATIVE")

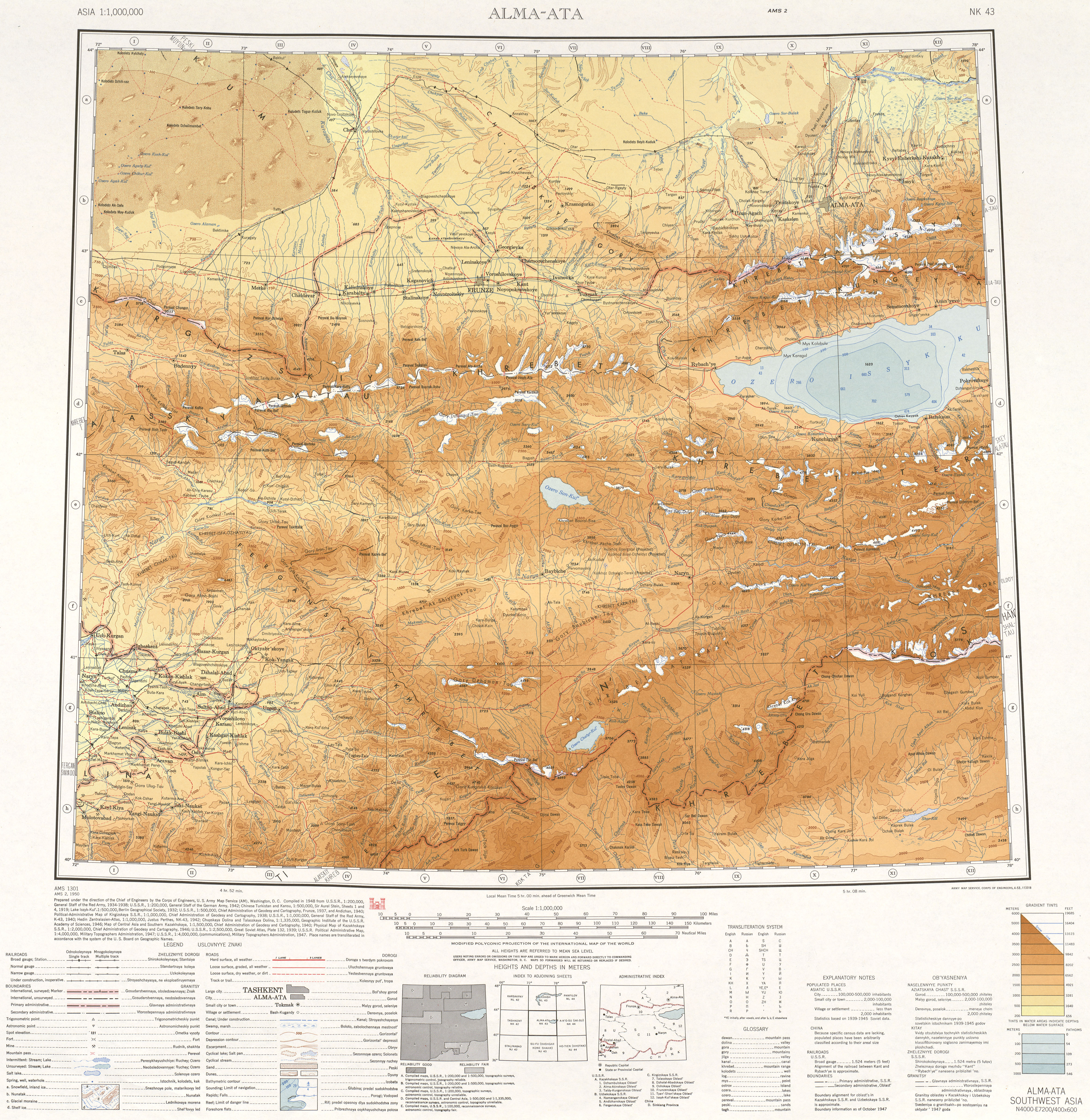
near Almaty

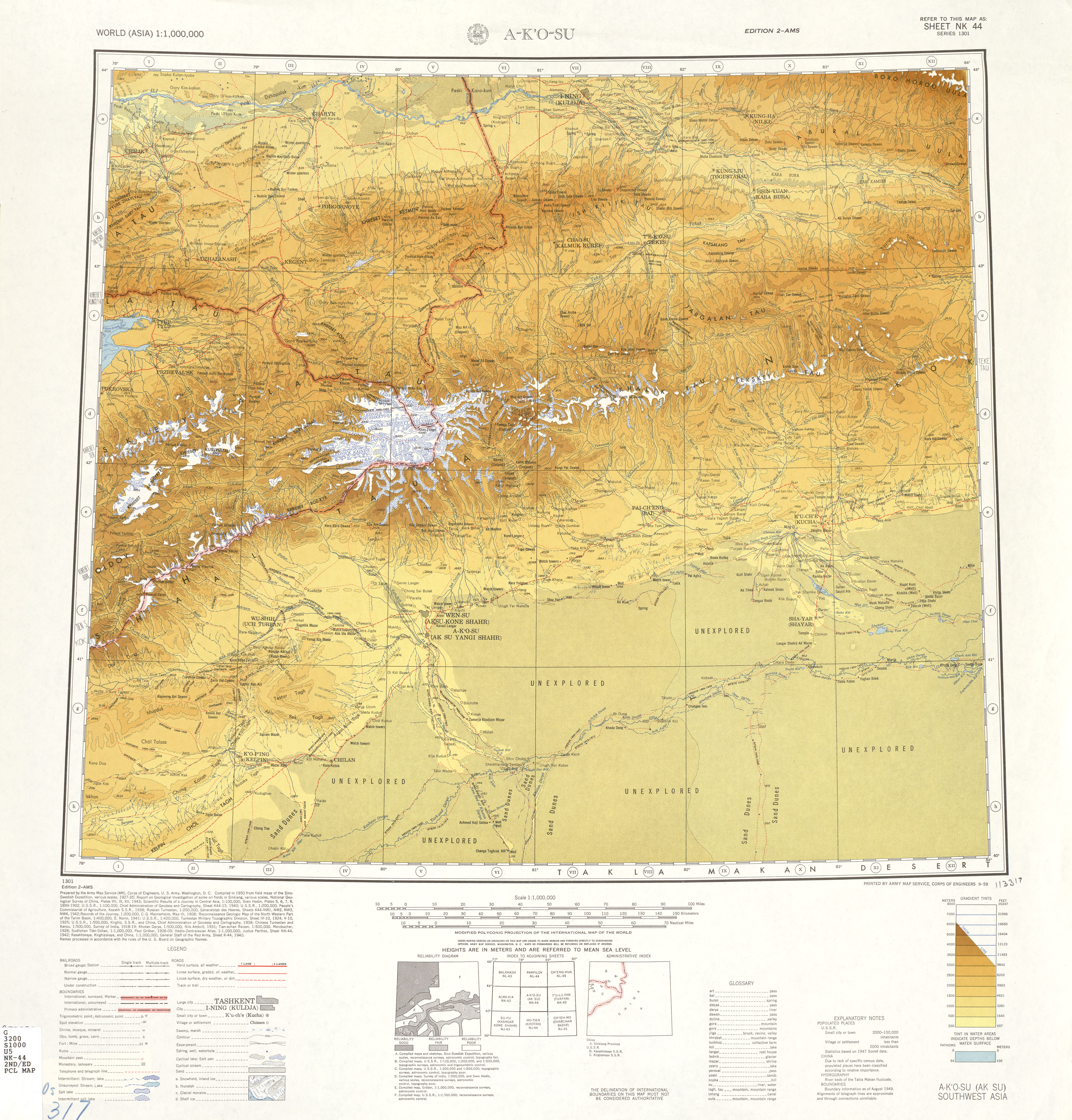
near Aksu City

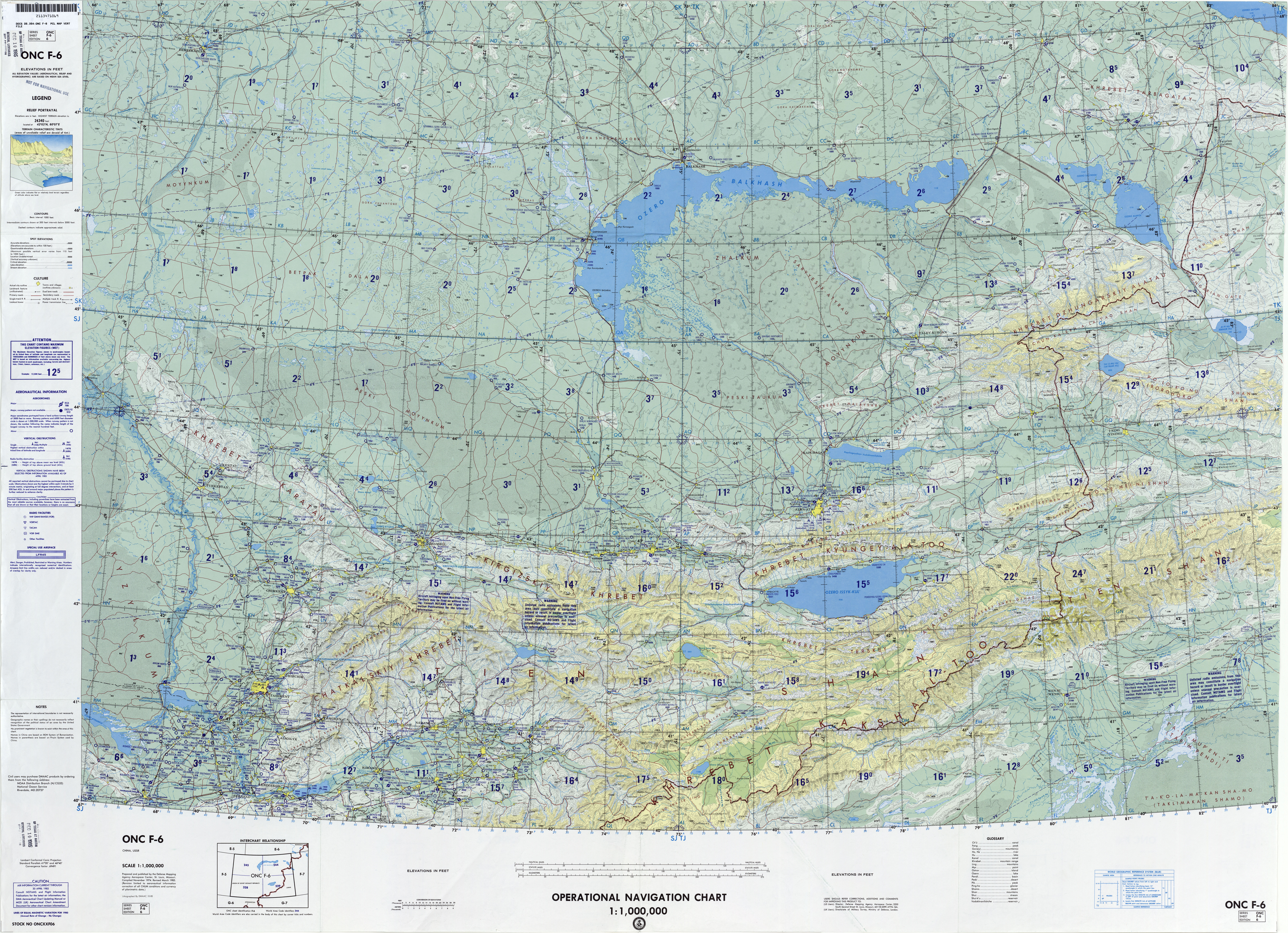
near Kazakh SSR (modern-day Kazakhstan)

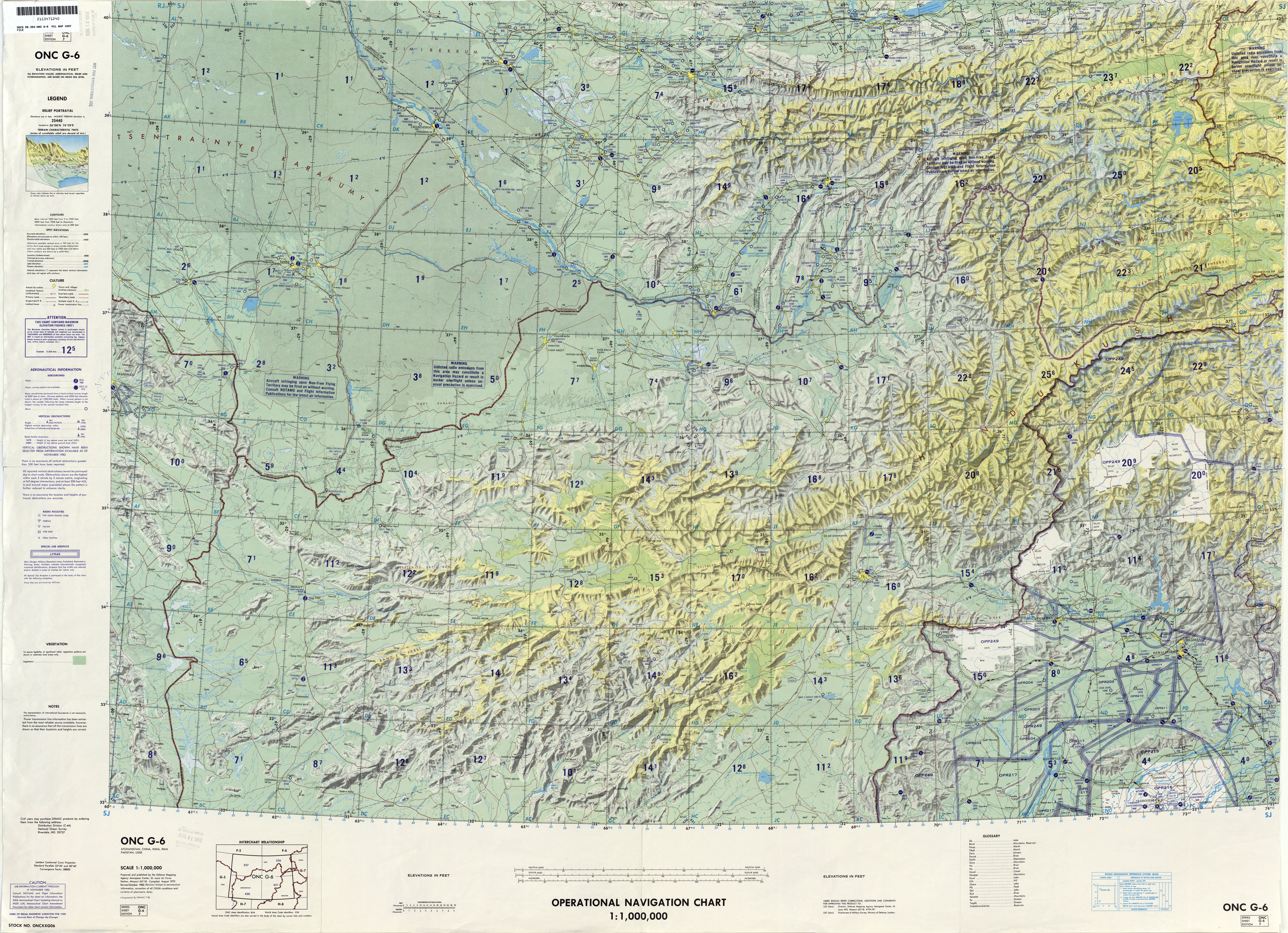
near Tajik SSR (modern-day Tajikistan)

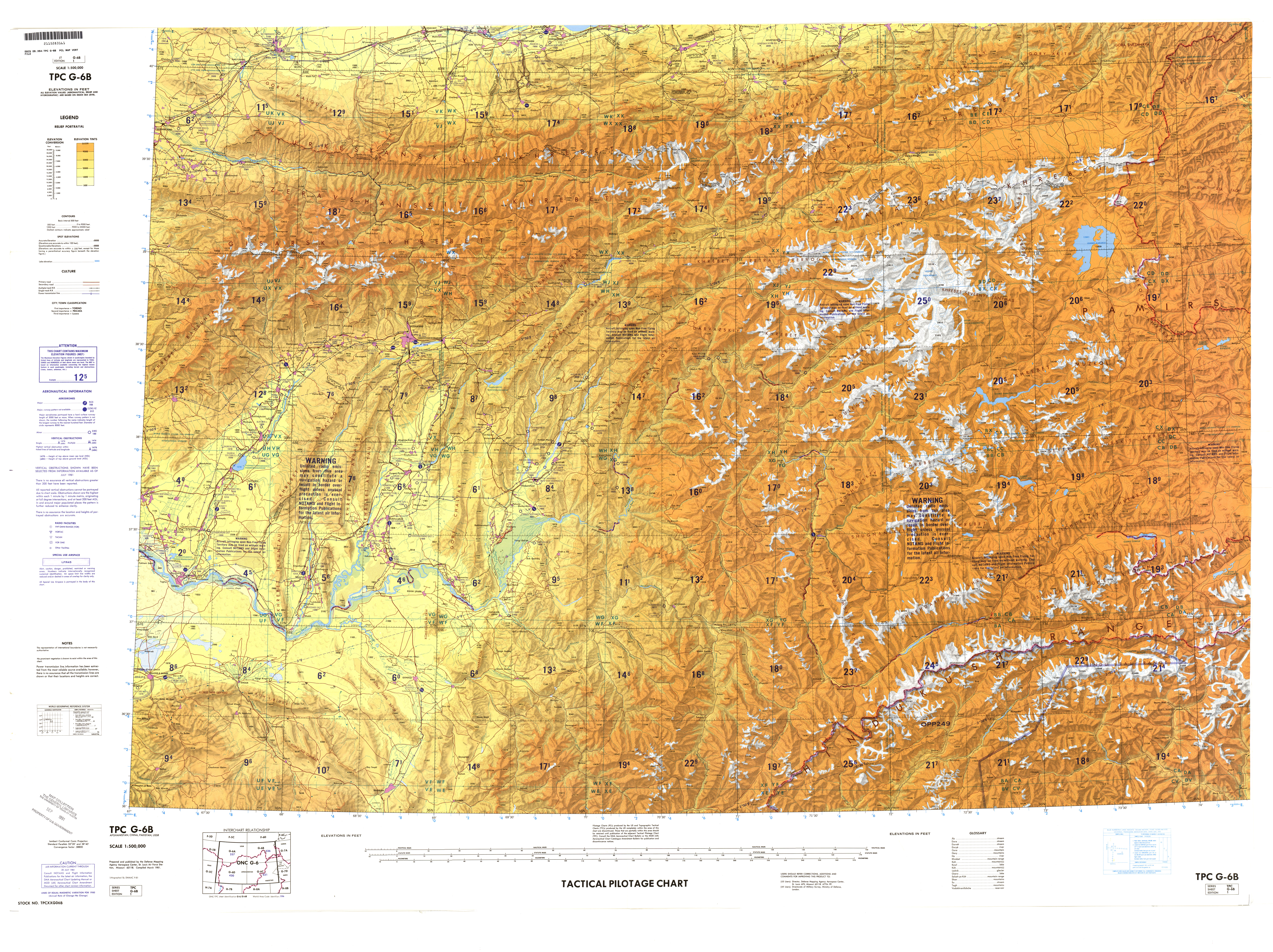

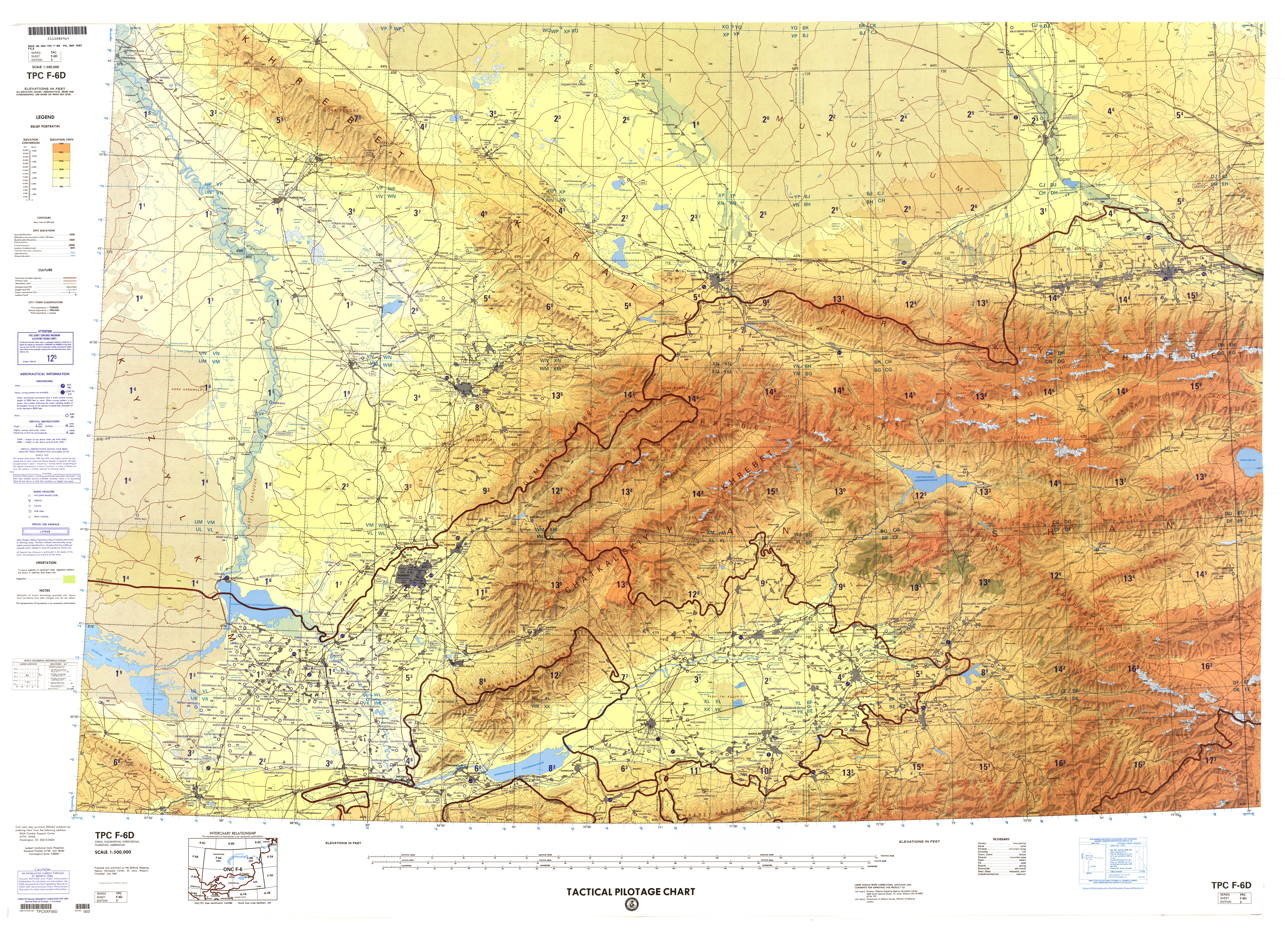

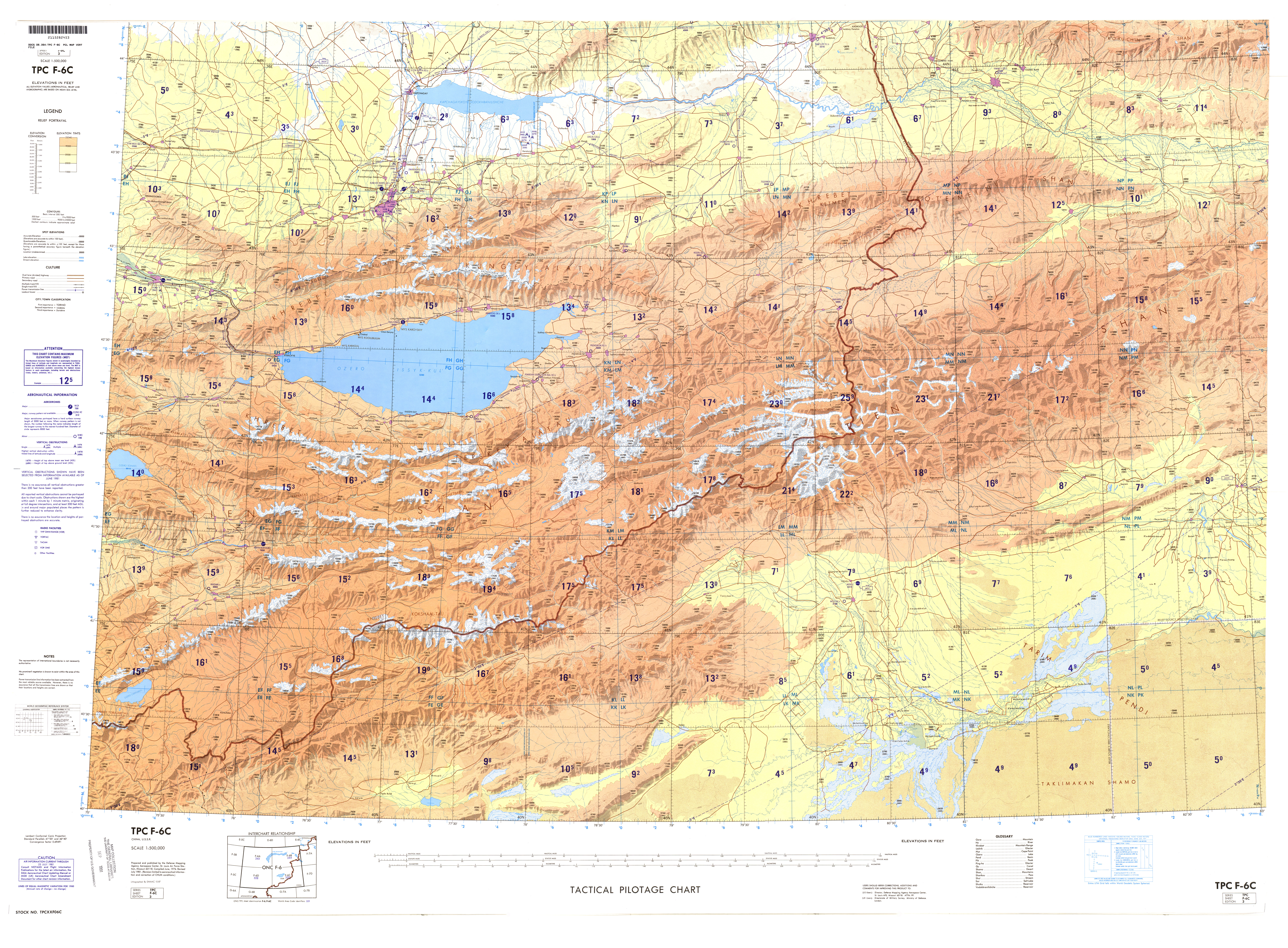

== See also ==
- Ports of entry of China
- Extreme points of Kyrgyzstan
