= Extreme points of Kyrgyzstan =

This is a list of the extreme points of Kyrgyzstan.

Extreme points of Kyrgyzstan

== Cardinal directions ==
Northernmost point: Sokuluk District, Chüy Region

Southernmost point: Chong-Alay District, Osh Region

Easternmost point: Ak-Suu District, Issyk-Kul Region

Westernmost point: Leilek District, Batken Region

== Elevation ==
At 7,439 m (24,406 ft) above sea level, Jengish Chokusu is the highest point of Kyrgyzstan.

At 132 m (433 ft) above sea level, the lowest point of Kyrgyzstan is in the Kara Darya (Kara-Daryya, Karadar'ya), which is a tributary of the Syr Darya, a river that flows into the North Aral Sea.

== See also ==
- Geography of Kyrgyzstan
- Extreme points of Asia
