= List of national parks of Kyrgyzstan =

As of 2017, there are 13 nature national parks (IUCN Category II) in Kyrgyzstan occupying 724,670.2 hectares. The first park - Kyrgyz National Park Ala-Archa - was established in 1976.

Image	Name	Name in Kyrgyz	Area, ha	Established	Link
	Kyrgyz National Park Ala-Archa	Аларча мамлекеттик жаратылыш паркы	16,484.5	1976	
	Kyrgyz-Ata State Nature Park	Кыргызата мамлекеттик жаратылыш паркы	11,172.0	1992	
	State Nature National Park Besh-Tash	Бешташ мамлекеттик жаратылыш паркы	13,650	1996	
	Kara-Shoro State Nature Park	Карашоро мамлекеттик жаратылыш паркы	14,440.2	1996	
	Karakol State Nature Park	Каракол мамлекеттик жаратылыш паркы	38,256	1997	
	Chong-Kemin State Nature Park	Чоң Кемин мамлекеттик жаратылыш паркы	123,654.0	1997	
	Salkyn-Tor State Nature Park	Салкын-Төр мамлекеттик жаратылыш паркы	10,419.0	2001	
	Saymaluu-Tash State Nature Park	Саймалуу Таш мамлекеттик жаратылыш паркы	24,393	2001	
	Sarkent State Nature Park	Саркент мамлекеттик жаратылыш паркы	39,999.4	2009	
	Kara-Buura State Nature Park	Карабуура мамлекеттик жаратылыш паркы	61,543.9	2013	
	Kan-Achuu State Nature Park	Кан-Ачуу мамлекеттик жаратылыш паркы	30,496.5	2015	
	Alatay State Nature Park	Алатай мамлекеттик жаратылыш паркы	56,826.4	2016	
	Khan-Tengri State Nature Park	Хан-Тенири мамлекеттик жаратылыш паркы	275,800.3	2016	
