= Salkyn-Tör Nature Park =

National park in Naryn Region, Kyrgyzstan

- Салкын-Төр мамлекеттик жаратылыш паркы
- IUCN category II (national park)
- Location within Kyrgyzstan
- Location: Naryn District, Naryn Region, Kyrgyzstan
- Nearest city: Naryn
- Coordinates: 41°26′N 76°11′E
- Area: 10,419 ha (104.19 km^{2})
- Established: 25 May 2001

Salkyn-Tör Nature Park (Kyrgyz: Салкын-Төр мамлекеттик жаратылыш паркы) is a national park in Naryn District, Naryn Region, Kyrgyzstan, about 20 km east of Naryn. Established on 25 May 2001, it covers 10,419 ha (104.19 km^{2}) and is classified as an IUCN Category II protected area.

== Geography ==
The park lies in the mountainous Inner Tien Shan. A study of its vegetation describes much of its territory as lying at elevations of 2,500–4,000 m, with harsh climatic conditions and extensive rocky terrain. Plant communities vary with elevation, slope aspect and other environmental factors.

Natural features include rocky gorges, Kojo-Üngkür cave and the Kurga spring.

=== Climate ===
The climate is strongly continental, with large seasonal and daily temperature variations. Surrounding mountain ranges restrict the arrival of moisture-bearing air from the west and northwest. Mean annual precipitation is 200–300 mm, with up to 65% falling in spring and summer. Summers are warm, with rain concentrated in the first half of the season; autumn is short, dry and cool. The first autumn frosts generally occur in late September. The frost-free period averages 150–160 days, and the growing season lasts approximately 145 days.

=== Hydrology ===
The park's rivers and streams originate in glaciers and snowfields of the Naryn-Too range, including snowfields formed by avalanches. They include Teke-Sekirik, Alysh, Kur-Say, Kurgak, Doboluu and Kuu-Dongoch. There are also about 30 springs within the park.

== Biodiversity ==
=== Vegetation ===
The park's flora comprises approximately 300 plant species.

Vegetation is distributed across four principal altitudinal belts: steppe, forest and subalpine vegetation, alpine meadow, and glacial–nival terrain.

- The steppe belt, at 2,100–3,000 m, occurs mainly on south-facing slopes. Grasses and wormwood form relatively sparse communities, with plant cover of about 30–40%.
- The forest and subalpine belt, at 2,200–3,100 m, includes spruce forests, shrubs, meadows and meadow-steppe. Tien Shan spruce forests occur in patches on steep north-facing slopes, while creeping juniper grows on slopes of various aspects. Shrubs include rowan, honeysuckle, wild roses, currants, willows and sea buckthorn. Subalpine meadows are concentrated on north-facing, northeast-facing and northwest-facing slopes and have plant cover of 90–100%.
- The alpine meadow belt, at 3,000–3,500 m, occupies the upper river valleys. Trees are generally absent, and the vegetation consists of low-growing plants with cover of about 50–70%.
- The glacial–nival belt, above 3,800 m in the southern part of the park, is dominated by glaciers, snowfields, rocky ridges and scree. Vegetation is sparse and occurs mainly near its lower boundary.

Plant communities include wormwood-dominated vegetation, steppe, meadow, wetland, forest and shrub communities. Their composition varies between sunny and shaded slopes, while rocky habitats support plants adapted to these conditions.

=== Fauna ===
Maral deer occur in the park. Mammals reported from the park include bears, lynxes, stone martens, wild goats, roe deer, wolves, foxes, badgers and marmots. Birds include snowcocks and chukars.

== History and management ==
The park was established by Government Decree No. 249 of 25 May 2001, which also established Saimaluu-Tash Nature Park. Its stated objectives were to improve environmental conditions in Kyrgyzstan and conserve the natural landscapes of the Salkyn-Tör area.

On 14 February 2008, Government Decree No. 49 amended the park's founding decree to include 22.3 ha of land belonging to the Dobolu village council. It also transferred the adjoining Salkyn-Tor recreation area's land and property complex to the park. The revised land schedule listed a total area of 10,470.3 ha.

Functional zoning was carried out in 2010 and approved in 2013. The review records a strict protection zone of 2,472.8 ha, a tourism and recreation zone of 272.6 ha, and a zone of limited economic activity of 7,673.6 ha.
