= Maksat Kunakunov =

Kyrgyz politician (born 1981)

- Максат Касымжанович Кунакунов

Member of the Jogorku Kenesh of Kyrgyzstan
- In office 2007–2010
- President: Kurmanbek Bakiyev

Personal details
- Born: Maksat Kasymjanovich Kunakunov; 2 January 1981 (age 45) Bishkek, Kyrgyz SSR, Soviet Union (now Kyrgyzstan)
- Citizenship: Kyrgyzstan
- Party: Liberal Progressive Party (2005—present)
- Other political affiliations: Ak Jol (2007—2010)

Maksat Kunakunov (Kyrgyz: Максат Касымжанович Кунакунов; 2 January 1981, Frunze) is a Kyrgyz statesman and politician. Leader of the Liberal Progressive Party. Member of the Jogorku Kenesh of the IV convocation.

== Early life ==
Maksat Kunakunov was born in the city of Frunze (now Bishkek).

=== Education ===
In 2003 he graduated from the Kyrgyz-European Faculty of IIMOP of the Kyrgyz National University, Master of Economics and Management.

In 2007 he got a law degree from the Kyrgyz State Law Academy under the Government of the Kyrgyz Republic. In 2009, Kunakunov completed the International Relations Management program for advanced training at the Diplomatic Academy of the Ministry of Foreign Affairs of the Russian Federation.

=== Career ===
In 1997 Maksat Kunakunov began his career as the director of the “Mandarin youth information program” at the Kyrgyz Television.

From 1999 to 2001, he worked as an assistant at the Institute for Regional Studies, and from 2002 to 2004 he is chief specialist of the Economic Development Fund under the Ministry of Finance of the Kyrgyz Republic.

In 2004–2005, Maksat Kunakunov held the position of a leading procurement specialist at Manas International Airport.

From 2006 to 2007 he worked as the head of the Department of the State Agency for Procurement and Material Reserves under the Government of the Kyrgyz Republic.

== Political activity ==
In 2005 he created the Liberal Progressive Party.

In 2007 he was elected as a member of the Jogorku Kenesh of Kyrgyzstan of the IV convocation from the Ak Jol party. At the time of his election to parliament, Kunakunov became the youngest deputy in the history of Kyrgyzstan. In 2007–2009, he served as Deputy Chairman of the Committee on Economy, Budget and Finance of the Jogorku Kenesh of Kyrgyzstan. Since 2009, he is member of the parliamentary faction of the Ak Jol party.

Over the three years of his activity as a deputy, he initiated 20 laws, including those aimed at:

- improving the investment climate in Kyrgyzstan (4 laws);
- ensuring human rights (3 laws);
- improving the activities of state structures (5 laws);
- improving the functioning of the financial market (3 laws);
- the law “Foundations of state youth policy”;
- ensuring the conditions for entrepreneurial activity (5 laws).

He was the chairman of the Interparliamentary Commission of the Jogorku Kenesh of the Kyrgyz Republic and the Federal Assembly of the Russian Federation. As part of the commission's activities, an additional publication of textbooks of the Russian language and literature, the opening of a branch of the Kyrgyz-Russian Slavic University in Osh, and various cultural and educational events were initiated. Organization of a permanent forum of young politicians from the two countries.

In 2011, he was appointed advisor to the Chairman of the Jogorku Kenesh of the V convocation.

In 2011–2015, he was a lecturer at the Kyrgyz-Russian Slavic University, Faculty of International Relations.

== Political views ==
Kunakunov supports changing the model of state structure and development of the state, introducing state ideology, changing the Constitution of Kyrgyzstan.

Kunakunov speaks Kyrgyz, Russian, English and French.

== Awards ==
- 2009 — Excellence in Trade and Economic Work, Ministry of Economic Development and Trade of the Kyrgyz Republic;
- 2009 — Excellence in Financial and Economic Work, Ministry of Finance of the Kyrgyz Republic;
- 2009 — jubilee medal 70 years of the Jogorku Kenesh of the Kyrgyz Republic;
- 2010 — Excellence in Service.
