= Ministry of Justice (Kyrgyzstan) =

Government ministry of Kyrgyzstan

Ministry of Justice of the Kyrgyz Republic
- Кыргыз Республикасынын Юстиция министрлиги Министерство юстиции Кыргызской Республики

Agency overview
- Formed: 1927
- Jurisdiction: Government of Kyrgyzstan
- Headquarters: 32 Mahatma Gandhi Street, Bishkek, Kyrgyzstan
- Minister responsible: Marat Dzamankulov
- Parent department: Ministry of Justice of the Kyrgyz SSR
- Child agency: Constitutional Court of Kyrgyzstan

The Ministry of Justice of Kyrgyzstan is a Kyrgyz government ministry tasked with developing the judicial system in Kyrgyzstan.

== Functions and Duties ==
Since 1940, the ministry's responsibilities included the following:

- Management courts of the judicial system, criminal, civil and procedural provisions of the Code of execution of mergers and acquisitions, as well as to control the availability of judicial practice
- Organizing judicial of elections, the organization of courts and judges to guide the organizational and economic services;
- Instructing and supervising judicial institutions
- Management of court cases
- The supervision and implementation of laws

== History ==
It was created in 1927 as the People's Commissar of Justice. At the end of the Second World War, it became known as the Ministry of Justice of the Kyrgyz SSR. The ministry was reorganized in 1970, and by 1991, it underwent another reorganization upon the independence of Kyrgyzstan from the USSR.

== List of ministers ==
A complete list of ministers of justice since 1927:

=== People's Justice Commissioner of the Kyrgyz SSR ===
- Tashmuhamed Khudaiberganov (1927-1929)
- Alexander Jolomanov (1929 -1934)

=== People’s Commissar of Justice of the USSR ===
- Karatal (1935-1937)
- Anatoly Shulgin (1939-1940)
- Sergey Klimov (1940-1942)
- Ali Mammadov Safar Hussein Zade (1942-1943)

=== Minister of Justice of the RSFSR ===
- Ivan Lavrenkov (1945-1949)
- Rashid Tashkulov (1949-1952)
- Khodzhent Shamenov (1953-1958)
- Mukhtarbek Zhumabaev (1970-1980)
- Jumabek Abakirov (1981-1983)
- Askar Abdıraliev (1983-1986)
- Madan Alymbekov (1986-1989)
- Busurmankul Tabaldiev (1989-1991)

=== Minister of Justice of the Kyrgyz Republic ===
- Usup Mukambaev (1992-1993)
- Cholponbaev Şaltakoviç (1993-1995)
- Larisa Gutnichenko (1995-1998)
- Nelja Bejshenalieva (1998-2001)
- James Abdrakhmanov (2001-2002)
- Ilya Daniyar (2002)
- Kurmanbek Ergeshovich (2002-2004)
- Nelja Bejshenalieva (2004-2005)
- Marat Kayipov (2005-2008)
- Nurlan Tursunkulov (2008-2009)
- Abdiev Abdievich (2009-2010)
- Aida Salyanova (2010)
- Abylai Mukhamedzhanov (2010-2011)
- Almambet Shykmamatov (2011-2015)
- Jyldyz Mambetaliyeva (2015-2016)
- Uran Akhmetov (2016-2018)
- Ainur Abdildaeva (2018-present)

== See also ==
- Justice ministry
- Politics of Kyrgyzstan
