= Politics of Kyrgyzstan =

The politics of Kyrgyzstan takes place in the framework of a presidential system representative democratic republic, whereby the President is head of state and the Chairman of the Cabinet of Ministers is head of government. Executive power is exercised by the government. Legislative power is vested in both the government and parliament. The Economist Intelligence Unit rated Kyrgyzstan an "authoritarian regime" in 2022.

Unlike one of its neighbors Turkmenistan, Kyrgyzstan has had a more pluralistic political system since the collapse of the Soviet Union. Kyrgyzstan has swung between authoritarian and democratic forms of government. Three authoritarian presidents have been ousted from office since 2005 due to popular protests.

== Political history ==
In the first years of Kyrgyzstan's full independence, President Askar Akayev appeared wholeheartedly committed to the reform process. However, despite the backing of major Western donors, including the International Monetary Fund (IMF), Kyrgyzstan had consequential economic difficulties from the outset. These came mainly as a result of the breakup of the Soviet trade bloc, which impeded the Republic's smooth transfer to a free-market economy.

In 1993, allegations of corruption against Akayev's closest political associates blossomed into a major scandal. One of those accused of improprieties was Vice President Feliks Kulov, who resigned for ethical reasons in December. Following Kulov's resignation, Akayev dismissed the government and called upon the last communist premier, Apas Djumagulov, to form a new one. In January 1994, Akayev initiated a referendum asking for a renewed mandate to complete his term of office. He received 96.2% of the vote.

A new Constitution was passed by the Parliament in May 1993. In 1994, however, the Parliament failed to produce a quorum for its last scheduled session prior to the expiration of its term (February 1995). President Akayev was widely accused of having manipulated a boycott by a majority of the parliamentarians. Akayev, in turn, asserted that the communists had caused a political crisis by preventing the legislature from fulfilling its role. Akayev scheduled an October 1994 referendum, overwhelmingly approved by voters, that proposed two amendments to the Constitution, one that would allow the Constitution to be amended by means of a referendum, and the other creating a new bicameral parliament called the Jogorku Keņesh.

Elections for the two legislative chambers – a 35-seat full-time assembly and a 70-seat part-time assembly – were held in February 1995 after campaigns considered remarkably free and open by most international observers, although the election-day proceedings were marred by widespread irregularities. Independent candidates won most of the seats, suggesting that personalities prevailed over ideologies. The new Parliament convened its initial session in March 1995. One of its first orders of business was the approval of the precise constitutional language on the role of the legislature.

Kyrgyzstan's independent political parties competed in the 1996 parliamentary elections. A February 1996 referendum – in violation of the Constitution and the law on referendums – amended the Constitution to give President Akayev more power. It also removed the clause that parliamentarians be directly elected by universal suffrage. Although the changes gave the President the power to dissolve Parliament, it also more clearly defined Parliament's powers. Since that time, Parliament has demonstrated real independence from the executive branch.

An October 1998 referendum approved constitutional changes, including increasing the number of deputies in the upper house, reducing the number of deputies in the lower house, rolling back Parliamentary immunity, reforming land tender rules, and reforming the state budget.

Two rounds of Parliamentary elections were held on 20 February 2000 and 12 March 2000. With the full backing of the United States, the Organization for Security and Co-operation in Europe (OSCE) reported that the elections failed to comply with commitments to free and fair elections and hence were invalid. Questionable judicial proceedings against opposition candidates and parties limited the choice of candidates available to Kyrgyz voters, while state-controlled media reported favorably on official candidates only and government officials put pressure on independent media outlets that favored the opposition.

In 2002 Azimbek Beknazarov, a leading opposition figure, was imprisoned by the local authorities, in what many believe to be politically motivated circumstances. This led to protests resulting in clashes with police forces, culminating in the death of five people in Jalal-Abad.

As May approached the authorities further extended their hold on power, imprisoning the vocal former presidential ally, Feliks Kulov, to ten years for alleged "abuses of office". During the same month the entire government resigned, accepting blame for the loss of life during the protests earlier in the year. A new government led by Nikolay Tanayev was then formed.

In November the President faced yet more protests, as the opposition announced it would march on the capital and demand his resignation. The police reacted by arresting large amounts of demonstrators, further adding to international disapproval at the authoritarian nature of Akayev's government.

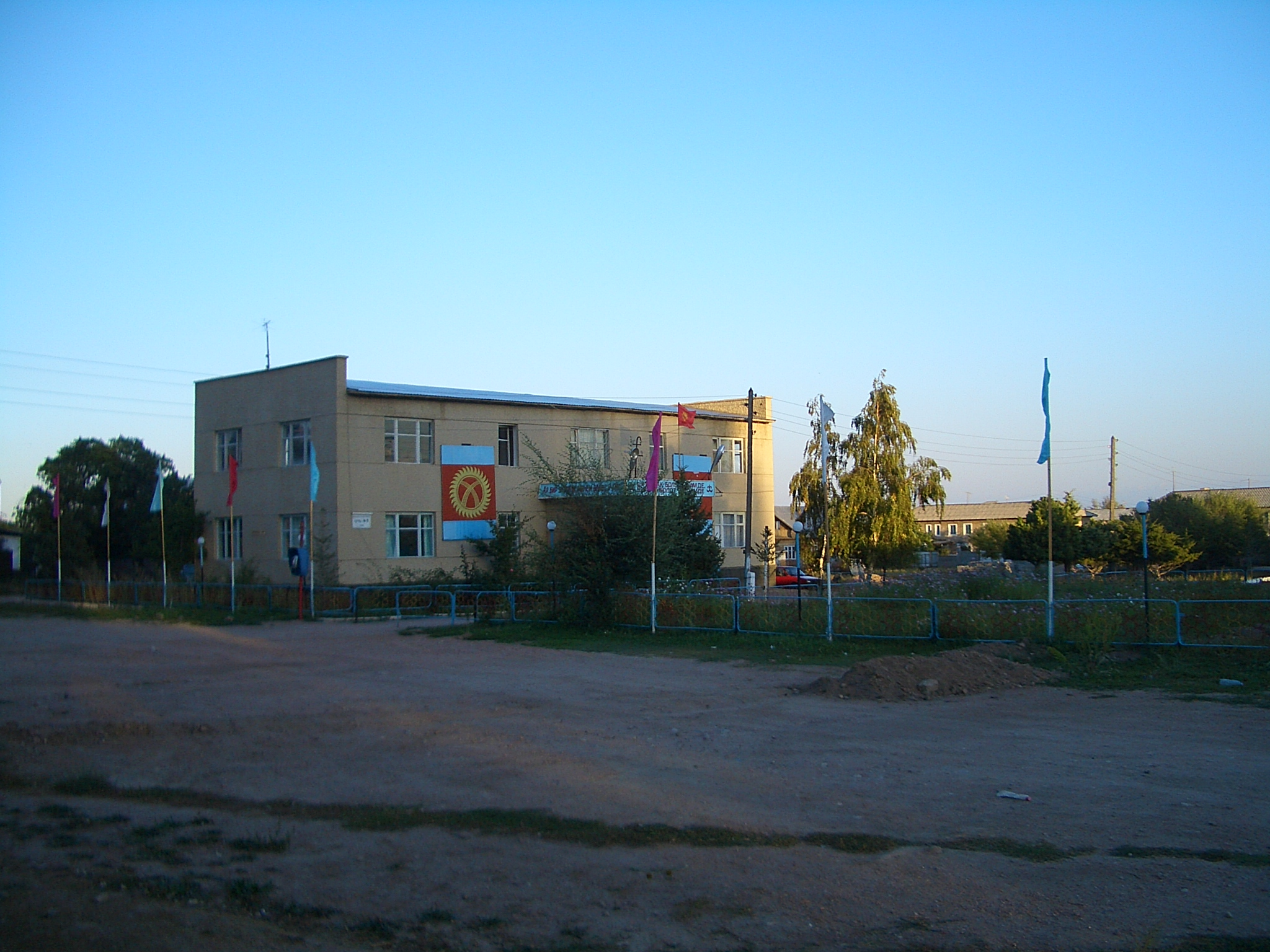
Government office building in the village of Tamchy, Issyk-Kul Region

By June 2003, the lower house of Parliament announced that President Akayev and two other leaders of Kyrgyzstan, from the Soviet era, would be given lifetime immunity from prosecution, raising the prospect of Akayev finally stepping down.

In 2005, following disputed results of the 2005 parliamentary elections, Kyrgyzstan was thrown into a state of political turmoil, with different parties claiming that they were the legitimate government. On 10 July 2005 interim President and opposition People's Movement leader Kurmanbek Bakiyev won the presidential election in a landslide victory. (See: Tulip Revolution).

In 2006, Bakiyev faced a political crisis as thousands of people demonstrated in a series of protests in Bishkek. They accused him of reneging on promised constitutional reforms limiting presidential power and giving more authority to the parliament and cabinet. They also accused him of failing to eradicate corruption, crime, and poverty. Bakiyev in turn accused the opposition of plotting a coup against him. Several parliamentarians had been killed during the political unrest.

Presidential elections, originally expected in 2010, were rescheduled for 23 July 2009. President Bakiyev was widely expected to retain his mandate, while the opposition United People's Movement (OND) announced on 20 April 2009 that it would field a single candidate – Social Democratic Party leader Almaz Atambayev. The election turnout was reported at 79.3%. As of 00:45 local time in Kyrgyzstan on 25 July 2009 (with 2058 of 2330 polling districts reporting), Bakiyev had won the election with 83.8% of the vote.

In assessing the election, the OSCE stated that Bakiyev had gained an "unfair advantage" and that media bias "did not allow voters to make an informed choice." Additionally, they found that the election was "marred by many problems and irregularities", citing ballot stuffing and problems with the counting of votes. On polling day Atambayev withdrew his candidacy claiming widespread fraud, stating "due to massive, unprecedented violations, we consider these elections illegitimate and a new election should be held." An opposition rally of 1,000 people in Balykchy on election day was broken up by riot police.

The arrest of an opposition figure on 6 April 2010 in the town of Talas led opposition supporters to protest. The protestors took control of a governmental building, demanding a new government. Riot police were sent from Bishkek, and managed to temporarily regain control of the building. Later the same day several more opposition figures were arrested, while the government claimed to have regained control of the situation. The following day, however, hundreds of opposition supporters gathered in Bishkek and marched on the government headquarters. Security personnel attempted to disperse the protestors with the use of stun grenades and live rounds, at the cost of dozens of lives. The protests continued, however, resulting in the flight of President Bakiyev to his southern stronghold of Jalal-Abad, and the freeing later the same day of the arrested opposition figures. A new government was formed under opposition leader Roza Otunbayeva, while Bakiyev remained for several days in southern Kyrgyzstan, before fleeing to Belarus, where he was given asylum by President Lukashenko. The new interim government held consultations on a new constitution, intended to increase the powers of the parliament and reduce those of the president. A referendum was held on the resulting document on 27 June 2010, and was approved by over 90% of voters, with a turnout of 72%. Elections were subsequently held on 10 October 2010. These elections resulted in five parties reaching the 5% threshold necessary to enter parliament.

Presidential elections were held in 2011, resulting in the victory of Almazbek Atambayev. In 2017, he endorsed Prime minister Sooronbay Jeenbekov for president, who won that year's presidential contest. After Atambayev retired from presidency, he began criticizing Jeenbekov and their relations worsened over time. Soon Atambayev was accused of corruption by the Jeenbekov administration. Clashes grew between security forces and Atambayev supporters, exacerbating political turmoil. Political insurgency in Kyrgyzstan amplified following controversy about the conduct of October 2020 Kyrgyz parliamentary election, where only four parties met the 7% threshold to achieve parliamentary representation, three of whom were closely aligned with the government. Opposition supporters claimed that these elections were tainted by vote buying and many other forms of irregularities. The protests resulted in en masse resignation of government officials. In October 2020, President Sooronbay Jeenbekov resigned after protests caused by irregularities in parliamentary elections on 4 October 2020. In January 2021, Sadyr Japarov was elected as the new president after winning the presidential election by landslide.

In April 2021, the majority of voters approved in the constitutional referendum a new constitution that would give new powers to the president, strengthening significantly the presidency.

== Executive branch ==
Main office-holders
Office	Name	Party	Since
President	Sadyr Japarov	Mekenchil	28 January 2021
Chairman of the Cabinet of Ministers	Adylbek Kasymaliev	Ar-Namys	12 October 2021

The president is elected by popular vote for a maximum of two five-year terms. The chairman of the Cabinet of Ministers is appointed by the president and approved by the Supreme Council.

=== Cabinet of Ministers ===
==== Akylbek Japarov Government ====
Since 13 October 2021:

- Chairman of the cabinet of ministers – Akylbek Japarov
  - First Deputy Chairman – Arzybek Kojoshev
  - Deputy Chairman – Edil Baisalov
  - Deputy Chairman – Bakyt Torobaev
  - Deputy Chairman, Head of SCNS – Kamchybek Tashiev
- Minister of Foreign Affairs – Jeenbek Kulubaev
- Minister of Agriculture – Askar Janybekov
- Minister of Digital Development – Talantbek Imanov
- Minister of the Economy – Daniyar Amangeldiev
- Minister of Education and Science – Almazbek Beishenaliev
- Minister of Emergency Situations – Boobek Ajikeev
- Minister of Culture, Information and Tourism – Azamat Jamankulov
- Minister of Finance – Almaz Baketaev
- Minister of Health Care – Jarkynbek Kasymbekov
- Minister of Internal Affairs – Ulan Niyazbekov
- Minister of Justice – Ayaz Baetov
- Minister of Transport and Communication – Erkinbek Osoev
- Minister of Energy – Doskul Bekmurzaev
- Minister of Labor, Welfare and Migration – Kudaibergen Bazarbaev
- Minister of Defence – Baktybek Bekbolotov
- Minister of Natural Resources, Environment and Technical Supervision – Dinara Kutmanova

== Legislative branch ==
In the Soviet era, Kyrgyzstan had a unicameral legislature which was replaced in 1995 by the bicameral Supreme Council (Joghorku Keneš). The Supreme Council consisted of the Assembly of People's Representatives (45 seats; members were elected by popular vote from single member constituencies) and the Legislative Assembly (60 seats; 45 members of which were elected by popular vote from single member constituencies, and 15 of which were from national party lists on a proportional basis with a 5% threshold). All legislative terms were five years.

In 2005, as part of the 2005 election process and in accordance with a 2003 referendum, the Parliament again became unicameral. The Legislative Assembly (Myizam Chygaruu Jyiyny) had 75 members, elected for five-year terms from single-seat constituencies.

However, because of the political unrest, a new constitutional referendum was held on 21 October 2007 which approved a new electoral system, enlarged the parliament to 90 members and introducing party-list voting. Party-list voting is a proportional representation system of voting, where candidates are selected from central party lists rather than locally elected. Early parliamentary elections were held on 16 December 2007.

== Political parties and elections ==
=== 2021 presidential election ===
As of 14 November 2020, 63 individuals had filed applications to run for the office. On 4 December, the Central Committee on Elections announced the final list of 19 approved candidates.

It was announced that whilst the requirements for candidacy had been provisionally met by all 19, the final number was subject to decrease pending verification of the signatures provided within their applications. Candidates were permitted to begin formally campaigning from the 15th of December 2020, with 'early' presidential elections scheduled for January 10, 2021.

All candidates officially ran as independents, although some were supported by their respective political parties. On the final electoral ballot were listed 17 candidates including: Sadyr Japarov – aforementioned interim President following the resignation of former-President Sooronbai Jeenbekov – former head of the State National Security Committee (Государственный Комитет Национальной Безопасности) Abdil Segizbayev, journalist Kanybek Imanaliev, ex-deputy head of the Ministry of Internal Affairs (МВД) Kursan Asanov, and entrepreneur Arstanbek Abdyldaev. There was one female registered presidential candidate.

According to a 2021 report by the OSCE (the Organization for Security and Co-operation in Europe), the verification of signatures by the Central Committee on Elections (Центральная Избирательная Комиссия Киргизской Республики) was "transparent and consistent".

Sadyr Japarov won the election handily, receiving nearly 80% of the vote. A total of 10,851 ballots returned were invalid, in addition to 196 which were retrieved from invalid portable ballot boxes. Turnout was 39.16%. The results of the simultaneous constitutional referendum meant that Kyrgyzstan would resort to a 'presidential', rather than a 'parliamentary' style of government.

Fewer than 40% of eligible voters participated in these 'snap' presidential elections. According to Radio Free Europe/ Radio Liberty's Kyrgyz service (Azattyk.org) out of a national 'voting' population of 3.56 million, only 1.354 million ballots were cast. Sadyr Japarov received the 2nd highest percentage of votes in the entire history of Kyrgyz presidential elections – falling just short of Kurmanbek Bakiev's 89.5% in 2005.

According to a 2021 report by the OSCE (the Organization for Security and Co-operation in Europe), the January presidential election in Kyrgyzstan was "well organized and fundamental freedoms were generally respected". However, presidential elections were conducted in synchronicity with 'snap' constitutional referendums that "weakened both the election process and public debate". It is critical that this election was "dominated by one candidate who benefitted from disproportionately large financial means and misuse of administrative resources, resulting in an uneven playing field". Whilst the legal framework of these elections "provides a sound basis for democracy", allegations of such misuse of administrative resources may include the "directed attendance of state employees at rallies... pressure on state officials and voters, as well as concerns about the involvement of organised crime in the election." It is also significant that gender equality issues were "nearly absent" from the campaign.

By the end of 2021, Kyrgyzstan's status according to the 'Freedom of the World Index' declined from 'Partly Free', to 'Not Free' as a result of "deeply flawed parliamentary elections [that] featured significant political violence and intimidation that culminated in the irregular seizure of power...".

Candidate	Party	Votes	%
Sadyr Japarov	Mekenchil	1,105,248	79.83
Adakhan Madumarov	United Kyrgyzstan	94,741	6.84
Babur Tolbayev	Independent	32,979	2.38
Myktybek Arstanbek	Bir Bol	23,583	1.70
Abdil Segizbaev	Independent	20,335	1.47
Imamidin Tashov	Independent	16,383	1.18
Klara Sooronkulova	Reform	14,005	1.01
Aymen Kasenov	Independent	12,684	0.92
Ulukbek Kochkorov	New Age	9,397	0.68
Kanatbek Isaev	Kyrgyzstan	8,038	0.58
Eldar Abakirov	Independent	6,996	0.51
Baktybek Kalmamatov	Independent	6,893	0.50
Kursan Asanov	Independent	6,885	0.50
Ravshan Jeenbekov	Independent	2,652	0.19
Kanybek Imanaliev	Ata-Meken	2,490	0.18
Jenishbek Baiguttiev	Independent	1,327	0.10
Arstanbek Abdyldayev	For the People	1,157	0.08
Against all		18,673	1.35
Total		1,384,466	100.00
Valid votes		1,384,466	99.21
Invalid/blank votes		11,047	0.79
Total votes		1,395,513	100.00
Registered voters/turnout		3,563,574	39.16
Source: CEC, CEC

=== 2020 parliamentary elections ===
Unity received a plurality of votes, beating out the Ata-Zhurt–Mekenim Kyrgyzstan alliance by under one percent, with 46 seats. Ata-Zhurt–Mekenim Kyrgyzstan received 45 seats, while other parties lagged behind. The Kyrgyzstan Party received 16 seats, while United Kyrgyzstan entered parliament for the first time with 13. Several other parties failed to meet the 7% threshold, including Ata Meken, which had been a part of every parliament since the 2010 Kyrgyz Revolution.

Out of the parties that made it into parliament, only United Kyrgyzstan consistently opposes the incumbent government led by President Jeenbekov.

Party	Votes	%	Seats	+/–
Unity	469,098	24.85	46	New
Mekenim Kyrgyzstan	452,971	24.00	45	New
Kyrgyzstan	166,861	8.84	16	–2
United Kyrgyzstan	139,736	7.40	13	+13
Mekenchil	132,807	7.04	0	New
Respublika	111,302	5.90	0	New
Ata Meken Socialist Party	78,165	4.14	0	–11
Light of Faith	64,715	3.43	0	New
Bir Bol	58,389	3.09	0	–12
Great Crusade	44,769	2.37	0	New
Zamandash	41,720	2.21	0	0
Social Democrats	41,023	2.17	0	New
Reform Party	31,788	1.68	0	New
Homeland Accord	12,021	0.64	0	New
The Centre	4,185	0.22	0	New
Party of Veterans of the Afghan War	3,288	0.17	0	New
Against all	34,512	1.83	–	–
Total	1,887,350	100.00	120	0
Valid votes	1,887,350	98.51		
Invalid/blank votes	28,607	1.49		
Total votes	1,915,957	100.00		
Registered voters/turnout	3,523,554	54.38		
Source: CEC

== Political pressure groups and leaders ==
- Council of Free Trade Unions
- Kyrgyz Committee on Human Rights – Ramazan Dyryldayev
- National Unity Democratic Movement
- Union of Entrepreneurs
- Central Asian Free Market Institute
- Kyrgyz Choroloru Movement

== Judicial branch ==
Although the constitution provides for an independent judiciary, Kyrgyzstan's court system is widely seen as under the influence of the prosecutor's office. Low salaries make the bribery of judges commonplace. Most cases originate in local courts; they then can move via the appeals process to municipal or regional courts, with the Supreme Court the final court of appeals. Property and family law disputes and low-level criminal cases are heard by traditional elders' courts, which are loosely supervised by the prosecutor's office. Economic disputes and military cases are heard in specialized courts. The constitutional amendments of 2003 expanded the scope of the Supreme Court in civil, criminal, and administrative proceedings. Many protections of Western jurisprudence are not present in Kyrgyzstan's system, which retains many features of the Soviet system. The right to counsel and the presumption of innocence of the accused are guaranteed by law but often not practiced. There is no trial by jury. Reform legislation under consideration in 2006 would establish a jury system and bolster the independence of the judicial branch.

The Prosecutor General's Office of Kyrgyzstan oversees the enforcement of the Kyrgyz legal system and the activities of law enforcement agencies and the sentencing of criminals in concert with the judiciary.

== Administrative divisions ==
Kyrgyzstan is divided into seven Regions (oblustar, singular – oblus) and two region-level cities* (shaar):

- Batken Region (Batken)
- Bishkek*
- Chüy Region (Bishkek)
- Issyk-Kul Region (Karakol)
- Jalal-Abad Region (Jalal-Abad)
- Naryn Region (Naryn)
- Osh*
- Osh Region (Osh)
- Talas Region (Talas)

note: administrative center names in parentheses

== International organization participation ==
- AsDB
- CIS
- EAPC
- EBRD
- ECO
- FAO
- IBRD
- ICAO
- ICCt (signatory)
- ICRM
- IDA
- IDB
- IFAD
- IFC
- IFRCS
- ILO
- IMF
- INOGATE
- Interpol
- IOC
- IOM
- ISO (correspondent)
- ITU
- NAM (observer)
- OIC
- OPCW
- OSCE
- PCA
- PFP
- SCO
- UN
- UNAMSIL
- UNCTAD (UNECE)
- United Nations Economic Commission for Europe
- UNESCO
- UNIDO
- UNMIK
- UPU
- WCO
- WFTU
- WHO
- WIPO
- WMO
- WToO
- WTO
- UNICEF
