= Ayaz Baetov =

Kyrgyz lawyer and politician (born 1984)

- Аяз Баетов
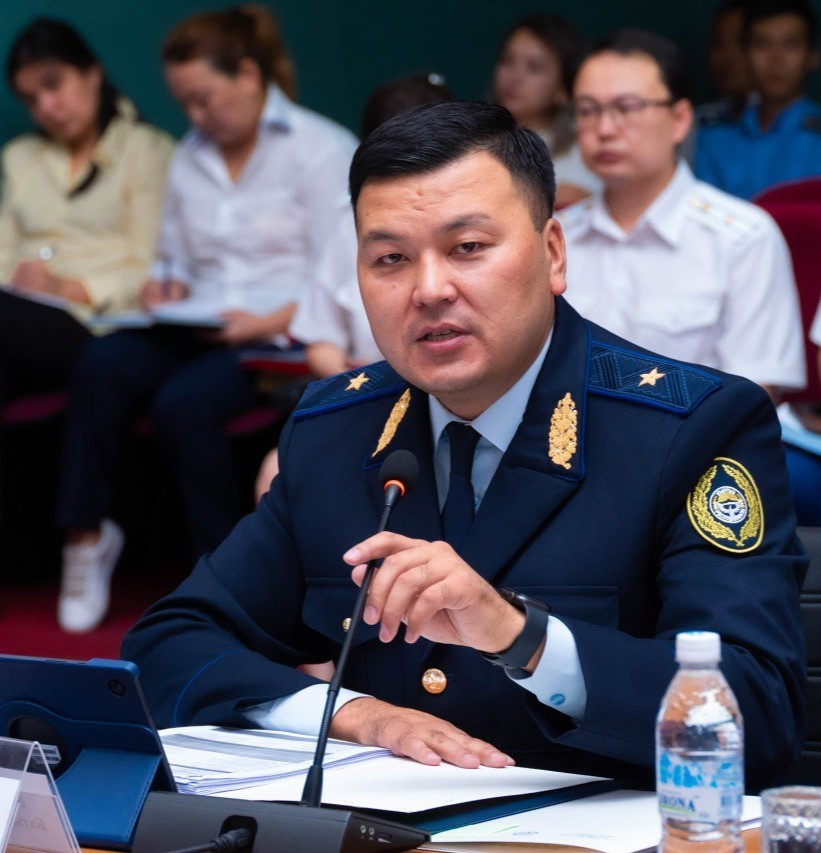
- Baetov in 2024

Minister of Justice
- Incumbent
- Assumed office 13 October 2021
- President: Sadyr Japarov
- Preceded by: Asel Chynbaeva

Personal details
- Born: 20 December 1984 (age 41) Frunze, Kirghiz SSR, Soviet Union (now Bishkek, Kyrgyzstan)

Ayav Batyrkulovich Baetov (Kyrgyz: Аяз Батыркулович Баетов; born 20 December 1984) is a Kyrgyz lawyer and politician who has been serving as the Minister of Justice of Kyrgyzstan since October 2021 under President Sadyr Japarov. Prior to being appointed as minister, he worked as a professor in the Faculty of Law at various universities.

== Early life ==
Baetov was born on 20 December 1984 in Frunze, which was then part of the Kirghiz SSR in the Soviet Union. He was born the son of Batyrkul I. Baetov, who served for many years in civil service, such as being the Deputy Chairman of the State Committee on Tourism, Sports and Youth Policy for some time. In 2006, he graduated from the Faculty of Law Kyrgyz National University with a bachelor's degree. During his time at the university, he spent a year abroad as an exchange student at St. Petersburg State University in Russia. Later on, he received a Master's in Public Policy in 2011 from the National Graduate Institute for Policy Studies in Japan, became a Candidate of Legal Sciences from Kyrgyz National University in 2009, and finally became a Doctor of Legal Sciences in 2015 which was also from Kyrgyz National University.

== Career ==
While a student, he began working in 2005 when he became the National Coordinator of the Philip C. Jessup International Law Moot Court Competition and the executive director of the International Law School Community Foundation. Starting in September 2006, he worked as a lecturer and acting professor in the Faculty of Law at his alma mater, a position he held until July 2018, although he transitioned to part time starting in December 2016. He was then the 3rd secretary of the International Law Department at the Ministry of Foreign Affairs from 2011 to 2013. From 2013 to 2014 he was Head of the International Department of the Constitutional Chamber of the Supreme Court, and for two years afterward returned to being a lecturer. He taught at Kyrgyz National University and the American University of Central Asia in diplomatic law.

Afterwards, from 2016 to 2018 he was the vice-president of the International University of Kyrgyzstan, and then for a year afterward served as the Director of the Center for Judicial Representation. Prior to becoming minister, from 2020 to 2021, he was the Country Director for Uzbekistan of the American Bar Association's Legal Program ABA ROLI. In 2020, he ran in the 2020 Kyrgyz parliamentary election representing the Respublika party. He ran for seat 14. During his campaign, he advocated for legal reform, mainly by abolishing the dependence of judges on the government. However, he was not elected, with the party failing to obtain any seats.

He was appointed Minister of Justice in October 2021 by President Sadyr Japarov. As Minister of Justice, he has overseen the Centerra Gold case in New York. The case is regarding Centerra Gold initiating arbitration proceedings against the government after the government signed a bill allowing for temporary control over the Kumtor Gold Mine, despite Centerra owning and operating the mine. In 2022, he testified in a New York Court on behalf of the government. After legal proceedings, in April it was announced that the government would take full control of the mine under an out-of-court settlement with Centerra. He was also noted for his actions during the dispute over the Andijan Reservoir with Uzbekistan during the subsequent protests after the government ceded control of the reservoir in exchange for agricultural land in Uzbekistan without giving full details of the border deal. Specifically, Baetov suspended the licenses of the lawyers of the protestors, such as Erkin Bulekbaev and Akin Toktaliev, which was seen as political pressure. In May 2025, the government announced plans to radically reform and cut the bureacuracy, which Baetov was appointed to do, in a manner he noted would be similar to Elon Musk's actions with DOGE.
