= Edil Baisalov =

Kyrgyz politician (born 1977)

- Эдиль Байсалов
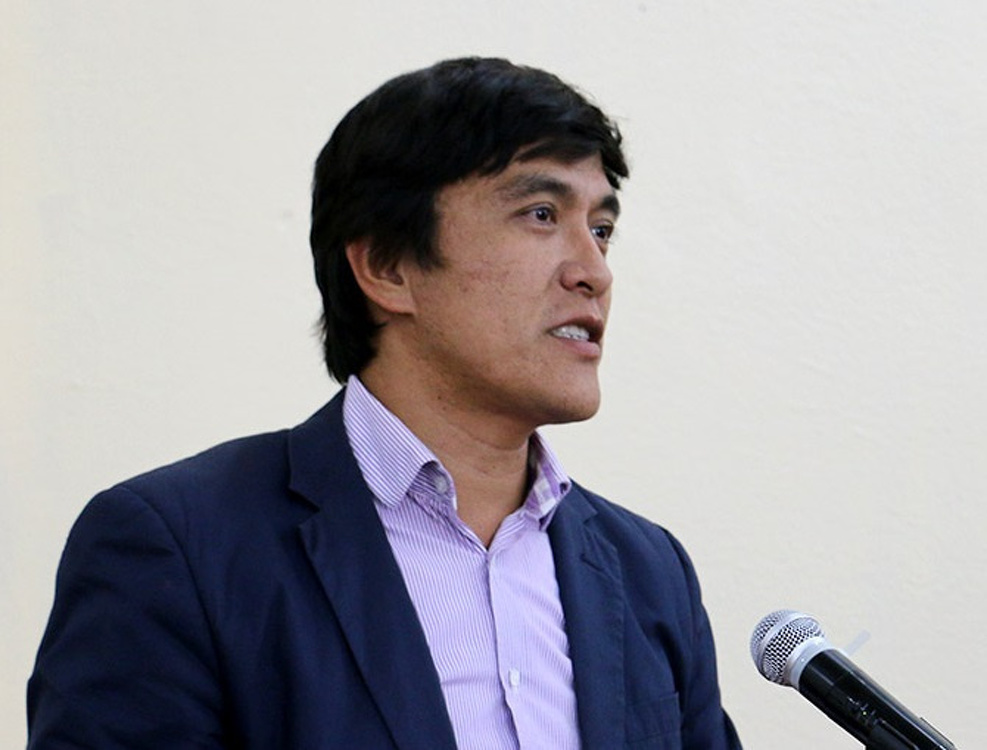
- Baisalov in 2017

Deputy Chairman of the Cabinet of Ministers of Kyrgyzstan
- Incumbent
- Assumed office 16 October 2020
- President: Sadyr Japarov

Personal details
- Born: 6 August 1977 (age 49) Bishkek, Kyrgyzstan

Edil Baisalov (Russian: Эдиль Байсалов; born 6 August 1977) is a Kyrgyz politician, who currently serves as the Deputy prime minister in the Cabinet of Ministers of Kyrgyzstan. He participated in the Tulip Revolution of 2005 and following the 2010 Kyrgyzstani uprising, briefly served as Chief of Staff of the interim government led by Roza Otunbayeva. Known in Kyrgyzstan as the "Great Justifier" and the main advocate of Kyrgyz authorities.

== Early life and Political career (2003-2007) ==
=== Early life ===
He was born on August 6, 1977, in Bishkek and grew up in Naryn. He studied in Turkey (1992–1993) and the United States (1994–1995) as an exchange student. He attended the American University of Central Asia and the Kyrgyz State National University.

=== Political career (2003-2007) ===
In February 2003, the Kyrgyz government forcibly hospitalized Baisalov, preventing him from attending an NGO meeting.

Baisalov played a leading role in the Tulip Revolution of March 24, 2005.

Baisalov has campaigned against crime and corruption. On April 12, 2006, he survived an attempted assassination for his vocal criticism of President Kurmanbek Bakiyev's failure to battle organized crime.

In July 2006 he was the recipient of the American Bar Association's international rule of law award presented by the US Supreme Court Justice Ruth Bader Ginsburg with the following citation:

"Edil Baisalov, President of the Coalition of NGOs for Democracy and Civil Society, Kyrgyzstan. Steadfast human rights advocate, he has promoted reform efforts designed to advance democracy and abate corruption in his country. He has persisted in doing so despite threats to, and even a violent assault on, his very life".

In November 2006, Baisalov was involved in large anti-government demonstrations in Bishkek, acting as a spokesman for protesters. Shortly afterwards, Baisalov was again attacked in the Osh airport.

In August 2007 Baisalov joined the Social Democratic Party of Kyrgyzstan, chaired by then prime-minister Almazbek Atambaev. He played an important role in consolidating democratic opposition to President Kurmanbek Bakiev. In 1999-2007 Baisalov led the 'Coalition for Civil Society and Democracy', the largest Kyrgyz advocacy and election monitoring network.

However, after coming to power in 2020 and being appointed to the post of Deputy Prime Minister, Edil Baisalov completely changed his previous rhetoric, and began to be called the "great justifier" of the authorities. For instance, one of the consequences of it is that Kyrgyzstan dropped 50 positions in the freedom of speech ranking between 2020 and 2023, the biggest drop in the history of its independence, and massive arrests of political activists have started.

=== Escape from Kyrgyzstan ===
On December 4, 2007, Edil Baisalov was removed by the Central Election Commission of Kyrgyzstan from the candidates list of the Social Democratic Party of Kyrgyzstan and barred from participating in the 2007 parliamentary elections. Some activists and lawyers claimed this decision to be politically motivated and illegal. It was alleged that Baisalov published the ballot on his blog and the General Prosecutor charged him with attempt to undermine integrity of elections.

As a member of the Central Commission for Elections and Referenda, Edil Baisalov illegally published a photo of an election ballot. In response, the CEC decided to destroy all printed ballots (2.7 million copies). According to the CEC and the Prosecutor General's Office, Baisalov caused damage to the state in excess of 11 million soms ($325,000) and obstructed the work of the Central Election Commission, creating conditions for the disruption of parliamentary elections.

In 2007, Baisalov, having received legal assistance from the NGO "Adilet" clinics, "tearfully asked for legal aid in connection with the criminal case initiated against him" and was forced to flee the country. Baisalov claimed that he was a victim of political vendetta and left Kyrgyzstan on December 8, 2007, for Kazakhstan and was resettled with his family in Sweden by UNHCR.

== Political career (2010-present) ==
In 2012-2013, Baisalov served as acting Minister for Social Development, and later as deputy Minister for Social Development, with the responsibility for children, elderly and the disabled. His refusal to declare a moratorium on the international adoptions attracted controversy.

On May 28, 2019, the Foreign Affairs Committee of the Jogorku Kenesh approved and nominated Baisalov as Ambassador to the United Kingdom. His nomination was approved by President Sooronbay Jeenbekov on June 11, 2019. Edil Baisalov presented his credentials to Queen Elizabeth II on November 21, 2019, formally becoming Ambassador.

=== Deputy Prime Minister (2020-present) ===
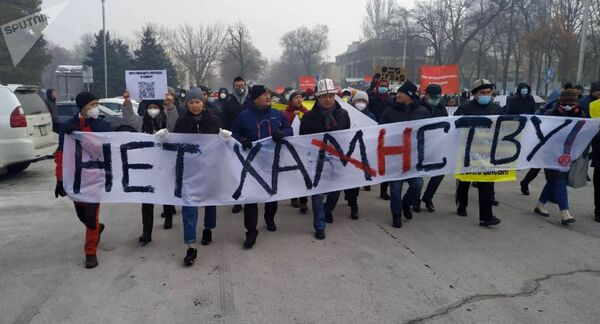
Protest against the establishment of a super-presidential system - "the Khan Constitution"

As Deputy Prime Minister in the Cabinet of Ministers from 2020, Edil Baisalov became one of the apologists and advocates of Sadyr Japarov's power. Baisalov's biography seems to have split into two parts - before and after coming to power, and he himself earned the title "power's attorney". Moreover, the media began to compare Baisalov's statements before and after coming to power.

Despite assurances from deputies that the establishment of a presidential system could lead to Asian despotism, Edil Baisalov directly supported the establishment of a super presidential constitution in Kyrgyzstan, opposing his former colleagues in the non-governmental sector. In particular, during debates on Radio "Liberty", he openly spoke out against the parliamentary system of government:

"We don't care about the opinion of all 90 deputies now. We will not chase after each deputy, we will work with 45 or 50 deputies. They will pass our laws. The rest [of the deputies], I will say, even if they object and stamp their feet, it will not bother us [Cabinet]. You will not be able to distract us. We will not wait for your approval."

Kyrgyzstan dropped 50 positions in the freedom of speech ranking between 2022 and 2023, the biggest drop in the history of its independence.

== Russian NGO Law ==
In 2024, Kyrgyzstan also adopted a new law on foreign agents, which completely copies a similar Russian law.

Despite being a member of the NGO community himself, Baisalov openly stated that "many NGOs exist for blanket accusations and defamation of power".

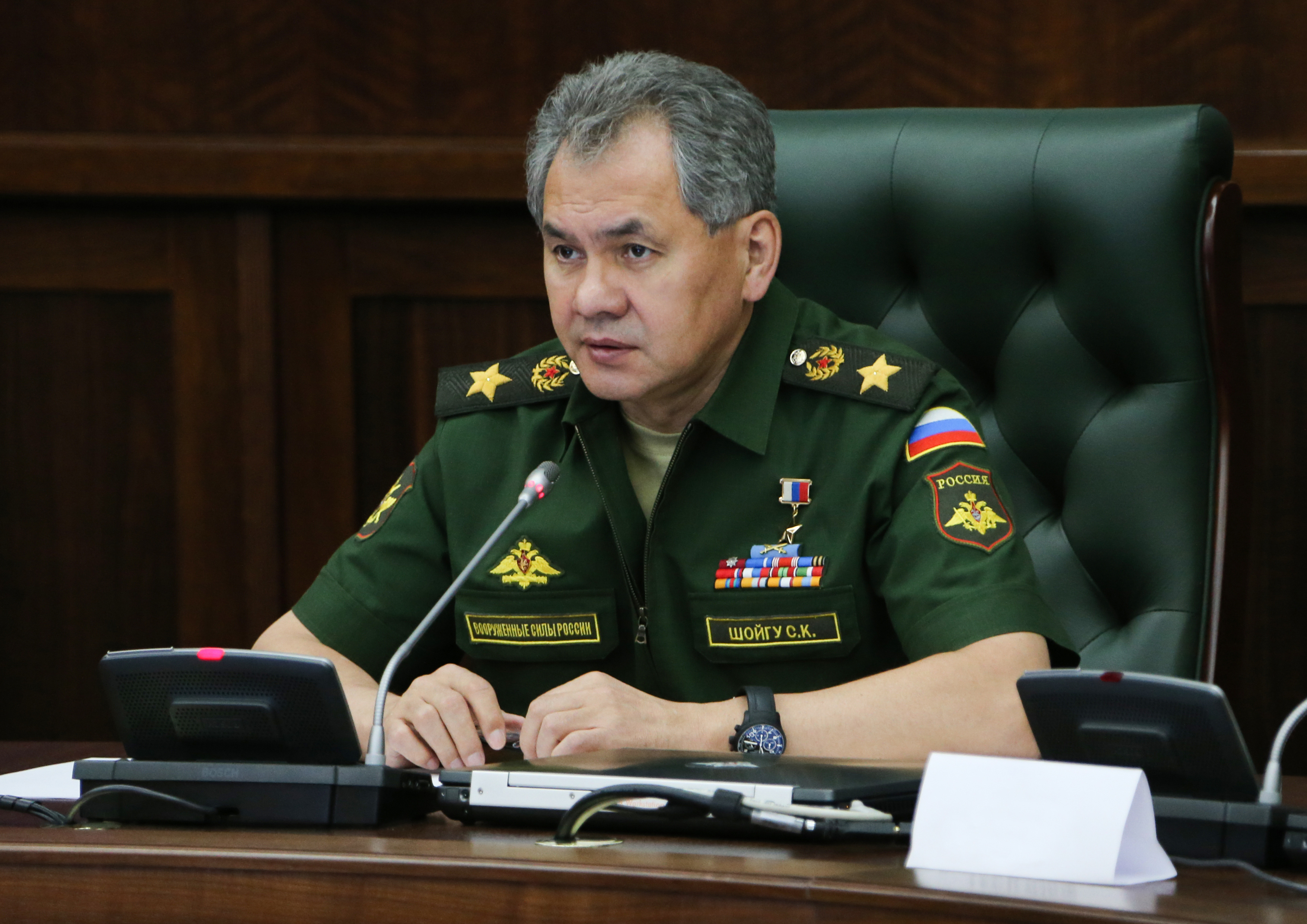
Sergei Shoigu commented on the immediate need to adopt a law on NGOs in Central Asia

Prior to the adoption of this law, Russian Defense Minister Sergei Shoigu made statements about the potential danger posed by foreign NGOs in Kyrgyzstan.

Baisalov became the main driver in promoting this law: "The time has come to put an end to the uncontrolled financing of our civil and public organizations by any external forces." The heads of human rights organizations reminded Baisalov that at one time, during the period of persecution by the authorities, he himself "cried and asked for support" from NGOs.

Baisalov stated: "Gone are the days of the naïve romantic age of Kyrgyzstan. In the 90s, we all thought that everyone wanted our country to prosper and would help us and do everything for us. It turned out that this was not the case. No one will do our work for us. Whether he's good or bad, we'll see him in action."

The law gives prosecutors the power to extrajudicially declare foreign and international organizations "undesirable" in Kyrgyzstan and shut them down. Organizations are subject to heavy fines and lengthy prison sentences if they fail to dissolve when given notice to do so.

== Charges Against Journalists and Political Activists ==
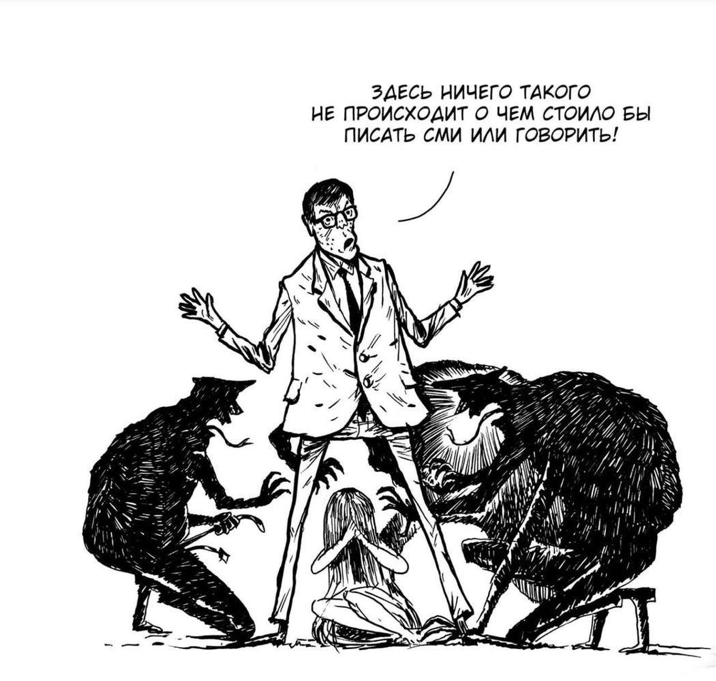
Caricature of Baisalov from the human rights community

Baisalov frequently defends authorities in cases of regular corruption scandals. After an anti-corruption investigation revealed the direct involvement of the family of GKNB head Kamchybek Tashiev, a colleague of Baisalov as vice-prime-minister, in fuel supplies and nepotism in the energy sector, Vice Prime Minister Edil Baisalov came to his defense. After this story, three criminal cases were initiated against the investigative journalist. Later, the journalist conducting the investigation was deprived of his passport and expelled to Russia. This case was condemned by the international community. Baisalov urged not to shed tears over the deportation of the journalist from the country.

In February 2022, the authorities of Kyrgyzstan conducted mass arrests of political activists, with whom Baisalov had been publicly arguing as a defender on the part of the authorities. Later, Baisalov stated,

"On issues of the border, everyone should be silent. Such are the laws of democracy. Everything will be decided by legitimately elected national authorities. Not the crowd. Not bloggers. And especially not “shot down pilots” of retired politicians and losers."

The arrests were condemned by human rights organizations such as Human Rights Watch, the Helsinki Group, and others. Activists stated that they were intimidated at meetings with authorities on border issues. Most of the nearly 30 arrested people are still in detention.

One of the political activists was arrested after showing the middle finger to Baisalov during a parliamentary discussion on the introduction of troops into Kazakhstan during a period of instability in 2022.

== Pressure on the Media community ==
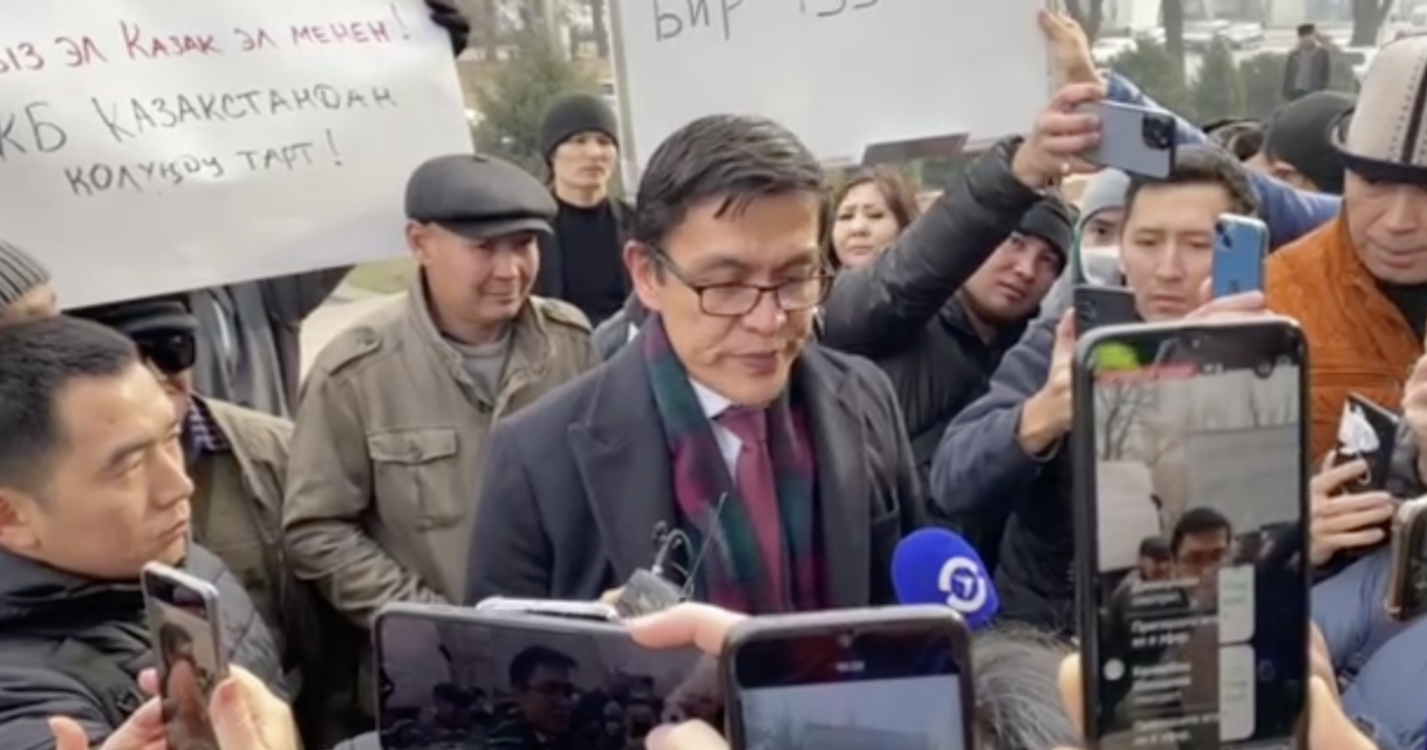
Edil Baisalov called for a ban on civil society meetings near the White House “for the safety of deputies”

Edil Baisalov made accusations against the media in July 2022, after the publication of news about violence against a 13-year-old girl by law enforcement agencies and harassment by society, which caused a lot of outrage from the media. In late February 2022, it became known that a 13-year-old girl had been raped in Bishkek for five months. Later, three men were convicted in this case - two police officers and a market loader. When journalists commented on this news, Edil Baisalov entered into a discussion with journalists and criticized them for spreading negative news. ("Why write further and multiply pain?") Baisalov issued a statement to the media demanding not to publish negative news, but only good news, after which he received the nickname "Great Justifier":

Why write and further multiply the pain?... But I believe that due to the editorial policy of two or three media outlets, our population is simply exposed to negative information...

During pro-government rallies aimed at shutting down independent media outlets - Kloop, Azattyk, and Kaktus Media, with threats to set media publications on fire, Edil Baisalov supported the law on foreign agents and called for a struggle against the media:

"At a time when the country and the state need to close ranks in the face of external challenges, there are all sorts of instigators and provocateurs, 'fifth columnists', panic-mongers and defeatists, with whom conversation should be brief in general".

In December, the journalists from Temirov Live reported that Akylbek Japarov flew to Japan on a private business jet, costing the budget 10 million soms. Investigators wondered why spend on a private plane flight when the entire Cabinet has to economize due to the forecasted record budget deficit of 35 billion soms.

"The stratosphere is where we are moving the country despite the active resistance of your dear editorial office and the sabotage by the marginally-backward.",

- stated the Deputy Prime Minister Edil Baisalov. Kyrgyzstan dropped 50 positions in the freedom of speech ranking between 2022 and 2023, the biggest drop in the history of its independence.

== Quotes ==
- "Support the president and submit to the state!"
- "At a time when the country and the state need to close ranks in the face of external challenges, there are all sorts of instigators and provocateurs, 'fifth columnists', panic-mongers and defeatists, with whom conversation should be brief in general."
- "We don't care about the opinion of all 90 deputies now. We will not chase after each deputy, we will work with 45 or 50 deputies. They will pass our laws. The rest [of the deputies], I will say, even if they object and stamp their feet, it will not bother us [Cabinet]. You will not be able to distract us. We will not wait for your approval."
- "The stratosphere is where we are moving the country despite the active resistance of your dear editorial office and the sabotage by the marginally-backward!"
- "Why write further and multiply pain?"
- "We should cherish our sovereignty. Central Asia is not anyone’s back yard."
- "We came out to the streets to demand that the government stop merging with organized crime. We demand law and order."
