= Osh State University =

Public university in Osh, Kyrgyzstan

Coordinates: 40°31′54″N 72°47′42″E

- Ош Мамлекеттик Университети (Kyrgyz); Ошский Государственный Университет (Russian)
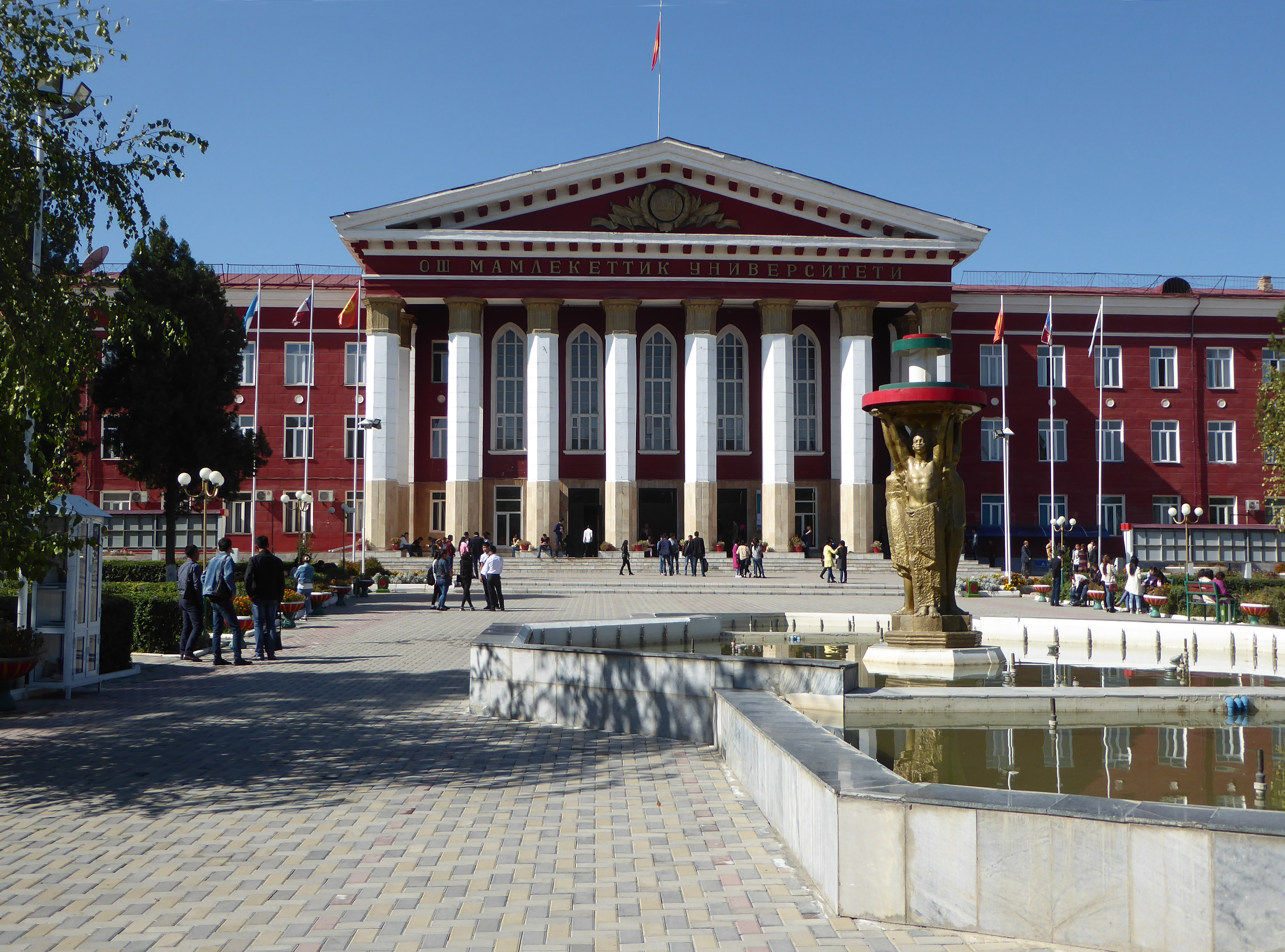
- Administrative Campus
- Other names: OshSU (English), OshMU (Kyrgyz), OshGU (Russian)
- Former names: Osh Teachers' Institute (1939-1951); Osh Pedagogical Institute (1951-1992)
- Type: Public
- Established: 1939
- Founders: Kirghiz Soviet Socialist Republic
- Students: 25,974 (2011)
- Location: 723500, Lenin Street 331, Osh, Osh Region, Kyrgyzstan
- Language: English, Russian, etc.
Colors
- Website: Osh State University

The Osh State University (Kyrgyz: Ош мамлекеттик университети, Russian: Ошский государственный университет, Uzbek: Osh davlat universiteti) is a public university in Osh, the second largest city in Kyrgyzstan. The university was originally established by the Kirghiz SSR in 1939 as a teacher training institute and was upgraded to a comprehensive pedagogical institute in 1951. The institute was awarded full university status in 1992 in the immediate aftermath of the dissolution of the Soviet Union.

Today, Osh State University is one of the leading universities of Kyrgyzstan and one important center of higher education outside of the capital city of Bishkek. The university enrolls around 40,000 students, with 3,000 of them being international students. Instruction is offered both in English and Russian.

Most of the foreign students study at the Medical Faculty. Other faculties include the Engineering Institute, the Business and Management Faculty, the Faculty of Law, the Pedagogical Faculty, the Faculty of Modern Languages, the Faculty of Mathematics, the Faculty of Computer Sciences and Electronics, and the Faculty of Arts.

== History ==
Osh State University traces its origins back to 1939 with the founding of higher education teacher training institute in the city. The institute was established to address the shortage of teachers in schools in southern Kyrgyzstan. The institute was established by the decision of the Kirghiz Soviet Socialist Republic, one of the constituent republics of the Soviet Union. Future teachers received 2 years of training which included courses in history and philology, physics, mathematics and natural sciences and geography.

On 24 May 1951 Council of Ministers of the USSR adopted decision No. 1759 followed by the Council of Ministers of the Kyrgyz SSR No. 511-193-1 on 26 June 1951 which upgraded the Osh Teachers' Institute to the Osh Pedagogical Institute. The new institute was reorganized into faculties of philology, physics and mathematics and foreign languages. For the purposes of the implementation of reform, authorities allocated 1 million roubles.

University rankings

Regional – Overall
- QS Asia: =260 (2025)

=== Rectors ===
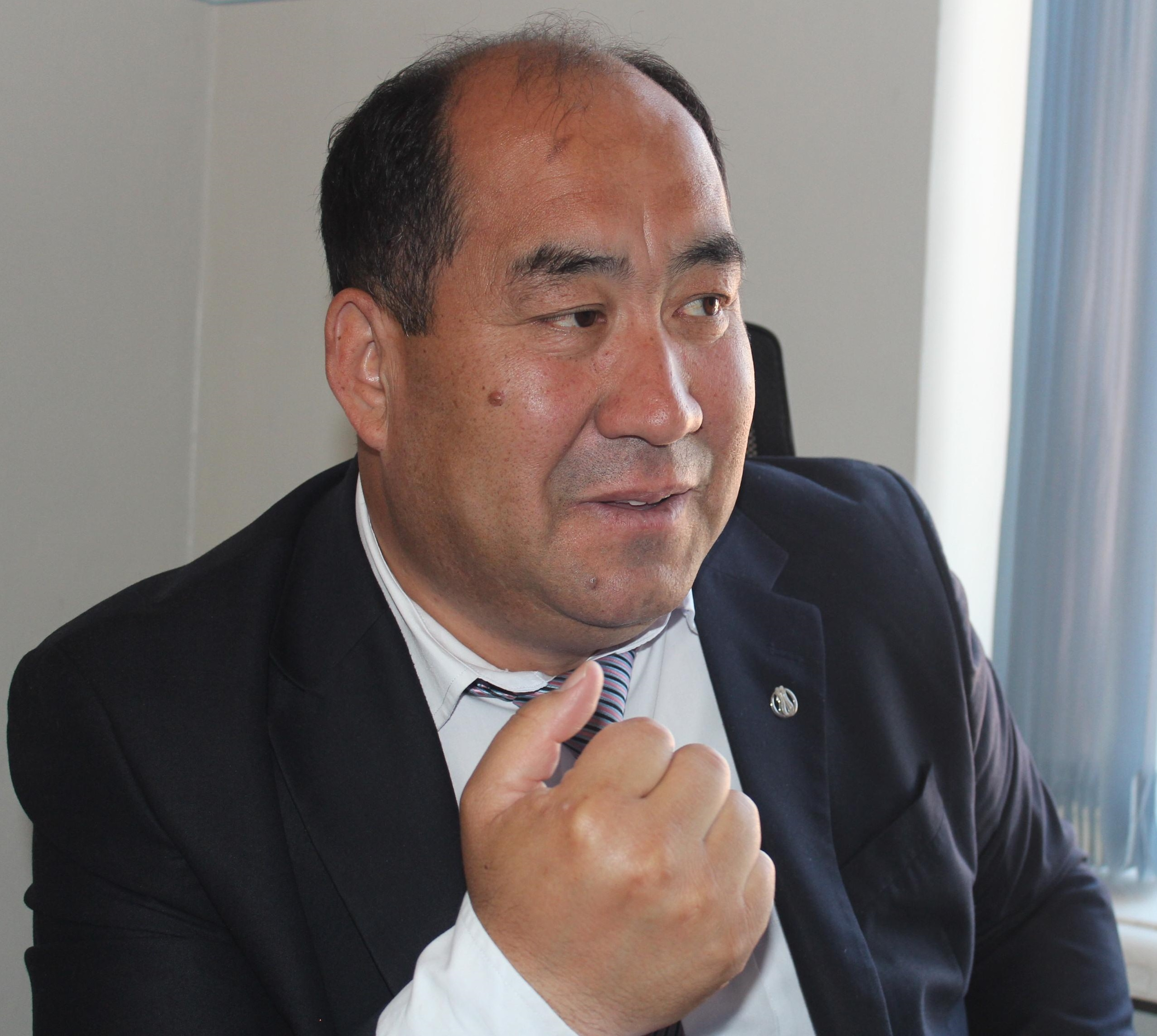
Kanybek Isakov

Order	Mandate	Name
1	1951–1953	Raimbek Tabaldiev - Табалдыев Раимбек (Kyrgyz)
2	1953–1955	Fedor Polovikov - Половиков Федор (Kyrgyz)
3	1955–1960	Ashimkan Omuraliev - Омуралиев Ашимкан (Kyrgyz)
4	1960–1965	Baki Eshmambetov - Ешмамбетов Баки (Kyrgyz)
5	1965–1967	Tashmurza Aitmurzaev - Айтмурзаев Ташмурза (Kyrgyz)
6	1967–1973	Mira Botbaeva - Ботбаева Мира (Kyrgyz)
7	1973–1977	Raimkul Kuluev - Кулуев Раимкул (Kyrgyz)
8	1977–1986	Sulaiman Zhumagulov - Жумагулов Сулайман (Kyrgyz)
9	1986–1992	Arap Anarbaev - Анарбаев Арап (Kyrgyz)
10	1992–1998	Bakyt Beshimov - Бешимов Бакыт (Kyrgyz)
11	1998–2005	Bektemir Murzubraimov - Мурзубраимов Бектемир (Kyrgyz)
12	2005–2011	Mukhtar Orozbekov - Орозбеков Мухтар (Kyrgyz)
13	2011–2019	Kanybek Isakov - Исаков Каныбек (Kyrgyz)
14	2019–	Kudayberdi Gaparalievich Kozhobekov
