= Ministry of Cybersecurity =

Government ministry of Kyrgyzstan

Ministry of Cybersecurity of the Kyrgyz Republic
- Кыргыз Республикасынын Кибер коопсуздук министрлиги Министерство кибербезопасности Республики Кыргызстан

Government Ministry overview
- Jurisdiction: Government of Kyrgyzstan
- Headquarters: Bishkek, Kyrgyz Republic
- Minister responsible: Sultan Barikov
- Government Ministry executive: Ramazan Janbekov, Deputy Minister
- Website: https://dpa.gov.kg/ky/

The Ministry of Cybersecurity of the Kyrgyz Republic is a ministry that is in charge of the cybersecurity of the Kyrgyz Republic.

The Ministry's core mission is to protect the nation's critical digital infrastructure, prevent cybercrime, and ensure the privacy of citizens' online activities. The Ministry is responsible for the implementation of policies and strategies that enhance cybersecurity awareness, develop the national cyber workforce, and respond to cyber incidents.

The Ministry is led by a Minister, appointed by the President of the Kyrgyz Republic, with a team of senior officials overseeing various departments. The leadership includes the Minister, supported by a deputy minister and specialized advisors, each focusing on specific areas such as cyber defense, legal aspects, international cooperation, and public outreach.
