= Kyrk Choro =

Kyrk Choro Кырк Чоро
- Leader: Zamirbek Kochorbaev
- Founded: 2010
- Ideology: Kyrgyz nationalism Ultranationalism; Ethnonationalism; Antifeminism; Anti-LGBT rights
- Political position: Far-right

Kyrk Choro (Kyrgyz: Кырк Чоро, IPA: [qɤ́ɾχ t͡ɕʰɔɾɔ́]), officially known as the Public Association Kyrgyz Choroloru, is a right-wing nationalist political party in Kyrgyzstan. The organisation's name translates to 'Forty Warriors', a reference to the forty knights and forty tribes of the hero Manas in the eponymous Epic of Manas; in the epic, Manas unites these tribes against the enemies of the Kyrgyz people. Leaders of the movement have claimed it has between 4700 and 5000 members. Among these are "many middle-class professionals, such as physicians, professors, and lawyers", who are typically middle-aged men. Officially, though, it is open to members aged from 25 to 40.

Kyrk Choro is an outspoken proponent of traditional moral codes and ethnic nationalism. In a 2015 manifesto, it demanded that foreigners only be allowed in hotels and called for the banning of Uyghurs from the largest clothing market in Bishkek. These nationalist beliefs are reflected in one of their most recognizable attributes, the traditional Kyrgyz white hat. The group also campaigned against the legalisation of same-sex marriage. Furthermore, Kyrk Choro has stated that it is "against the parliamentary form of government" and "against the existing election system".

The organisation has gained a degree of notoriety for its use of political violence. Freedom House described it in 2016 as an "ultranationalist vigilante group" that "enjoys official support from security agencies". Alongside other nationalist groups, it engages in protests and intimidations against political opponents and ethnic minorities, and it has assaulted employees of the human rights organisation "8/365". The group has also carried out raids on sex workers who provide services to foreigners. They are accused of intimidating and attacking feminist and LGBT activists on multiple occasions, allegedly in collaboration with Kyrgyz state authorities. More broadly, the rise of Kyrk Choro coincided with officially sanctioned pushbacks against LGBT rights (culminating in the 2023 anti-LGBT propaganda law) and with a new fatwa against homosexuality by the acting Grand Mufti.

Another example of the organisation's operating as a "state within the state" is the role it has taken upon itself in inspecting and reporting the presence of unregistered workers of Chinese origin in factories, mines and construction sites. Despite not having any official credentials to carry out these controls, the group has openly done so in cooperation with Kyrgyz law enforcement and government agencies, carrying out a joint inspection of businesses with the State Migration Service. Observers have noted that Kyrk Choro can occupy this position by exploiting broader anti-Chinese sentiment. China accounts for a large part of foreign direct investment in Kyrgyzstan, with many Chinese traders and businessmen present, and the country owes a substantial debt to China. Groups such as Kyrk Choro use these elements to claim that the government is "corrupt" and has "betrayed" ethnic Kyrgyz people, even though they themselves work in collusion with the government.
