= Cabinet of Ministers of the Kyrgyz Republic =

Government Executive Body

Cabinet of Ministers
- Ministrler Kabineti

Overview
- Established: 1991; 35 years ago
- State: Kyrgyzstan
- Leader: Chairman
- Appointed by: President
- Responsible to: President
- Headquarters: White House, Bishkek
- Website: Official website

The Cabinet of Ministers (Kyrgyz: Ministrler Kabineti) is an executive body presided by the Chairman of the Cabinet of Ministers of Kyrgyzstan. The status and provisions of the government are determined by Section V of the Constitution of Kyrgyzstan. The cabinet consists of the deputy chairmen, ministers and the chairmen of state committees.

== History ==
The Kyrgyzstan Parliament approved a smaller executive cabinet, consolidating several ministries and reducing their number from 22 to 16 on 3 February 2021; this was partially in response to the political unrest which swept the nation in October 2020. President Sadyr Japarov has stated he would like to see further reductions.

== Current Cabinet of Ministers ==
Below are the 17 members of the Cabinet of Ministers as of 2025:

Office	Photo	Name	Political affiliation	Assumed office
Chairman of the Cabinet of Ministers; Head of the Presidential Administration		Adylbek Kasymaliev	Independent	16 December 2024
Deputies
First Deputy Chairman		Daniyar Amangeldiev	Emgek	18 December 2024
Deputy Chairman		Edil Baisalov	Independent	13 October 2021
Deputy Chairman		Bakyt Torobayev	Ata-Jurt Kyrgyzstan	30 March 2022
Deputy Chairman; Chairman of the State Committee for National Security		Kamchybek Tashiev	Independent	13 October 2021
Ministers
Minister of Foreign Affairs		Jeenbek Kulubayev	Independent	29 April 2022
Minister of Justice		Ayaz Baetov	Independent	13 October 2021
Minister of Defense		Baktybek Bekbolotov	Independent	6 September 2021
Minister of Finance		Almaz Baketaev	Independent	13 October 2021
Minister of Economy and Commerce		Bakyt Sydykov	Independent	13 October 2021
Minister of Internal Affairs		Ulan Niyazbekov	Independent	14 October 2020
Minister of Labour, Social Security and Migration		Ravshanbek Sabirov	Ata-Jurt Kyrgyzstan	9 December 2024
Minister of Education and Science		Dogdurkul Kendirbaeva	Independent	5 May 2021
Minister of Health		Checheybayev Erkin Maratovich	Independent	5 February 2025
Minister of Transport and Communications		Absattar Syrgabaev	Independent	11 July 2024
Minister of Energy		Taalaibek Ibraev	Independent	14 September 2022
Minister for Water Resources, Agriculture and Processing Industry		Bakyt Torobayev	Ata-Jurt Kyrgyzstan	25 December 2023
Minister of Emergency Situations		Boobek Ajikeev	Independent	14 October 2020
Ministry of Culture, Information, Sports and Youth Policy		Altynbek Maksutov	Independent	3 October 2022
Ministry of Natural Resources, Environment and Technical Supervision		Meder Mashiev	Independent	2 September 2024
Ministry of Cybersecurity		Sultan Barikov	Independent	27 October 2024
Ministry of Digital Development		Nuria Kutnaeva	Independent	13 September 2023
