= Bakyt Beshimov =

Kyrgyz politician

Baktybek Beshimov Бактыбек Бешимов
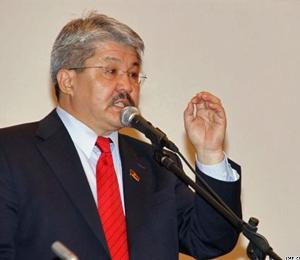
- Beshimov in 2008

Member of Parliament, Head of Social Democratic Party and opposition factions
- In office 2005–2009

Ambassador of Kyrgyzstan to India, Nepal, Sri Lanka and Bangladesh
- In office March 2002 – June 2005
- Preceded by: Osmonakun Ibraimov
- Succeeded by: Irina Orolbaeva

Member of Parliament
- In office 1999–2002

Personal details
- Born: 1954 (age 71–72) Bishkek, Soviet Union (now Kyrgyzstan)
- Party: Social Democratic Party
- Education: Kyrgyz National University
- Awards: 2019 Excellence in Teaching Award by Northeastern University

Bakyt Beshimov (Russian: Бактыбек Жолчубекович Бешимов; born 1954) is a leader of parliamentary fraction and deputy chairman of Social Democratic Party of Kyrgyzstan. Bakyt Beshimov is a prominent opposition leader, famous for his liberal views, and speaking out against Kurmanbek Bakiyev's and Askar Akayev's regimes.

== Early life ==
Bakyt Beshimov grew up in the south of Kyrgyzstan, spending most of his childhood in Osh. Graduating from the Lomonosov School, he attended Kyrgyz State National University where he earned a PhD in history in 1977.

Bakyt Beshimov was born into a family of teachers. His father was a professor at Osh State University. In fact, Bakyt Beshimov converted Osh State University into a full-fledged university from its prior status as a regional pedagogical institute

== Personal life ==
Bakyt Beshimov is married with two children. His both sons attended Harvard University. His son, Erdin Beshimov, is an educator at the Massachusetts Institute of Technology.

Bakyt Beshimov lives in the Boston area.

== Academic career ==
Beshimov started his career on the faculty as professor at Kyrgyz State National University. In 1991 he was appointed as the president of Osh State University, becoming the youngest president of a university in Kyrgyzstan. From 2006 to 2008 Beshimov served as a vice-president and provost of American University of Central Asia.

Beshimov also served as a national coordinator of UNDP "Life" Program, national manager of the UN Ferghana Valley Project, and regional expert at the Aga Khan Foundation.

Presently, Beshimov is a visiting scholar at the Massachusetts Institute of Technology Center for International Studies and Harvard University's Davis Center for Russian and Eurasian Studies. Beshimov is also a visiting professor at Suffolk University. In addition to appointments at MIT, Harvard and Suffolk, Beshimov is Professor of the Practice at Northeastern University in the Global Studies & International Relations program offered by the College of Professional Studies.

In 2019 Northeastern University awarded Beshimov Excellence in Teaching Award.

Bakyt Beshimov continues to be outspoken on world events.

== Political career ==
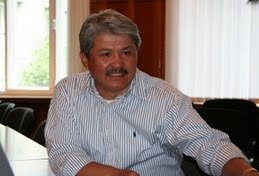

While serving as president of Osh State University, Beshimov became increasingly outspoken in his criticism towards then president Askar Akayev. Effective reforms of Osh State University gained him large popularity among the students. Students therefore protested, when Beshimov's political activity caused him to be fired. That same year Beshimov ran for a newly opened parliamentary spot from a district in Osh, and won a landslide victory. Beshimov became a prominent opposition leader. There were numerous attempts to assassinate and throw him in jail by the Akayev regime. Beshimov played a major role in negotiations with Askar Akayev on succeeding certain roles to the opposition. Under the agreement reached in the year 2000, Beshimov was appointed as Kyrgyzstan's ambassador to India with concurrent accreditation to Bangladesh, Nepal and Sri Lanka. Following the Tulip Revolution Beshimov returned to Kyrgyzstan to serve as vice-president of American University of Central Asia. Beshimov was a big supporter of and believer in the Tulip Revolution. After the new government followed short of promises made during the Tulip Revolution, and started reverting the course back to dictatorial rule, Beshimov re-engaged in politics, going into opposition against Kurmanbek Bakiyev. In December 2007 he was elected to Kyrgyzstan's Parliament, the Supreme Council, on the candidate list of the Social Democratic Party of Kyrgyzstan. He is the leader of the opposition fraction in the Kyrgyz Parliament.

Beshimov pushed forward policies to prevent other Shanghai Cooperation Organisation members from interfering with Kyrgyzstan's domestic issues. This angered some of Bakiev's own advisers.

Beshimov was one of the first politicians in Kyrgyzstan to use the web for engaging in conversation with the youth.

In the lead up to the 2010 Parliamentary elections Beshimov criticized the government for planning to close universities for the duration of the election, arguing that education is not a high priority for the government.

In 2009 Beshimov was granted political asylum in the US after surviving several assassination attempts due to him being a leader of the opposition.

== Manas air base ==
Bakyt Beshimov came under intense pressure for actively opposing the Kyrgyz government's initial decision to close a US air base, now the Transit Center at Manas. He was the only MP to vote for keeping the base open. Arguing for the importance of a US air base to the security in Central Asia created further divide between Beshimov and the "pro-Russian" government of Bakiyev.

== 2009 Kyrgyzstan presidential election ==
Beshimov was the campaign manager for the unified opposition candidate during the July 2009 presidential elections, which western observers deemed "fraudulent". Beshimov said that exit polls by opposition supporters showed Almazbek Atambayev won around 60 percent of the vote. Eventually, he was placed under state surveillance during the Bakiyev regime with intention to kill him.

Beshimov recently spoke against Bakiyev's appointment of his own son as head the Central Agency for Development, Investment, and Innovation. For his views several assassination plots have been made on Beshimov, allegedly organized by Bakiyev.

In 2009 Beshimov filed a suit with the Constitutional Court of Kyrgyzstan against Bakiyev. The basis for the suit was the claim that Bakiyev broke the law by being an active member of the Ak Jol political party The Court rejected the claim.

Several assassination attempts before the election, and escalation of threats after the election, forced Beshimov to leave Kyrgyzstan.

== 2010 revolution and Kyrgyz-Uzbek conflict ==
After the April 7 revolution in Kyrgyzstan, Beshimov was offered the position of ambassador of Kyrgyzstan to the United States, which he turned down.

Beshimov actively advocated that the 2010 South Kyrgyzstan ethnic clashes were provoked from outside Kyrgyzstan. He testified before Helsinki Commission on 27 July 2010 with this view.
