= Kanybek Isakov =

Kyrgyz politician and academic (1969–2020)

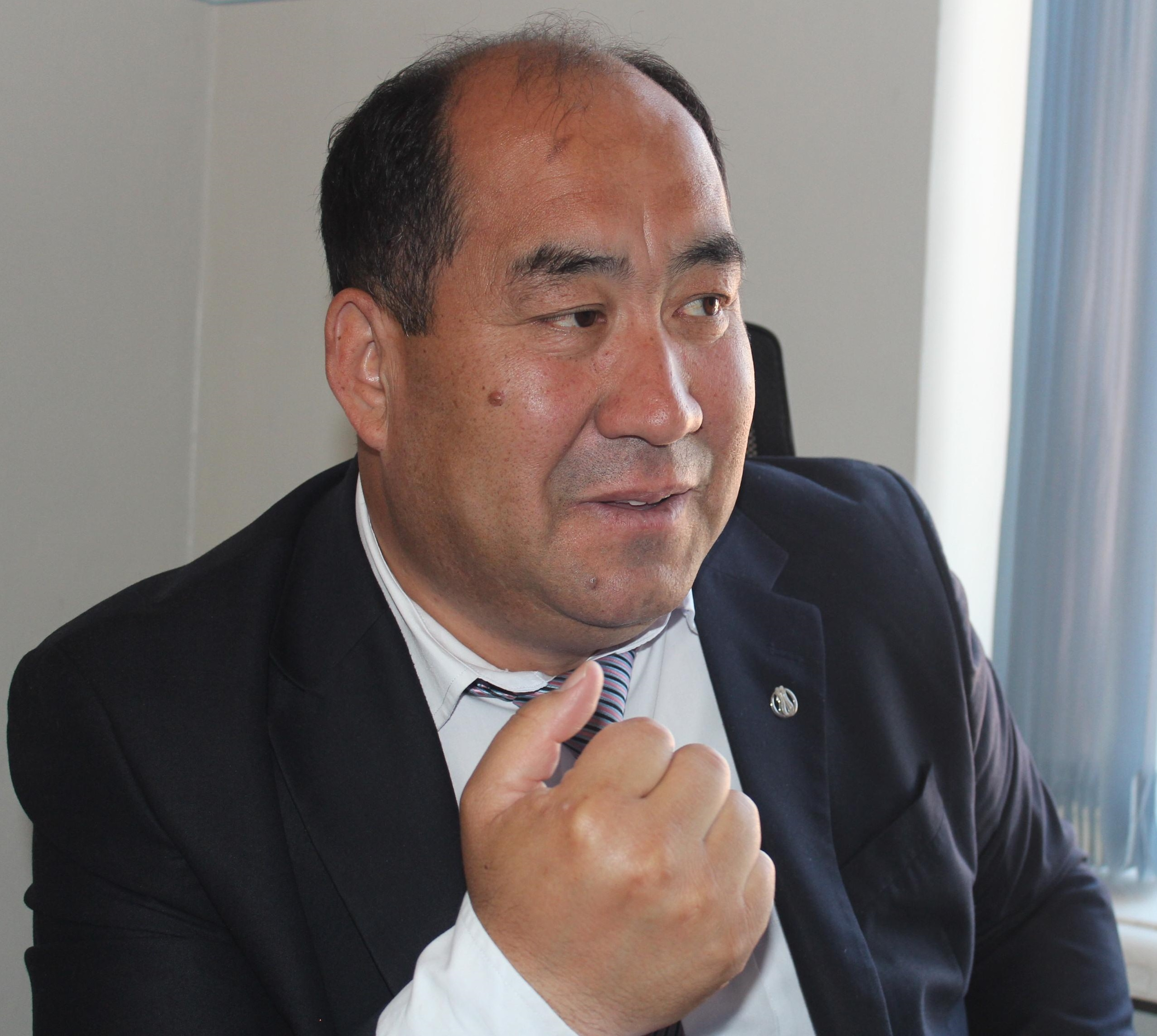
- Isakov in 2013

Kyrgyz Minister of Education and Science
- In office 11 September 2019 – 14 October 2020
- Preceded by: Gulmira Kudaiberdiyeva
- Succeeded by: Almazbek Beichenaliev

Rector of Osh State University
- In office 2011–2019

Personal details
- Born: 4 June 1969 Jangy-Nookat, Kirghiz SSR
- Died: 12 November 2020 (aged 51) Bishkek, Kyrgyzstan
- Party: SDPK

Kanybek Abdouvassitovitch Isakov (Kyrgyz: Каныбек Абдуваситович Исаков, 4 June 1969 – 12 November 2020) was a Kyrgyz politician and academic.

== Biography ==
Isakov became a professor of philology at Osh State University in 1993. He spent a large portion of his career ascending in the ranks within the university. He became Rector of the university in 2011, serving until 2019, when he was appointed Minister of Education and Science of Kyrgyzstan. During his educational career, he also served as Editor-in-Chief of the newspaper Nur.

Isakov began his political career as a member of the town council of Osh as a member of the Social Democratic Party of Kyrgyzstan. He became Minister of Education and Science on 11 September 2019 following the resignation of Gulmira Kudaiberdiyeva. During his tenure, he introduced a program which sought to produce better quality textbooks in the Kyrgyz language. During the 2020 Kyrgyzstani protests, Prime Minister Kubatbek Boronov's cabinet was sacked. Although it was initially announced that ministers would remain in place, the Japarov administration formed a completely different staff. Almazbek Beichenaliev replaced Isakov.

Kanybek Isakov died in Bishkek on 12 November 2020, at the age of 51, after contracting COVID-19.
