= Ministry of Education and Science (Kyrgyzstan) =

Government ministry of Kyrgyzstan

- Кыргыз Республикасынын Билим берүү жана илим министрлиги (Kyrgyz); Министерство образования и науки Киргизской Республики (Russian)
- Ministry of Education and Science Logo

- Cabinet of Ministers of the Kyrgyz Republic

Agency overview
- Formed: 1927 (as People's Commissariat of Education of the Kyrgyz ASSR)
- Jurisdiction: Cabinet of Ministers of the Kyrgyz Republic
- Headquarters: Bishkek, Kyrgyzstan
- Agency executive: Dogdurkul Kendirbaeva, Minister
- Website: Official website

The Ministry of Education and Science (Kyrgyz: Кыргыз Республикасынын Билим берүү жана илим министрлиги, romanized: Kyrgyz Respublikasynyn Bilim berüü jana ilim ministrligi, Russian: Министерство образования и науки Киргизской Республики, romanized: Ministerstvo obrazovaniya i nauki Kirgizskoy Respubliki) of Kyrgyzstan is the ministry of the Cabinet of Ministers of the Kyrgyz Republic charged with regulating and promoting the educational and scientific work in the country. The ministry is the main governmental authority overseeing the quality of education, the acquisition of knowledge by students, and the development of a comprehensive national education system. As the direct successor of the People's Commissariat of Education of the Kirghiz Autonomous Socialist Soviet Republic, established in 1927, the ministry is one of the oldest state institutions of Kyrgyzstan.

== History ==
=== Soviet period ===
Between 1927 and 1930, Kyrgyz linguist, politician and poet Kasym Tynystanov served as the first Commissar of Education of the Kirghiz Autonomous Socialist Soviet Republic and head of the committee for the creation of the new Kyrgyz Alphabet during the period of latinisation in the Soviet Union. At the time, wider project of national delimitation in the Soviet Union led to the promotion of the establishment of modern state institutions and the local system of education in national written languages in Soviet Central Asia.

=== Since independence ===
When Kyrgyzstan declared its independence on 31 August 1991 at the time of the dissolution of the Soviet Union, the newly independent state introduced its first new Education Law of the Kyrgyz Republic on 16 December 1992. The new law tasked the ministry with the responsibility to form and supervise the education policy of the country.

In 2009 the ministry introduced Bologna Process reform which in subsequent years led all public universities in the country to introduce standardized and internationally comparable division of educational qualifications into bachelor's and master's degree structure and a credit-hour based system. In 2012 the country introduced Education Development Strategy 2020 with the ambition to reform the overall management and to rationalise the financing of the education sector in the country.

== See also ==
- Education in Kyrgyzstan
- Science and technology in Kyrgyzstan
