= State Migration Service (Kyrgyzstan) =

- Мамлекеттик миграция кызматы (Kyrgyz); Государственная служба миграции (Russian)

Public Service overview
- Formed: 11 December 2015; 9 years ago
- Preceding Public Service: Ministry of Labor, Migration and Youth
- Jurisdiction: Government of Kyrgyzstan
- Headquarters: Bishkek, st. Moskovskaya # 194, Kyrgyz Republic
- Public Service executive: Kaymazarov Tashtanbek, Chairman
- Website: http://ssm.gov.kg/en/

The State Migration Service of the Government of the Kyrgyz Republic (Kyrgyz: Кыргыз Республикасынын Өкмөтүнө караштуу Мамлекеттик миграция кызматы; Russian: Государственная служба миграции при Правительстве Кыргызской Республики) is a governmental organization implementing state policy for migration in Kyrgyzstan. Kaymazarov Tashtanbek Turarovich was appointed, starting from 21 October 2020, to become the current Chairman of the State Migration Service.

== History ==
The service started to function in accordance with the Resolution of the Government of the Kyrgyz Republic No. 854 as of December 11, 2015, “On the Issues of the State Migration Service under the Government of the Kyrgyz Republic”. On December 12, 2016, by Decree No. 653 of the Government of the Kyrgyz Republic, there have been some changes to the functions of the Service.

== Structure ==
The agency is headed by the Chief of the Service. He has an adviser, an assistant, a commissioner for the prevention of corruption, and a press secretary. The Service has the following departments and employment numbers:

- Personnel and Document Management Department (5 persons)
- Legal Support and International Cooperation Department (5 persons)
- Financial and Technical Support Department (4 persons)
- Department of Labor Migration of Citizens Abroad (6 persons)
- Department for the Development of Migration policy (5 persons)
- Department for Working with Kairylmans
- Department for Working with Foreign Citizens (6 persons)
- Department for Working with Refugees (4 persons)
