= Daniyar Amangeldiev =

Kyrgyz economist and politician

- Данияр Амангелдиев

First Deputy Chairman, Cabinet of Ministers of the Kyrgyz Republic
- Incumbent
- Assumed office 18 December 2024
- President: Sadyr Japarov
- Prime Minister: Akylbek Japarov
- Preceded by: Arzybek Kozhoshev

Minister of Economy and Commerce
- In office 13 October 2021 – 16 December 2024
- Preceded by: Akylbek Japarov
- Succeeded by: Bakyt Sydykov

Deputy Minister of Economy and Finance
- In office 17 August 2021 – 13 October 2021

Mayor of Tokmok
- In office 2018–2020

Personal details
- Born: March 30, 1982 (age 44) Chüy Region, Kyrgyz SSR, Soviet Union
- Education: Kyrgyz National University
- Profession: Economist, civil servant, politician
- Awards: Honored Economist of the Kyrgyz Republic (2024)

Daniyar Joldoshevich Amangeldiev (born March 30, 1982) (Kyrgyz: Данияр Жолдошевич Амангелдиев, Russian: Данияр Жолдошевич Амангельдиев), is a Kyrgyz economist and politician. Amangeldiev was born in Chüy Region, Kyrgyz SSR. He graduated in 2003 from the Kyrgyz National University with a degree in accounting and auditing. In 2024, he was named Honored Economist of the Kyrgyz Republic.

== Career ==
He began his career in 2003 as an intern in the Ministry of Finance and later served in various economic and diplomatic roles. From 2007 to 2012, he worked at the Kyrgyz Trade Representation in the Russian Federation, eventually serving as acting deputy head. In 2013, he was appointed head of the Public Sector Expenditure Planning Department at the Ministry of Finance.

From 2018 to 2020, he served as the mayor of Tokmok. In August 2021, Amangeldiev was appointed Deputy Minister of Economy and Finance, and in October 2021 he was promoted to Minister of Economy and Commerce. In December 2024, he became the First Deputy Chairman of the Cabinet of Ministers.

As Minister of Economy, Amangeldiev prioritized shrinking the shadow economy, improving fiscal transparency, and encouraging innovation. He supported initiatives related to intellectual property rights, and sought to expand Kyrgyzstan's scientific output. He also advocated for deeper regional economic cooperation through the Eurasian Economic Union and bilateral partnerships with Hungary, Japan, and other countries.
