= Ministry of Agriculture, Water Resources and Regional Development (Kyrgyzstan) =

Government ministry of Kyrgyzstan

Ministry of Agriculture, Forestry and Water Resources of the Kyrgyz Republic
- Кыргыз Республикасынын Айыл, Токой жана Суу чарба Министрлиги; Министерство Сельского, Лесного и Водного хозяйства Кыргызской Республики

Government Ministry overview
- Jurisdiction: Government of Kyrgyzstan
- Headquarters: Bishkek, Kyrgyz Republic
- Minister responsible: Askarbek Djanybekov
- Government Ministry executives: Azamat Mukashev, Deputy Minister; Ilich Marsbekov, Deputy Minister; Ulan Adamaliev, Adviser to the Minister
- Website: https://www.agro.gov.kg

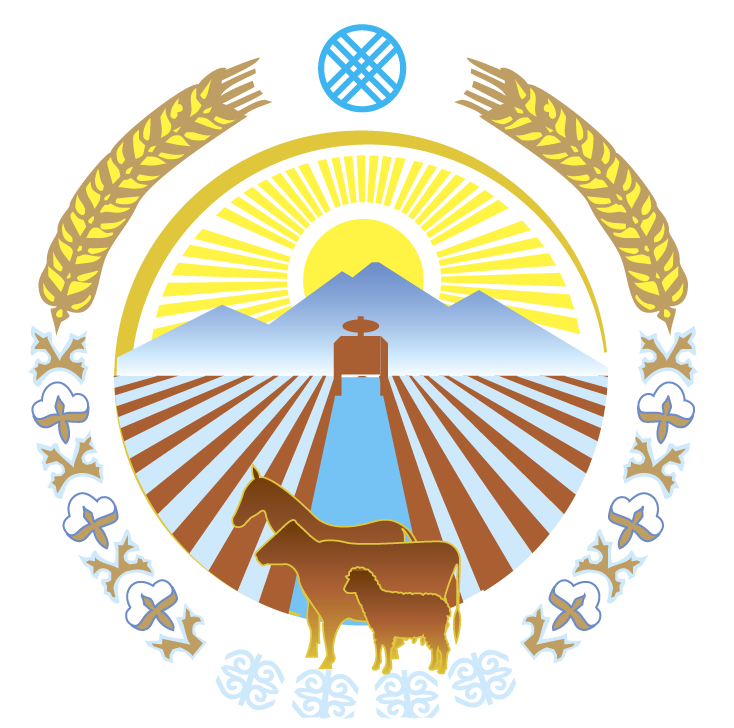
The emblem of the Ministry of Agriculture of the Kyrgyz Republic

The Ministry of Agriculture, Forestry and Water Resources of the Kyrgyz Republic (used to be: The Ministry of Agriculture, Food Industry and Melioration of the Kyrgyz Republic & The Ministry of Agriculture, Water Resources and Regional Development of the Kyrgyz Republic until being renamed in May 2021) is a ministry that is in charge of the agrarian and food situation of the Kyrgyz Republic. The ministry has its roots from the Soviet Union's Ministry of Agriculture and Food and Ministry of Food Industry, although both ministries did not directly preceded the current ministry.

The vast majority of the economy in rural Kyrgyz Republic is agricultural based, which includes crops cultivation and animal husbandry, thus the ministry is essential in ensuring sustained agricultural outputs and improved standards of living of citizens in these areas. The agriculture industry also contributes to approximately 15% of the republic's GDP, thus the policies implemented by the ministry also has large implications on the economy of the country. However, there has been criticisms of the ministry in being inadequate in tackling the decreased efficiency and productivity of this industry, due to the lack of clear policy recommendations by the ministry as well as the low rate of assets renewal in the industry.

The ministry has thus partnered several international organisations in combating these various agricultural and environmental problems. Several of these organisations include the International Fund for Agricultural Development and United Nations Convention to Combat Desertification.

== See also ==
- Agriculture in Kyrgyzstan
