= Education in Kyrgyzstan =

Education in Kyrgyzstan is compulsory for nine years, between ages seven and 15. Following four years of primary and five years of lower secondary school, the system offers two years of upper secondary school, specialized secondary school, or vocational/technical school.

The Ministry of Education and Science (MES) is in charge of education in Kyrgyzstan. Budget cuts that have reduced teacher salaries and equipment availability are reflected disproportionately in reduced numbers of female students.

In 2008, 3.7 percent of gross domestic product was spent on education. In 2001 some 89 percent of the relevant age-group was enrolled in the compulsory program, but this figure has decreased in the early 2000s. In 2004 the literacy rate in Kyrgyzstan was 98.7 percent.

The Human Rights Measurement Initiative (HRMI) finds that Kyrgyzstan is fulfilling only 89.3% of what it should be fulfilling for the right to education based on the country's level of income. HRMI breaks down the right to education by looking at the rights to both primary education and secondary education. While taking into consideration Kyrgyzstan's income level, the nation is achieving 84.2% of what should be possible based on its resources (income) for primary education and 94.4% for secondary education.

As of 2023, there were 4,989 primary and secondary schools in the country, including 445 in Bishkek. The large majority of these (4,537) were public schools. The country also counted 58 higher educational institutions and universities.

== Structure and organization ==
=== Pre-school and primary education ===
Pre-school is addressed to children from 3 to 6/7 and is not compulsory. Access to it is limited (net enrollment ratio of 10% in 2005).

Primary school usually starts at 6 or 7, lasts four years and is compulsory. Since 2007, uniforms are required in primary education. The law was pointed out as a source of school-drop out, as the uniform has to be bought by the parents. Teaching quality is sometimes described as "poor": Kyrgyzstan ranked last in reading, mathematics and science at PISA 2006.

=== Secondary education ===
Secondary education begins with the basic secondary education, which lasts four years and is compulsory. Students have then the choice between comprehensive and vocation educations.

Comprehensive education is constituted of a two-year curriculum, which grants — if completed — a certificate of completion ("attestat"). The certificate is generally required to join a university.

Vocational education is offered through three kinds of courses: A three-year course mixing vocational and general education and preparing for higher education, a two-year course mixing vocational and general education (without preparation to higher education), and a ten-month course of pure vocational education (also open to adults). Vocational education is given in professional lyceum and vocational technical colleges.

=== Tertiary education ===
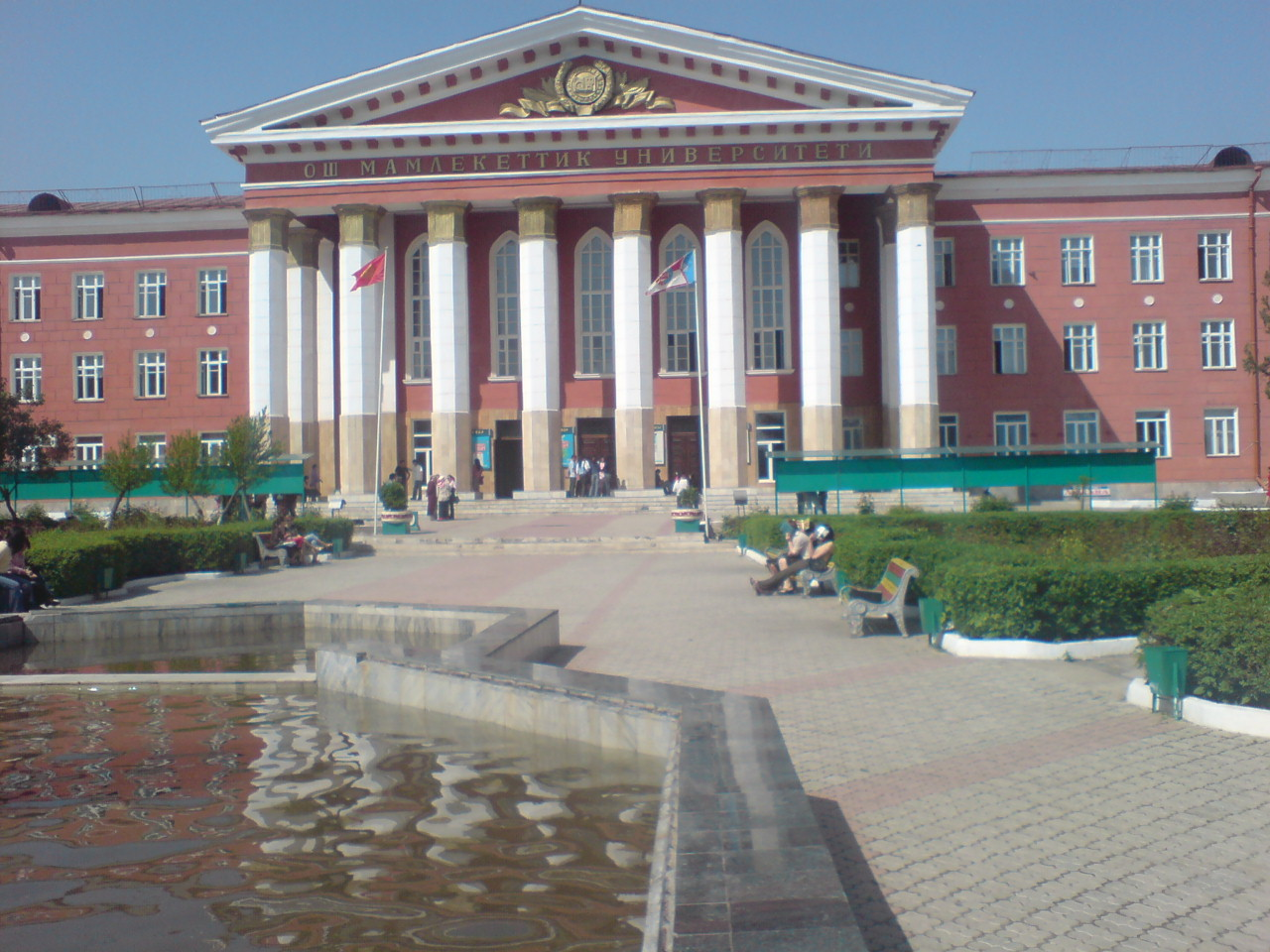
Osh State University

Higher education includes universities, academies, specialized higher education institutes and institutes. As of 2023, the country counted 58 higher educational institutions and universities, out of which 42 were public and 16 private.

The gross enrolment rate in higher education was 12.5% in 2011/2012.

Universities deliver bachelor's (Bakalavr) degrees in four years, which allows students to pursue master's (Magistr) programs, lasting two years. They also offer a "specialist degree" (specialist) in five (or six for medical and architecture studies) years. The specialist and the master's degrees open the door to PhD programs (aspirantura).

Academies offer the same degrees in fields of scientific activity. An institute is usually a specialized branch of a university or an academy. Specialized higher education institutes are narrow profiles institutions.

There were criticisms about the competency of university lecturers in Kyrgyzstan: if a master's degree is theoretically required to teach at university, most teachers actually hold a Bachelor or even no degree at all.

== See also ==
- List of universities in Kyrgyzstan
- Ministry of Education and Science (Kyrgyzstan)
