= Prosecutor General's Office of Kyrgyzstan =

The Prosecutor General's emblem.

The Prosecutor General's Office of Kyrgyzstan (Kyrgyz: Кыргызстандын Башкы прокуратурасы, Russian: Генеральная прокуратура Кыргызстана) is a Kyrgyz government agency which is responsible for maintaining and supervising the public procurator system in Kyrgyzstan. The Prosecutor General of Kyrgyzstan is the highest government judicial official in Kyrgyzstan, who oversees the enforcement of the Kyrgyz legal system and the activities of law enforcement agencies. The Prosecutor General is nominated by the President of Kyrgyzstan and is confirmed by the Supreme Council. The office is located on 139 Toktonaliyev Street in the capital of Bishkek.

== Duties ==
The Office of the Prosecutor General is responsible for:

- Representing both the state and the general public in the court of law
- Supervise the observance of laws by law enforcement bodies in Kyrgyzstan
- Supervision of the observance of laws in criminal cases
- Ensure the personal liberties of citizens are being identified and respected

== History ==
On November 29, 1924, Mikhail Beznosikov was appointed the first prosecutor of the Kara-Kirghiz Autonomous Oblast, the precursor to the current prosecutor general's office. In 1936, the prosecutor's office, along with other law enforcement bodies formed the prosecutor's office of the Kirghiz SSR. As a result of the Declaration on State Sovereignty of the Kyrgyz Republic on 15 December 1990, the regional prosecution authorities in Kyrgyzstan distinguished themselves and gave themselves precedence over the Procurator General of the Soviet Union. In December 1993, the Jogorku Kenesh passed a law which saw the formalization of national legal prosecution bodies in independent Kyrgyzstan. Its functions were defined in law in July 2000. In light of the Tulip Revolution and the Kyrgyz Revolution of 2010, the office's main tasks were focused mostly on fighting government corruption.

== List of Prosecutors General ==
| Name | Start date | End date |
|---|---|---|
| Cholpon Baekova | 1990 | 1993 |
| Asanbek Sharshenaliev | 1993 | 2000 |
| Chubak Abyshkaev | 2000 | 2002 |
| Myktybek Abdyldayev | 2002 | 2005 |
| Murat Sutalinov | 23 March 2005 | 24 March 2005 |
| Azimbek Beknazarov | 24 March 2005 | 19 September 2005 |
| Busurmankul Tabaldiev | 19 September 2005 | ? |
| Kambaraly Kongantiy | 2005 | 2007 |
| Elmurza Satybaldiev | 2007 | 2009 |
| Nurlan Tursunkulov | 2009 | 2010 |
| Baytemir Ibraev | 7 April 2010 | 13 September 2010 |
| Kubatbek Baybolov | 13 September 2010 | 31 March 2011 |
| Aida Salyanova | 14 April 2011 | 22 January 2015 |
| Indira Dzholddubaeva | 22 January 2015 | 26 April 2018 |
| Otkurbek Dzhamshitov | 26 April 2018 | 2020 |
| Kurmankul Zulushеv | 21 October 2020 | 2024 |
| Maksat Asanaliev | 5 June 2024 | Present |
