= Aida Salyanova =

Kyrgyz politician (born 1972)

Aida Salyanova (born August 1972) is a deputy of the Jogorku Kenesh, Prosecutor General of Kyrgyzstan (2011-2015), Minister of Justice (2010), and State Counselor of Justice Class 3. She is married and has a son and two daughters.

== Early life and career ==
Aida Salyanova was born on 6 August 1972 in the city of Naryn in the Kyrgyz SSR. In 1991 she graduated from Frunze College Soviet Torgo.

- 1996–1997: University of the Kyrgyz National University professor.
- 1997–2005: Jogorku Kenesh of the Kyrgyz Republic, the expert of the legal department.
- In 2000, she became a candidate of legal sciences, associate professor.
- 2005–2008: Jogorku Kenesh of the Kyrgyz Republic, Head of the Department for Constitutional Legislation, State Structure, Legality and judicial and legal reform of the Jogorku Kenesh.
- 2008–2010: The Ministry of Justice of the Kyrgyz Republic, the State Secretary.
- July 14, 2010 – 20 December 2010: The Minister of Justice of the Kyrgyz Republic.
- December 20, 2010 – 31 March 2014: Plenipotentiary Representative of the President of Kyrgyzstan in Ken Jogorku
- 14 April 2011 – 22 January 2015: The Prosecutor General of the Kyrgyz Republic.
- October 4, 2015 – present: Member of the Parliament of VI convocation.
