= Dogdurkul Kendirbaeva =

Kyrgyz educator and politician (born 1965)

- Догдуркул Кендирбаева
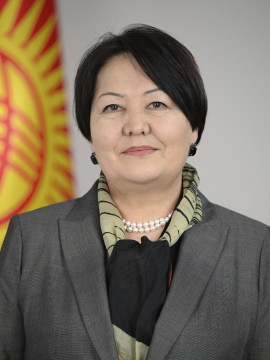
- Official portrait

Minister of Education and Science
- Incumbent
- Assumed office 6 October 2023
- President: Sadyr Japarov
- Prime Minister: Adylbek Kasymaliev
- Preceded by: Kanybek Imanaliev

Personal details
- Born: 25 July 1965 (age 61)
- Education: Kyrgyz State National University

Dogdurkul Sharsheevna Kendirbaeva (Kyrgyz: Догдуркул Шаршеевна Кендирбаева; born 26 July 1965) is a Kyrgyz educator and politician. She has been serving as Minister of Education and Science of Kyrgyzstan since 2023.

== Career ==
Kendirbaeva was born on 26 July 1965. She got a degree in social sciences and history from the Kyrgyz State National University in 1991.

She began her career working on a farm in Orgochar, in Jeti-Ögüz District, where she was also history teacher in a secondary school, and subsequently served as an educational consultant for the Asian Development Bank’s Community-Based Early Childhood Development project, as well as head of the Issyk-Kul Regional Department of Education, and director and coordinator of regional educational organisations in the Issyk-Kul region. She was also first deputy head of the Akimat of the Jeti-Oguz District between 2003 and 2004.

From July 2012, she served as deputy minister of education and science until she resigned in September 2014. Between 2014 and 2023, Kendirbaeva was director of the Roza Otunbayeva Initiative International Public Foundation. In 2020 became assistant to the minister of education.

After Kanybek Imanaliev was dismissed as Minister of Education and Science on 7 September 2023, Kendirbaeva became acting Minsiter of Education and Science on 28 September. The Supreme Council approved her nomination on 5 October and President Sadyr Japarov appointed her by decree on 6 October 2023. As minister, she has championed the updating of textbooks, the digitisation of resources and the education, as well as pay rises for teachers, the modernisation of the education system by promoting the transition from the traditional model to a twelve-year education system, tackling the shortage of teachers, and developing early years education programmes to increase pre-school coverage to 80% of children by 2028.
