= Jyldyz Mambetaliyeva =

Jyldyz Mambetaliyeva (Жылдыз Мамбеталиева) (born 26 January 1971) is the justice minister of Kyrgyzstan.

She graduated from the Kazan State University in 1993 with a degree in jurisprudence.

== Career ==
- 1993–1994 Consultant of the Constitutional Court of the Kyrgyz Republic
- 1994–1995 The prosecutor of Osh oblast prosecutor's office
- 1995–1996 Assistant Attorney in the Attorney General's Office of the Kyrgyz Republic
- 1996–1999 Assistant of the Legal Department of the Government Office of the Kyrgyz Republic
- 1999–2005 Expert Consultant, Expert, Head of Sector of the Legal Department of the Prime Minister of the Kyrgyz Republic
- 2005–2008 Deputy head of the department of legal support and human resources services the Government Office
- 2008–2015 Deputy Minister of Justice of the Kyrgyz Republic
- From February 2015 Minister of Justice of the Kyrgyz Republic
