= American University of Central Asia =

University in Bishkek, Kyrgyzstan

- Борбордук Азиядагы Америка Университети; Американский университет в Центральной Азии
- Former name: Kyrgyz American School American University in Kyrgyzstan (AUK)
- Motto: Knowledge, Wisdom, Freedom
- Type: University
- Established: 1993
- President: Timothy O'Connor
- Vice-president: Chyngyz Shamshiev
- Academic staff: 310
- Administrative staff: 120
- Undergraduates: 1200
- Location: Bishkek, Kyrgyzstan
- Campus: Urban
- Colors: Blue and gold
- Website: www.auca.kg

University rankings

Global – Overall
- QS World: 901-950 (2026)

Regional – Overall
- QS Asia: =262 (2026)
- QS Emerging Europe and Central Asia: 138 (2022)

The American University of Central Asia (AUCA) (Kyrgyz: Борбордук Азиядагы Америка Университети; Russian: Американский Университет Центральной Азии), formerly the Kyrgyz-American School and the American University in Kyrgyzstan, is a liberal arts university located in Bishkek, the capital of the Kyrgyz Republic.

== History ==
AUCA began its existence in 1993 as the Kyrgyz-American School, a specialist school within the Kyrgyz State National University in Bishkek. In 1997, it was established as an independent institution and given a new name, the American University in Kyrgyzstan. Funding was provided by the United States government and the Open Society Institute, an NGO established by Hungarian philanthropist George Soros. One of its founders was human rights attorney and journalist Scott Horton.

In 2002, AUCA adopted its current name, to reflect both that its student body was drawn from many countries, and the university's goal was to serve the entire region. While the university focuses on offering higher education opportunities to Central Asian students, its student body and faculty increasingly come from all over Asia and other parts of the world.

In March 2010, AUCA established a partnership with Bard College located in New York State in the United States. The partnership allows students of American Studies, Anthropology, Economics, European Studies, International and Comparative Politics, Journalism and Mass Communications, Psychology, Sociology, and Software Engineering programs to receive liberal arts degrees fully accredited in the US.

According to the USAID accreditation report, "AUCA is the first higher education institution in Central Asia that functions according to the American model, with a credit-hour system, an American-style liberal arts curriculum, and a commitment to democratic values, freedom of expression and inquiry, and academic integrity and honesty."

The university is chartered in Kyrgyzstan and is authorized by the Kyrgyz Ministry of Education to offer the Kyrgyz National Diploma in eleven undergraduate programs and one graduate program, an MBA. AUCA also offers American-style diplomas, and students are required to take courses in both Russian and English.

After the US troop withdrawal from Afghanistan in 2021, and the subsequent collapse of the Islamic Republic of Afghanistan, a number of Afghan students continued their studies at AUCA. The 2022 AUCA commencement was a joint events with students graduating from the American University of Afghanistan.

=== Old Campus ===
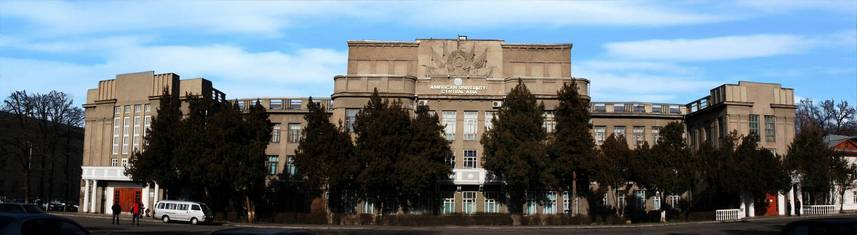
AUCA old campus

The former main building of American University of Central Asia was constructed in the 1930s and was used by the Central Committee of the Communist Party of the Kirghiz SSR, and by the Supreme Soviet of the Kirghiz Soviet Socialist Republic.

Portraits of Vladimir Lenin, Karl Marx, and Friedrich Engels still hang in the conference hall of the old main building of AUCA, while the coat of arms of the Kirghiz SSR is kept on the facade of the building.

In 2008 Iskhak Masaliev, then a Kyrgyz parliament member from the Party of Communists of Kyrgyzstan, called to change the location of AUCA, because of the "historic value" of the current main building.

=== New Campus ===
The new building, opened in 2015, has four stories and is centered around a forum that serves as the main meeting place. The main building uses geothermal heating and rainwater harvesting to reduce its environmental impact. The building was designed by New York based architect Henry Myerberg and is located to the south of the central part of Bishkek.

== Academic programs ==
=== New Generation Academy ===
The university offers full-time and part-time programs to prepare students for university study. The programs include an intensive course of English language learning, College Mathematics and university-level academic classes.Participants can also complete program in the Russian language. Students able to apply for the scholarship program.

=== Undergraduate programs ===
The university offers American-style Bachelor of Arts degrees in 15 undergraduate programs:

- Anthropology, technology and international development
- Applied mathematics and informatics
- Business administration
- Economics
- Environmental sustainability and climate science
- International and comparative politics
- International and business law
- Liberal Arts and Sciences or Liberal arts education
- Journalism and mass communication
- Psychology
- Sociology
- Software engineering
- Television, cinema and media arts

The university's General Education Program offers units from a core curriculum, that may be taken towards credits in any undergraduate program.

=== Graduate programs ===
In addition to its undergraduate programs, AUCA offers professional programs in ten of Kyrgyzstan's "most needed specialties." These are:

- Master of Arts
  - Anthropology, Urbanism and International Development
  - Applied psychology
  - Central Asian studies
  - Journalism
  - Sociology
- Master of Arts in Teaching
- Master of Business Administration (MBA)
- Master of Laws (LL.M.)
- Master of Science in Economics Program (MSc)
- Master in Talent Management and Human Potential Development

=== Library ===
AUCA Library provides information resources and services in support of teaching, learning and research. The library holds about 60,000 items in its print collection of books, textbooks, manuscripts and other materials. The library provides access to 30 online databases. The Library of AUCA partnered with Kyrgyz Libraries Information Consortium in 2006 to initiate Open Access in Kyrgyzstan. The American University of Central Asia acted as the pilot university for the Electronic Archive program. Today, the library offers open access to 21 different resources, all listed on the website.

== Rankings ==
In 2026, American University of Central Asia was ranked 262nd among universities in Asia and 14th among universities in Central Asia by Quacquarelli Symonds University Rankings. The same organization ranked its as 138th among universities from the emerging Europe and Central Asia region in 2022.

== Governance ==
=== President ===
1. John Clark (1997–1999)
2. David Huwiler (1999–2004); John D. Dreier (2004–2005, acting)
3. Ellen Hurwitz (2005–2010)
4. Andrew Wachtel (2010–2018); Jonathan Becker (2018–2019, interim)
5. Andrew Kuchins (2019–2021); Jonathan Becker (2021–2023, interim)
6. Timothy E. O'Connor (2023–present)

=== Provost/Vice-President for Academic Affairs ===
1. Kamilla Sharshekeeva (1997–2005)
2. Gulnara Aitbaeva (2005)
3. Bakyt Beshimov (2005–2007)
4. Bermet Tursunkulova (2008–2015)
5. Nurgul Ukueva (2019–2023)
6. Chynarkul Ryskulova (2023–present)

== Gallery ==
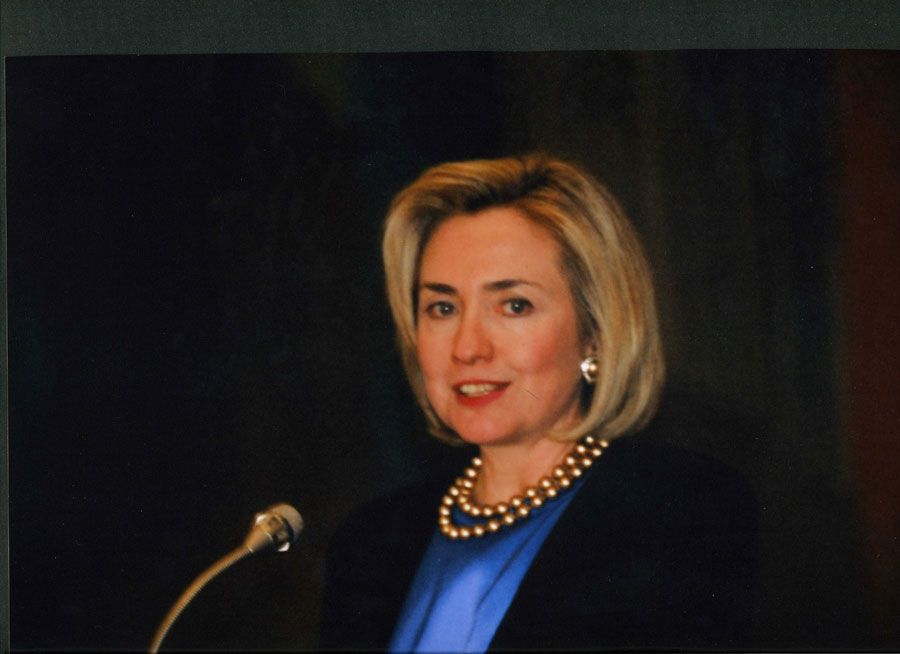
Hillary Clinton delivering her speech during her visit to AUCA on November 11, 1997

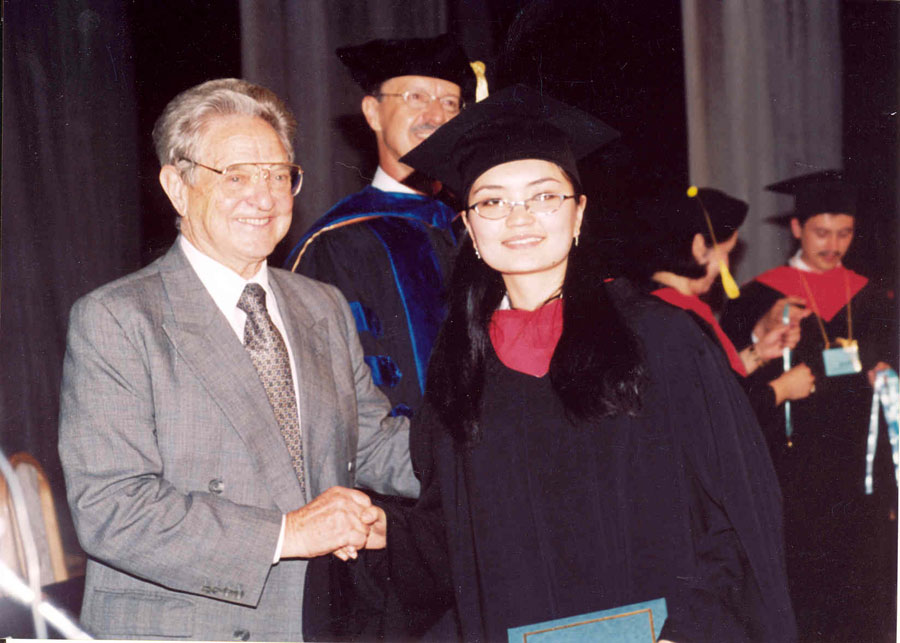
Financer and philanthropist George Soros congratulates a new graduate at the Commencement ceremony of 2003.

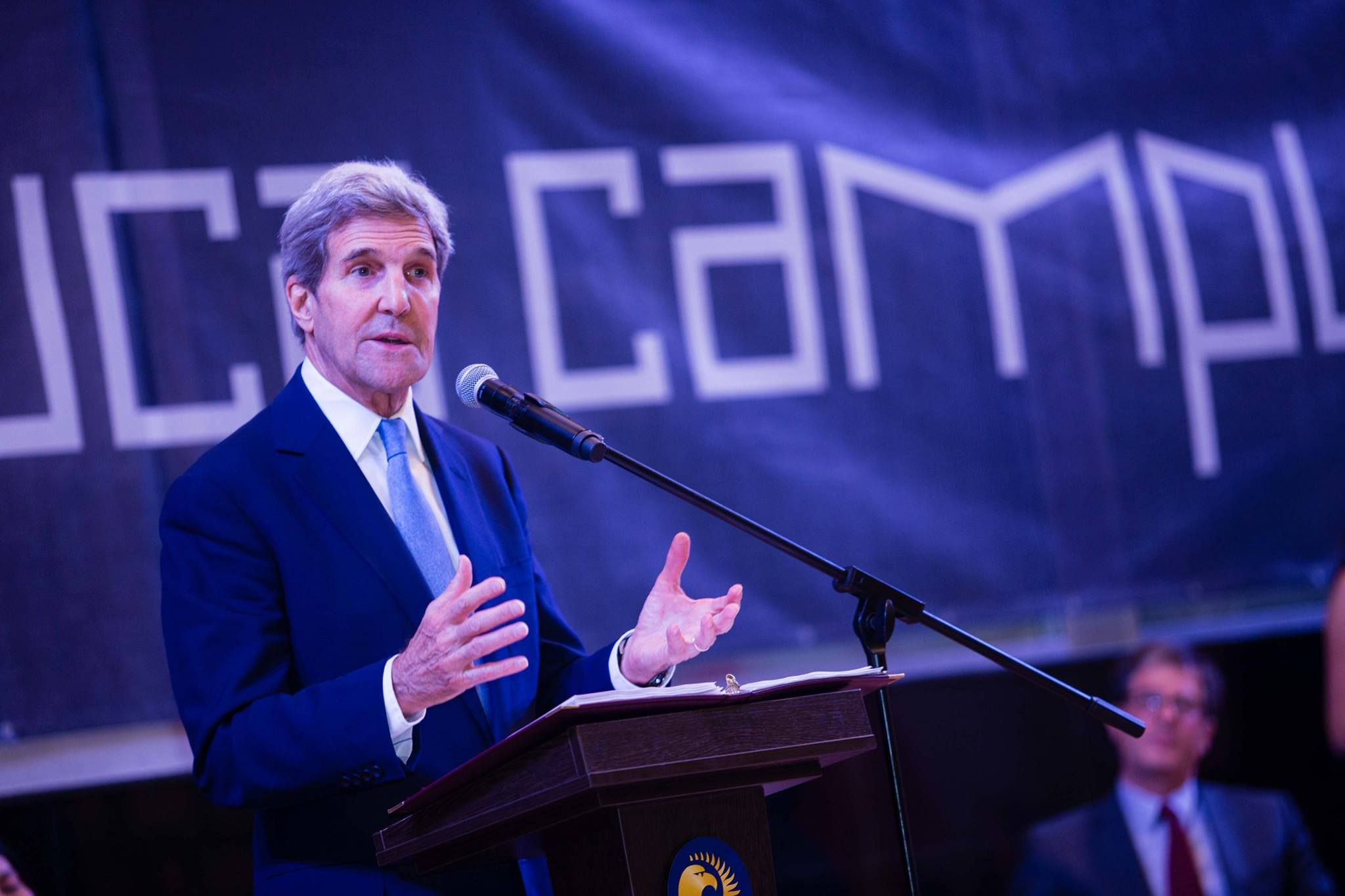
John Kerry at the opening ceremony of the AUCA new campus on October 31, 2015

== See also ==
- Higher education in Kyrgyzstan
- Education in Kyrgyzstan
- American University of Afghanistan
- Bard College
- Central Asian University
