= List of companies of Kyrgyzstan =

Location of Kyrgyzstan

The economy of Kyrgyzstan is highly dependent on agriculture and mining, as both sectors make up more than one-third of Kyrgyzstan's economy. While it was part of the Soviet Union, Kyrgyzstan was one of the major producers of uranium during the 1950s. However, uranium mining activity would cease to exist by the 1990s. In 2022, Kyrgyzstan gained full control of the Kumtor Gold Mine, one of the largest gold deposits in the world, after settling a dispute with Centerra Gold. In 2021, the three major export partners of Kyrgyzstan were the United Kingdom, Kazakhstan, and Russia and in 2019, the three major import partners of Kyrgyzstan were China, Russia, and Kazakhstan.

== Notable firms ==
This list includes notable companies with a primary headquarters located in the country. The industry and sector both follow the Industry Classification Benchmark taxonomy and organizations that have ceased operations are included and noted as defunct.

Notable companies Status: P=Private, S=State; A=Active, D=Defunct
Name	Industry	Sector	Headquarters	Founded	Notes	Status	
Devolution	IT Engineering	IT Company	Bishkek	2023	builds software, mobile apps, and fintech solutions	P	A
Aero Nomad Airlines	Consumer services	Airlines	Bishkek	2021	Domestic airline	P	A
Air Bishkek	Consumer services	Airlines	Bishkek	2006	Defunct 2016	P	D
Agym	Media	Mass media	Bishkek	2001	Biweekly newspaper	P	A
AKIpress News Agency	Media	Mass media	Bishkek	2000	The first independent news agency from Kyrgyzstan	P	A
Avia Traffic Company	Consumer services	Airlines	Bishkek	2003	Banned from European airspace	P	A
Kloop	Media	Mass media	Bishkek	2007	Digital newspaper	P	A
Kabar	Media	Mass media	Bishkek	1937	The oldest news agency from Kyrgyzstan	P	A
Kyrgyz Express Post	Industrial transportation	Delivery services	Bishkek	2012	The main postal service of Kyrgyzstan	P	A
Kyrgyz Railway	Industrials	Railroads	Bishkek	1992	National railways	S	A
National Bank of the Kyrgyz Republic	Financials	Banks	Bishkek	1991	Reserve bank of Kyrgyzstan	S	A
Sky KG Airlines	Consumer services	Airlines	Bishkek	2004	Charter airline	P	A
The Times of Central Asia	Media	Mass media	Bishkek	1999	English language digital newspaper	P	A
