= Jumabek Ibraimov =

Kyrgyz politician (1944–1999)

- Жумабек Ибраимов

5th Prime Minister of Kyrgyzstan
- In office 25 December 1998 – 4 April 1999
- President: Askar Akayev
- Preceded by: Kubanychbek Jumaliyev
- Succeeded by: Amangeldy Muraliyev

Personal details
- Born: 1 January 1944 Jangy-Alysh, Kirghiz SSR, Soviet Union (now Kyrgyzstan)
- Died: 4 April 1999 (aged 55) Bishkek, Kyrgyzstan
- Party: Social Democratic Party of Kyrgyzstan
- Other political affiliations: Communist Party of Kirghizia

Jumabek Ibraim uulu Ibraimov (Kyrgyz: Жумабек Ибраим уулу Ибраимов; 1 January 1944 – 4 April 1999) was a Kyrgyz politician. He served as Prime Minister from 1998 to 1999 and as Mayor of Bishkek from 1993 to 1995.

Ibraimov was born in Dzhany-Alysh of Kemin District he graduated from Frunze Polytechnic Institute in 1971. He was a post-graduate student and worked as a teacher until mid-1970s. In 1976–1977, he worked as an engineer and the head of the department of technology at the Agricultural Machinery Works named after M. V. Frunze, and from 1977 to 1984 as a design engineer, head of engineering department, chief engineer, and director of Min-Kush branch of Orgtehnika factory. In 1984, he became a head of People's Control Commission, and the First Secretary of Balykchy Town Committee of the Communist Party of Kirghizia.

From 1988 to 1991, Ibraimov served as a First Deputy of a Head of Administration of Central Committee of the Communist Party of Kyrgyzstan. He served as the mayor of Bishkek from 1993 to 1995, and in 1993 he was among the founders of the Social Democratic Party of Kyrgyzstan. President of Kyrgyzstan Askar Akayev appointed him Prime Minister on 25 December 1998 after Akayev dissolved the Cabinet. Ibraimov served until he died of stomach cancer on 4 April 1999.

Political offices
Preceded by Boris Silayev (acting)	Prime Minister of Kyrgyzstan; 1998–1999	Succeeded by Boris Silayev (acting)
