= Adylbek Kasymaliev =

Kyrgyzstani politician (born 1960)

- Адылбек Касымалиев
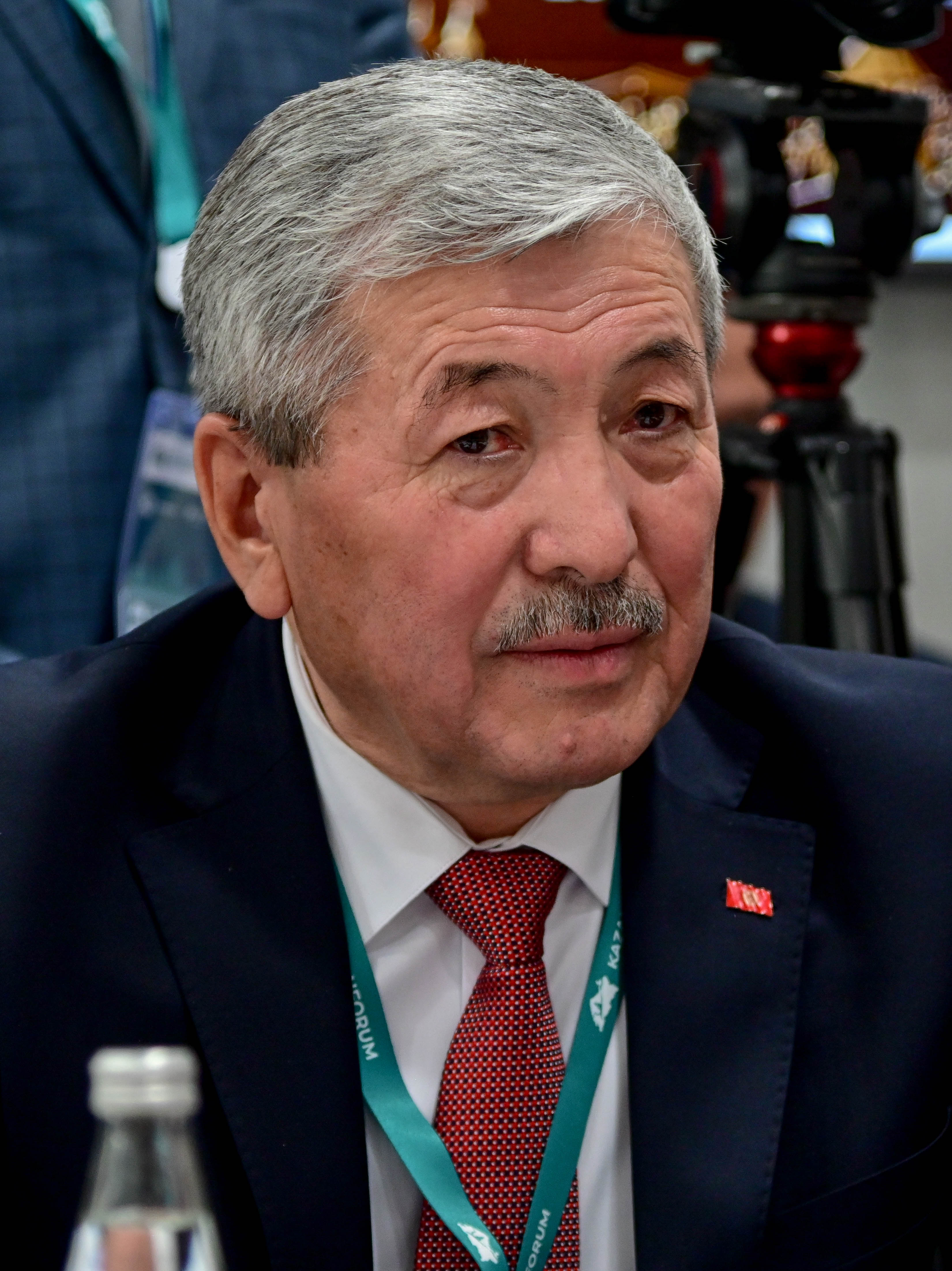
- Kasymaliev in 2024

3rd Chairman of the Cabinet of Ministers of Kyrgyzstan Head of the Presidential Administration
- Incumbent
- Assumed office 18 December 2024; Acting: 16 – 18 December 2024
- President: Sadyr Japarov
- Preceded by: Akylbek Japarov

First Deputy Chairman of the Cabinet of Ministers of Kyrgyzstan
- In office 20 June 2022 – 16 December 2024; Acting: 15 – 17 June 2022
- President: Sadyr Japarov
- Prime Minister: Akylbek Japarov

Minister of Economy and Finance
- In office 2 May 2015 – 6 December 2018
- Prime Minister: Temir Sariyev; Sooronbay Jeenbekov; Sapar Isakov; Mukhammedkalyi Abylgaziev
- Preceded by: Olga Lavrova
- Succeeded by: Baktygul Jeenbaeva

Personal details
- Born: 1 December 1960 (age 65) Tyupsky District, Issyk-Kul Region, Kirghiz SSR

Adylbek Aleshovich Kasymaliev (Kyrgyz: Адылбек Алешович Касымалиев, born 1 December 1960) is a Kyrgyzstani politician and economist who has served as the Chairman of the Cabinet of Ministers of Kyrgyzstan since 2024.

Previously, he served as its First Deputy Chairman from 20 June 2022 to 16 December 2024. He also served as the Minister of Economy and Finance from 2 May 2015 to 6 December 2018.

== Early life and education ==
Kasymaliev was born on 1 December 1960, in the village Dolon, Issyk-Kul Region. In 1984, he finished his studies at Leningrad Financial-Economic Institute, becoming an economist. That year, he became a junior research fellow at the Research Institute of Economics and Economic-Mathematical Methods of Planning of the Gosplan of the Kirghiz SSR. In the early 90s, he worked in the State Tax Inspectorate for the Oktyabr District, Bishkek. In 1994, he joined the Ministry of Finance.

He then served in various functions in the government of Kyrgyzstan. In 2010, he became Chairman of the State Tax Service under the Government. In 2015-2018 - Minister of Finance of the Kyrgyz Republic to Temir Sariyev, Sooronbay Jeenbekov, Sapar Isakov and Mukhammedkalyi Abylgaziev. For the next three to four years, he served on various nonprofits to include the board of the Hungarian-Kyrgyz Development Fund. From May 14, 2021 to 2022 -the Administration of the President as its deputy head. A year later, he became First Deputy Chairman of the Cabinet of Ministers. Since 18 December 2024, he has served as Chairman of the Cabinet of Ministers Head of the Administration of the President of the Kyrgyz Republic.

== Awards ==
- Honored Economist of the Kyrgyz Republic (June 26, 2007)
- Honorary Diploma of the Kyrgyz Republic (November 24, 2001)
- Jubilee badge “100th anniversary of the formation of the Kara-Kyrgyz Autonomous Region” (February 20, 2025)

Political offices
Preceded by Akylbek Japarov	Chairman of the Cabinet of Ministers of Kyrgyzstan; 2024–present	Succeeded by Incumbent
Preceded by Sadyr Japarov	First Deputy Chairman of Kyrgyzstan; 2022–2024	Succeeded by Akylbek Japarov
Preceded by Olga Lavrova	Ministry of Economy and Finance; 2015–2018	Succeeded by Baktygul Jeenbaeva
