= Economy of Kyrgyzstan =

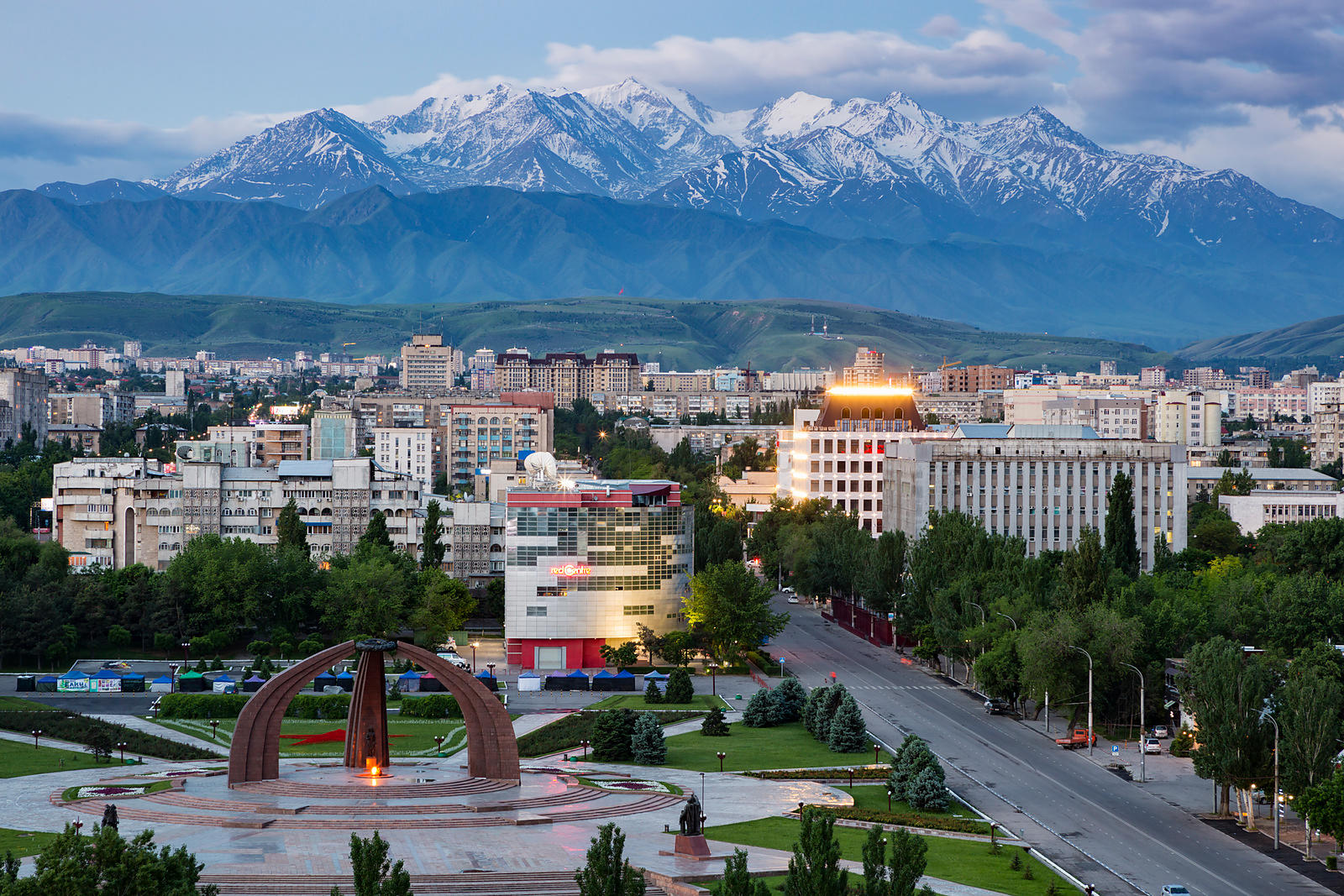
- Bishkek, the capital and financial center of Kyrgyzstan
- Currency: Kyrgyz som (KGS)
- Fiscal year: calendar year
- Trade organisations: WTO, EAEU, OTS, SCO, CIS, ECO
- Country group: Developing/Emerging; Lower-middle income economy

Statistics
- Population: ▲7.3 million (2025)
- GDP: ▲$26.69 billion (2026); ▲$76.24 billion (PPP, 2026)
- GDP rank: 125th (nominal, 2026); 118st (PPP, 2026)
- GDP growth: ▲11.1% (2025); ▲8.6% (2026f)
- GDP per capita: ▲$3,620 (nominal, 2026); ▲$10,341 (PPP, 2026)
- GDP per capita rank: 141th (nominal, 2026); 132th (PPP, 2026)
- GDP per capita growth: ▲9.3% (2025)
- GDP by sector: Agriculture: 14.6%; Industry: 31.2%; Services: 52% (2024)
- Inflation (CPI): ▲8% (2025)
- Population below national poverty line: ▼29.8% below poverty line (2023)
- Gini coefficient: ▼28.8 low (2021)
- Human Development Index: ▲0.720 high (2023) (117th); ▲0.649 medium IHDI (2023, 71st rank)
- Corruption Perceptions Index: 26 out of 100 points (2024, 142nd rank)
- Labour force: ▲2,863,490 (2025); ▲63.3% employment rate (2024)
- Unemployment: ▼6.2% (2018)
- Youth unemployment: ▼14.2% youth unemployment (2018)
- Informal employment: 57.5% (2023)
- Main industries: small machinery, textiles, food processing, cement, shoes, lumber, refrigerators, furniture, electric motors, gold, rare earth metals

External
- Exports: ▲$8.81 billion (2024)
- Export goods: Agricultural products 11.3%; Fuels and mining products 9.5%; Manufacturers 22.7%; Others 56.5%
- Main export partners: United Kingdom 19.9%; Kazakhstan 18.1%; Russia 17.3%; United Arab Emirates 9.1%; Switzerland 7.8%; Uzbekistan 7.7%; China 4.7%; Turkey 3.9%; Thailand 1.5%; Germany 1.1% (2024)
- Imports: ▲$25.00 billion (2024 est.)
- Import goods: Agricultural products 13.4%; Fuels and mining products 10.8%; Manufacturers 69.7%; Others 6.1%
- Main import partners: China 53.8%; Russia 18.3%; Uzbekistan 6.4%; Turkey 6.2%; Kazakhstan 5.1%; United Arab Emirates 1.5%; South Korea 0.9%; Belarus 0.7%; United States 0.5%; India 0.4% (2024)
- FDI stock: ▲$6.003 billion (2017); ▲ Abroad: $709.3 million (2017)
- Current account: −$306 million (2017)
- Gross external debt: ▼$5.164 billion (31 September 2022 est.)

Public finance
- Government debt: ▲41% of GDP (2022)
- Foreign reserves: ▲$7 billion (2025)
- Budget balance: −3.2% (of GDP) (2017)
- Revenue: 2.169 billion (2017 est.)
- Spending: 2.409 billion (2017)
- Economic aid: $49 million from the US (2001)
- Credit rating: Standard & Poor's: B+ stable, March 2025; Fitch: B stable, April 2025; Moody's: B3 positive, July 2025
- All values, unless otherwise stated, are in US dollars.

Kyrgyzstan has a developing economy, highly dependent on the agricultural sector. Cotton, tobacco, wool, and meat are the main agricultural products, although only tobacco and cotton are exported in any quantity. According to Healy Consultants, Kyrgyzstan's economy relies heavily on the strength of industrial exports, with plentiful reserves of gold, mercury and uranium. The economy also relies heavily on remittances from foreign workers.

Following independence, Kyrgyzstan was progressive in carrying out market reforms, such as an improved regulatory system and land reform. In 1998, Kyrgyzstan was the first Commonwealth of Independent States (CIS) country to be accepted into the World Trade Organization. Much of the government's stock in enterprises has been sold. Kyrgyzstan's economic performance has been hindered by widespread corruption, low foreign investment and general regional instability. Despite those issues, Kyrgyzstan is ranked 70th (as of 2019) on the ease of doing business index.

Since 2020, Kyrgyzstan has achieved greater political stability after years of turmoil.

== History ==
Historically, the region underwent rapid industrialization and agricultural collectivization, transforming from a nomadic society into a Soviet Socialist Republic in 1936. By the mid-20th century, the territory had established a diversified base including machinery tool construction, non-ferrous metallurgy and massive hydroelectric projects on the Naryn River. Despite this, the economy remained deeply dependent on central planning, with trade making up about 40% of its GDP by 1988.

The Kyrgyz economy was severely affected by the collapse of the Soviet Union and the resulting loss of its vast market. In 1990, some 98% of Kyrgyz exports went to other parts of the Soviet Union. By the 2000s, the government has reduced expenditures, ended most price subsidies and introduced a value-added tax in its transition to a market economy. Through economic stabilization and reform, the government seeks to establish a pattern of long-term consistent growth. Reforms led to the Kyrgyzstan's accession to the World Trade Organization (WTO) in December 1998. Difficulties remained in securing adequate fiscal revenues and providing a sufficient social safety net.

== Overview ==
Kyrgyzstan's principal exports are nonferrous metals and minerals, woolen goods and other agricultural products, electric energy and certain engineering goods. Its imports include petroleum and natural gas, ferrous metals, chemicals, most machinery, wood and paper products, food products and construction materials. Its leading trade partners include Germany, Russia, China and neighboring Kazakhstan and Uzbekistan.

Kyrgyzstan is also rich in mineral resources but has negligible petroleum and natural gas reserves and mostly imports petroleum and gas. Among its mineral reserves are substantial deposits of coal, gold, uranium, antimony, and other rare-earth metals. Metallurgy remains an important industry, with the government advocated foreign investment in this field, mainly in the extraction and processing of gold.

== Sectors ==
=== Agriculture ===
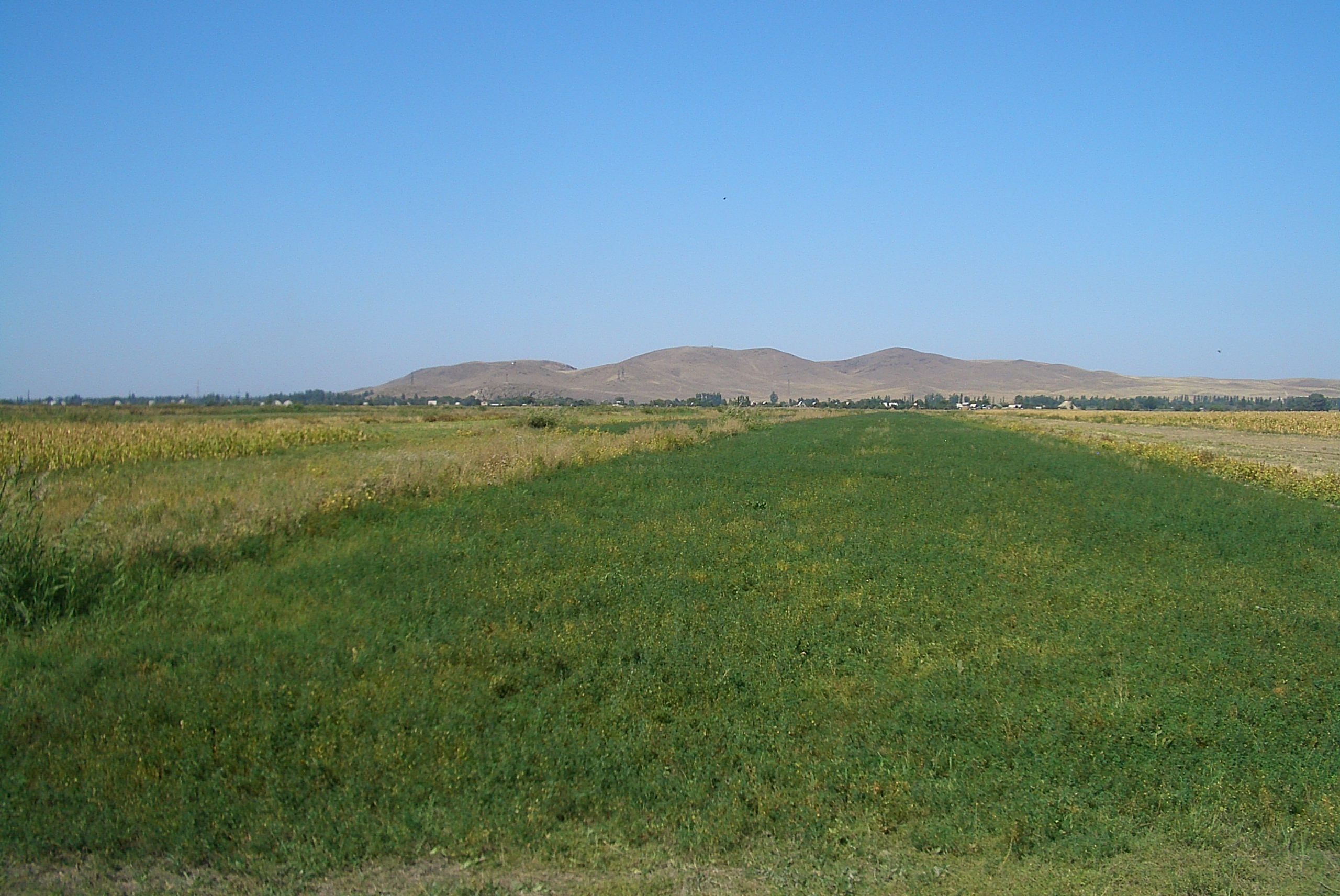
Irrigated fields in the Chuy Valley

Agriculture remains a vital part of Kyrgyzstan's economy and a refuge for workers displaced from industry. Subsistence farming has increased in the early 2000s. After sharp reductions in the early 1990s, by the early 2000s agricultural production was approaching 1991 levels. Grain production in the lower valleys and livestock grazing on upland pastures occupy the largest share of the agricultural workforce. Farmers are shifting to grain and away from cotton and tobacco. Other important products are dairy products, hay, animal feed, potatoes, vegetables, and sugar beets. Agricultural output comes from private household plots (55 percent of the total), private farms (40 percent), and state farms (5 percent). Further expansion of the sector depends on banking reform to increase investment, and on market reform to streamline the distribution of inputs. Land reform, a controversial issue in Kyrgyzstan, has proceeded very slowly since initial legislation in 1998. The irrigation infrastructure is in poor condition. Agriculture contributes about one-third of the GDP and more than one-third of employment.

Kyrgyzstan produced in 2018:

- 1.4 million tons of potato;
- 773 thousand tons of sugar beet;
- 692 thousand tons of maize;
- 615 thousand tons of wheat;
- 429 thousand tons of barley;
- 224 thousand tons of tomato;
- 218 thousand tons of watermelon;
- 209 thousand tons of onion;
- 176 thousand tons of carrot;
- 147 thousand tons of cabbage;
- 144 thousand tons of apple;
- 119 thousand tons of cucumber;
- 116 thousand tons of vegetable;
- 101 thousand tons of bean;
- 74 thousand tons of cotton;

In addition to smaller productions of other agricultural products, like apricot (25 thousand tons).

=== Forestry ===
Only 4 percent of Kyrgyzstan is classified as forested. All of that area is state-owned, and none is classified as available for wood supply. The main commercial product of the forests is walnuts.

=== Fishing ===
Kyrgyzstan does not have a significant fishing industry. In 2002 aquaculture contributed 66 percent of the country's total output of 142 metric tons of fish, but in 2003 the aquaculture industry collapsed, producing only 12 of the country's total of 26 metric tons.

=== Mining and minerals ===
In the post-Soviet era, mining has been an increasingly important economic activity. The Kumtor Gold Mine, which opened in 1997, is one of the largest gold deposits in the world. New gold mines are planned at Jerooy and Taldy–Bulak, and a major gold discovery was announced in late 2006 at Tokhtonysay. The state agency Kyrgyzaltyn owns all mines, many of which are operated as joint ventures with foreign companies. Uranium and antimony, important mineral outputs of the Soviet era, no longer are produced in significant amounts. Although between 1992 and 2003 coal output dropped from about 2.4 million tons to 411,000 tons, the government plans to increase exploitation of Kyrgyzstan's considerable remaining deposits (estimated at 2.5 billion tons) in order to reduce dependency on foreign energy sources. A particular target of this policy is the Kara–Keche deposit in northern Kyrgyzstan, whose annual output capability is estimated at between 500,000 and 1 million tons. The small domestic output of oil and natural gas does not meet national needs.

=== Industry and manufacturing ===
In the post-Soviet era, Kyrgyzstan's industries suffered sharp reductions in productivity because the supply of raw materials and fuels was disrupted, and Soviet markets disappeared. The sector has not recovered appreciably from that reduction; if gold production is not counted, in 2005 industry contributed only 14 percent of the gross domestic product (GDP). Investment and restructuring have remained at low levels, and the electricity industry (traditionally an important part of industry's contribution to GDP) has stagnated in recent years. Government support is moving away from the machine industries, which were a major contributor to the Soviet economy, toward clothing and textiles. Food processing accounted for 10 to 15 percent of industrial production until encountering a slump in 2004. In recent years, the glass industry has surpassed clothing and textiles in investment received and as a contributor to GDP. In the early 2000s, the construction industry has grown steadily because of large infrastructure projects such as highways and new gold mines. Housing construction, however, has lagged because of low investment.

=== Energy ===
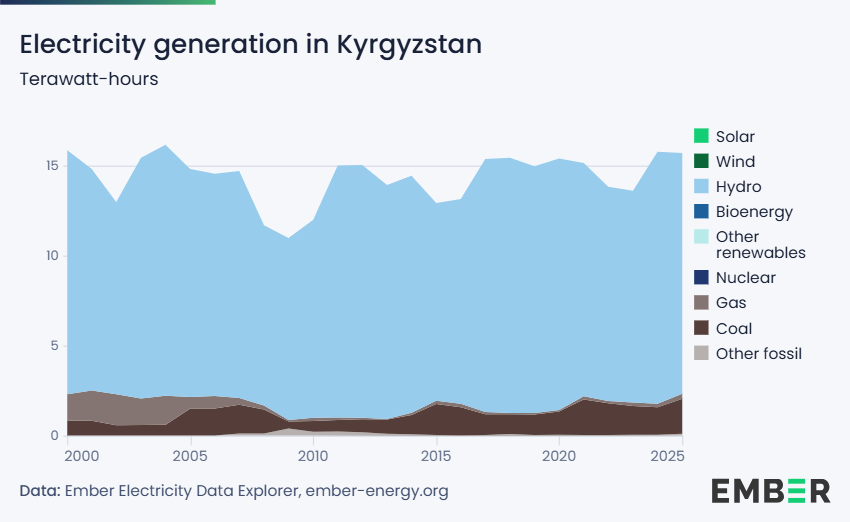
Electricity generation in Kyrgyzstan in terawatt-hours

More than ninety percent of electricity produced is hydroelectric and the country could produce much more of such clean energy and export to its neighbors and the region. Even though Kyrgyzstan has abundant hydro resources, only less than ten percent of its potential has been developed so far. It has limited deposits of fossil fuels and most of its natural gas imports come from Uzbekistan, with which Kyrgyzstan has had a series of imperfect barter agreements. Per capita energy consumption is high considering average income, and the government has no comprehensive plan to reduce demand. Up to 45 percent of electricity generated, especially in winter time, is diverted illegally or leaks from the distribution system.

Hydroelectric plants generate some 92.5 percent of domestically consumed electricity, and three commercial thermoelectric plants are in operation. Because of its rich supply of hydroelectric power, Kyrgyzstan sends electricity to Kazakhstan and Uzbekistan in return for fossil fuels. A new hydroelectric plant on the Naryn River at Kambar–Ata would supply power to parts of China and Russia, improving Kyrgyzstan's export situation and domestic energy supply. The plant was completed on August 30, 2010. An antiquated infrastructure and poor management make Kyrgyzstan more dependent on foreign energy in winter when water levels are low. In the early 2000s, Kyrgyzstan was exploiting only an estimated 10 percent of its hydroelectric power potential. In 2001 Kyrgyzstan had about 70,000 kilometers of power transmission lines served by about 500 substations. Kyrgyzstan would be a member of the Shanghai Cooperation Organisation's Asian Energy Club, which Russia proposed in 2006 to unify oil, gas, and electricity producers, consumers, and transit countries in the Central Asian region in a bloc that is self-sufficient in energy. Other members would be China, Kazakhstan, Tajikistan, and Uzbekistan.

Kyrgyzstan is a partner country of the EU INOGATE energy programme, which has four key topics: enhancing energy security, convergence of member state energy markets on the basis of EU internal energy market principles, supporting sustainable energy development, and attracting investment for energy projects of common and regional interest.

The South Korean style manufactured bituminous coal called yeontan (йонтан) is gaining popularity in Kyrgyzstan's energy industrial scene.

=== Services ===
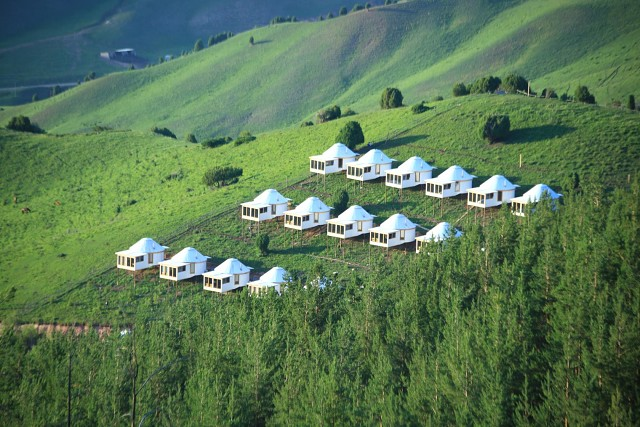
Glamping in Kyrgyzstan

Substantial post-Soviet growth in the services sector is mainly attributable to the appearance of small private enterprises. The central bank is the National Bank of the Kyrgyz Republic, which nominally is independent but follows government policy. Although the banking system has been reformed several times since 1991, it does not play a significant role in investment. High interest rates have discouraged borrowing. A stock market opened in 1995, but its main function is trading in government securities. Because of the Akayev regime's economic reforms, many small trade and catering enterprises have opened in the post-Soviet era. Although Kyrgyzstan's mountains and lakes are an attractive tourist destination, the tourism industry has grown very slowly because it has received little investment. In the early 2000s, an average of about 450,000 tourists visited annually, mainly from countries of the former Soviet Union.

==== Banking and finance ====
In October 2012, the International reserves and Foreign Currency Liquidity of Kyrgyzstan National Bank reached US$1.96 bln, 8.6% of which is in gold. In 2012, to diversify the assets of Kyrgyzstan, the basket of currencies has been expanded by means of the Chinese yuan and the Singapore dollar. In 2012, 1 billion soms are to be spent for the purchase of gold. Gold proportion in international reserves has already grown to 8.6%. The National Bank plans to increase it to 12-15% in future.

The tax regime in the Kyrgyz Republic is administered by the State Tax Service. Collected taxes reached 18.1% of GDP in 2012.

==== Education ====
Education in Kyrgyzstan is compulsory for nine years, between ages seven and 15. Following four years of primary and five years of lower secondary school, the system offers two years of upper secondary school, specialized secondary school, or vocational/technical school.

The Ministry of Education and Science (MES) is in charge of education in Kyrgyzstan. Budget cuts that have reduced teacher salaries and equipment availability are reflected disproportionately in reduced numbers of female students.

In 2008, 3.7 percent of gross domestic product was spent on education. In 2001 some 89 percent of the relevant age-group was enrolled in the compulsory program, but this figure has decreased in the early 2000s. In 2004 the literacy rate in Kyrgyzstan was 98.7 percent.

The Human Rights Measurement Initiative (HRMI) finds that Kyrgyzstan is fulfilling only 89.3% of what it should be fulfilling for the right to education based on the country's level of income. HRMI breaks down the right to education by looking at the rights to both primary education and secondary education. While taking into consideration Kyrgyzstan's income level, the nation is achieving 84.2% of what should be possible based on its resources (income) for primary education and 94.4% for secondary education.

As of 2023, there were 4,989 primary and secondary schools in the country, including 445 in Bishkek. The large majority of these (4,537) were public schools. The country also counted 58 higher educational institutions and universities.

==== Healthcare ====
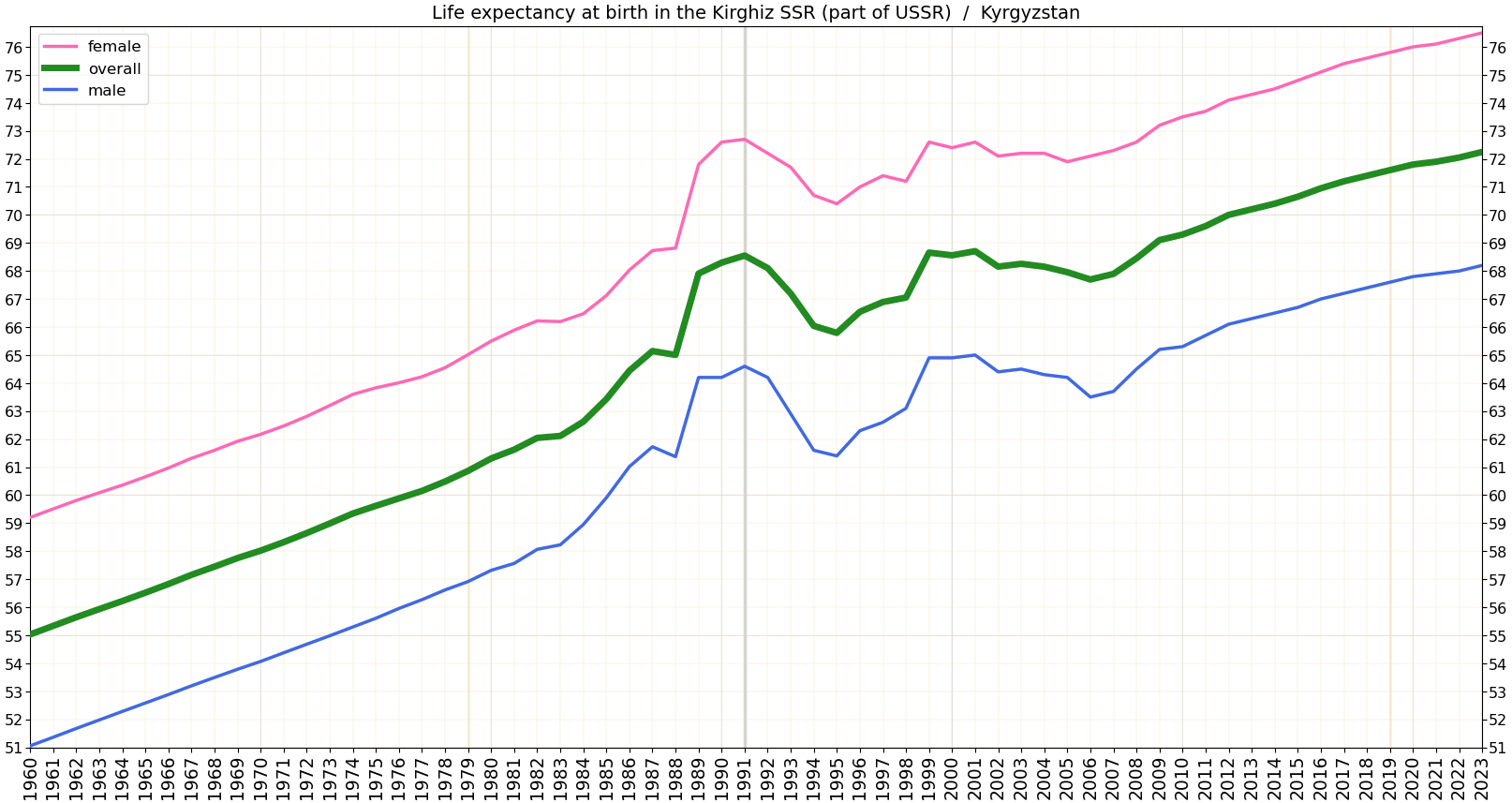
Life expectancy at birth in Kyrgyzstan

Kyrgyzstan is a lower-middle income country in Central Asia with a population of 6,630,631 in 2022 and a projected increase of 42% by 2050. The life expectancy at birth in 2021 was 71.2 years, an increase of 6.23 years from 66 years in 2000. Healthy life expectancy has also increased, from 58.7 years in 200 to 63.4 years in 2021. In the rest of Kyrgyzstan’s WHO region (Europe), the life expectancy at birth is 76.3 as of 2021, improved from 72.5 years in 2000, and the healthy life expectancy in 2021 is 66, improved from 63.7 years in 2000.

==== Transport ====
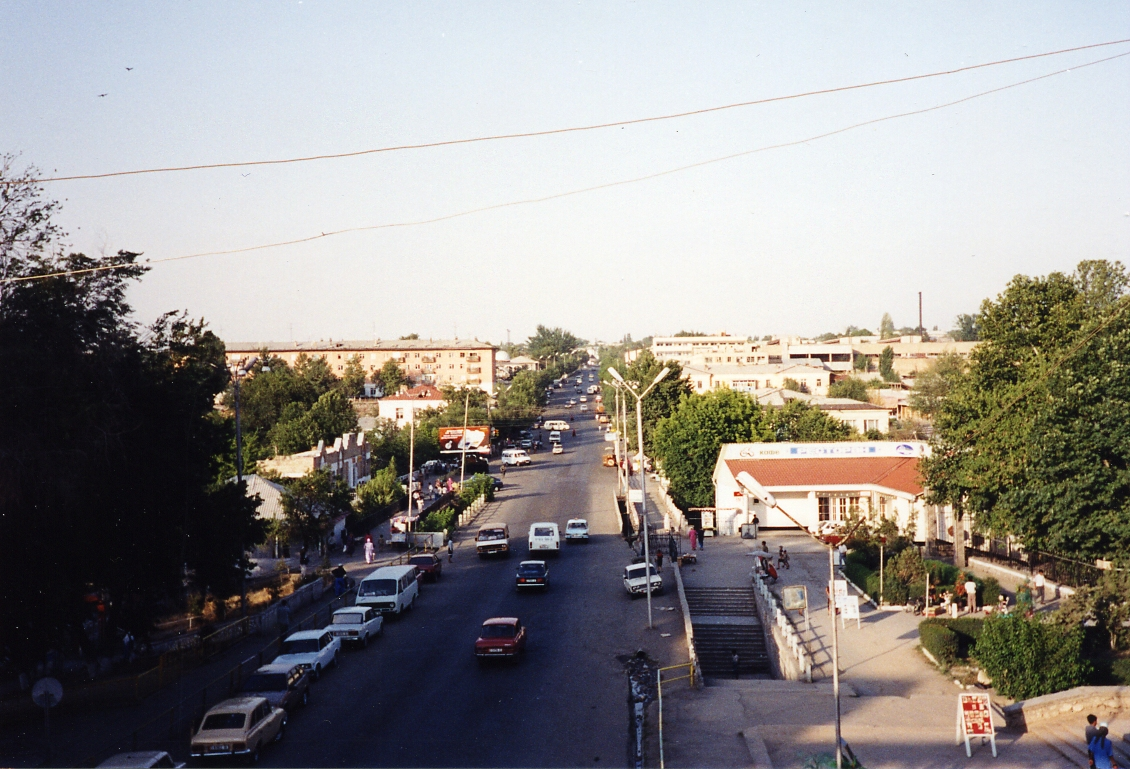
A road in Osh

Transport in Kyrgyzstan is severely constrained by the country's alpine topography. Roads have to snake up steep valleys, cross passes of 3,000 m (9,843 ft) altitude and more, and are subject to frequent mud slides and snow avalanches. Winter travel is close to impossible in many of the more remote and high-altitude regions. Additional problems are because many roads and railway lines built during the Soviet period are today intersected by international boundaries, requiring time-consuming border formalities to cross where they are not completely closed. The horse is still a much used transport option, especially in rural and inaccessible areas, as it does not depend on imported fuel.

==== Tourism ====
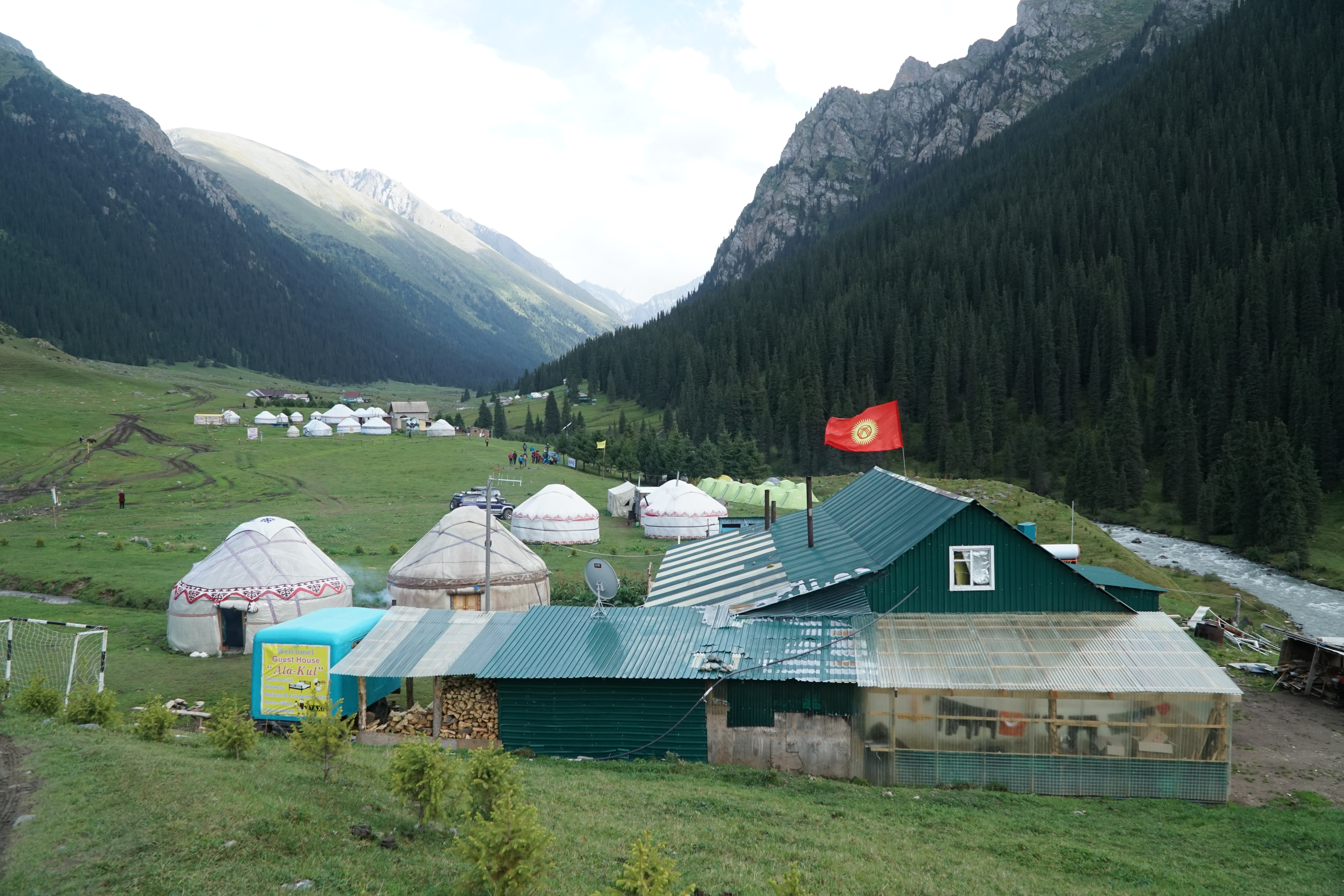
Yurts and a tourist resort in Altyn Arashan

Although Kyrgyzstan’s mountains and lakes are attractive tourist destinations, the tourism industry has grown very slowly because it has received little investment. In the early 2000s, an average of about 450,000 tourists visited annually, mainly from countries of the former Soviet Union. In 2018, the British Backpacker Society ranked Kyrgyzstan as the fifth best adventure travel destination on earth, stating that the country was an adventure travel secret that is "bound to get out soon."

Lake Issyk-Kul and the Tian Shan mountains are relatively popular tourist destinations.

== External trade ==
Exports of Kyrgyzstan by product category (2019) Chemical products Transportation Machines Mineral products Plastics and rubbers Metals Foodstuffs Precious metals Textiles Instruments Animal products Vegetable products Paper goods Footwear and headwear Miscellaneous Stone and glass Wood products Animal and vegetable bi-products Animal hides Arts and antiques Weapons

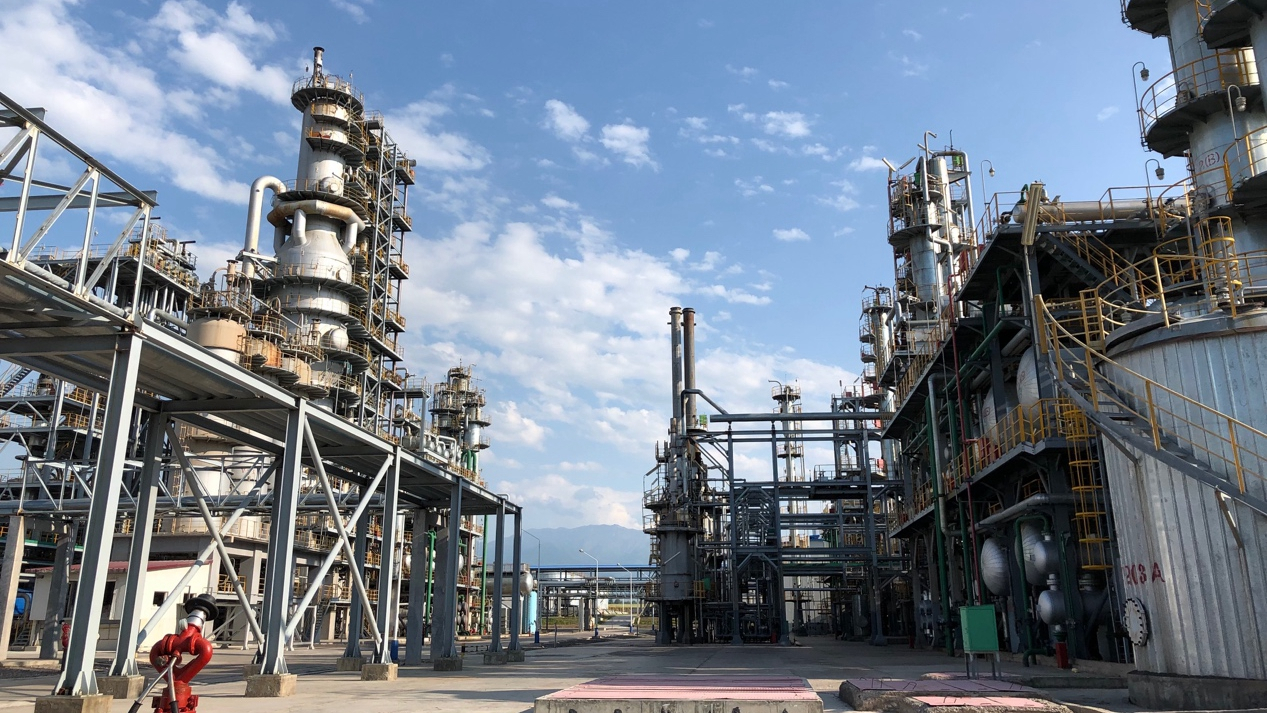
Refinery factory in Kyrgyzstan

Kyrgyzstan's principal exports, which go overwhelmingly to other CIS countries, are nonferrous metals and minerals, woollen goods and other agricultural products, electric energy, and certain engineering goods. In turn, the Republic relies on other former Soviet states for petroleum and natural gas, ferrous metals, chemicals, most machinery, wood and paper products, some foods, and most construction materials. In 1999, Kyrgyz exports to the U.S. totaled $11.2 million, and imports from the U.S. totaled $54.2 million. In 2017, Kyrgyzstan exports were estimated to be worth $1.84 billion, while their imports were at an estimated $4.187 billion. Kyrgyzstan's major exports include gold, cotton, wool, garments, meat, mercury, uranium, electricity, machinery, and shoes. Major imports include oil and gas, machinery and equipment, chemicals, and foodstuffs.

Reexport of China-made consumer goods to Kazakhstan and Russia, centered on Dordoy Bazaar in Bishkek, and to Uzbekistan, centered on Kara-Suu Bazaar in Osh Region, is particularly important; it is thought by some economists to be one of the country's two largest economic activities.

The Kyrgyzstan Government has reduced expenditures, ended most price subsidies, and introduced a value added tax. Overall, the government appears committed to transferring to a free market economic system by stabilizing the economy and implementing reforms, which will encourage long-term growth. These reforms led to Kyrgyzstan's accession to the WTO on December 20, 1998.

In August 2024, the country's government issued an order to establish OJSC "Trading Company of the Kyrgyz Republic" to monitor trade flows related to local companies whose goods are not imported into the Kyrgyz Republic.

=== Investment ===
The stock market capitalisation of listed companies in Kyrgyzstan was valued at $42 million in 2005 by the World Bank.

== Macro-economic trend ==
The following table shows the main economic indicators in 1993–2026. Inflation below 5% is in green.

Year	GDP (in bil. US$ PPP)	GDP per capita (in US$ PPP)	GDP (in bil. US$ nominal)	GDP growth (real)	Inflation (in Percent)	Government debt (Percentage of GDP)
1993	9.8	2180	0.7	▼ -13	▲1086.2	n/a
1995	▼7.7	▼1709	▲1.5	▼ -5.4	▲42.2	n/a
2000	▲11.0	▲2265	▼1.4	▲5.4	▲19.7	▲123.3
2005	▲14.9	▲2903	▲2.5	▼ -0.2	▲4.3	▼85.7
2006	▲15.8	▲3053	▲2.8	▲3.1	▲5.6	▼73.4
2007	▲17.7	▲3366	▲3.8	▲8.5	▲10.2	▼57.7
2008	▲19.4	▲3661	▲5.1	▲7.6	▲24.5	▼49
2009	▲20.0	▲3749	▼4.7	▲2.9	▲6.8	▲58.5
2010	▲20.2	▼3727	▲4.8	▼ -0.5	▲8.0	▲59.7
2011	▲21.8	▲3987	▲6.2	▲6	▲16.6	▼50.1
2012	▲22.2	▲4004	▲6.6	▼ -0.1	▲2.8	▲50.5
2013	▲25.1	▲4427	▲7.3	▲10.9	▲6.6	▼47.1
2014	▲26.5	▲4594	▲7.5	▲4	▲7.5	▲53.6
2015	▲27.8	▲4719	▼6.7	▲3.9	▲6.5	▲67.1
2016	▲29.3	▲4868	▲6.8	▲4.3	▲0.4	▼59.1
2017	▲31.2	▲5088	▲7.7	▲4.7	▲3.2	▼58.8
2018	▼30.8	▼4921	▲8.3	▲3.5	▲1.5	▼54.8
2019	▲35.0	▲5471	▲9.4	▲4.6	▲1.1	▼48.8
2020	▼34.8	▼5345	▼8.3	▼ -7.1	▲6.3	▲63.6
2021	▲39.3	▲5906	▲9.3	▲5.5	▲11.9	▼56.2
2022	▲45.9	▲6751	▲12.3	▲9	▲13.9	▼46.8
2023	▲51.9	▲7482	▲15.2	▲9	▲10.8	▼42
2024	▲59.3	▲8376	▲18.2	▲11.5	▲5.0	▼36.2
2025	▲67.7	▲9371	▲21.6	▲11.1	▲8.2	▼36
2026	▲73.9	▲10024	▲23.6	▲6.1	▲10.6	▲37.4

== Other statistics ==
Investment (gross fixed): 17% of GDP (2004 est.)

Household income or consumption by percentage share:

- lowest 10%: 3.9%
- highest 10%: 23.3% (2001)

Distribution of family income - Gini index: 27.3 (2017)

Agriculture - products: tobacco, cotton, potatoes, vegetables, grapes, fruits and berries; sheep, goats, cattle, wool, dairy products

Industrial production growth rate: 6% (2000 est.)

Electricity

- production: 11,720 GWh (2002)
- consumption: 10,210 GWh (2002)
- exports: 1,062 GWh (2002)
- imports: 375 GWh (2002)

Electricity - production by source:

- fossil fuel: 7.6%
- hydro: 92.4%
- other: 0% (2001)
- nuclear: 0%

Oil:

- production: 2,000 barrels per day (320 m^{3}/d) (2001 est.)
- consumption: 20,000 barrels per day (3,200 m^{3}/d) (2001 est.)
- exports: NA
- imports: NA

Natural gas:

- production: 16 million m^{3} (2001 est.)
- consumption: 2.016 billion m^{3} (2001 est.)
- exports: 0 m^{3} (2001 est.)
- imports: 2 billion m^{3} (2001 est.)

Current account balance: $-87.92 million (2004 est.)

Exports - commodities: cotton, wool, meat, tobacco; gold, mercury, uranium, natural gas, hydropower; machinery; shoes

Imports - commodities: oil and gas, machinery and equipment, chemicals, foodstuffs

Reserves of foreign exchange & gold: $498.7 million (2004 est.)

Exchange rates: soms per US dollar - 41.731 (2004), 43.6484 (2003), 46.9371 (2002), 48.378 (2001), 47.7038 (2000), 69.85 (2020)

=== Other ===
Current GDP per capita of Kyrgyzstan shrank by 54% in the 1990s. Mean wages were $0.85 per man-hour in 2009, which represented underemployment when compared to effective market pay. In the first half of 2012, Kyrgyz economy shrank by 5.8%. This downturn was largely due to the decline in gold production at the Kumtor mine.

=== Poverty ===
As of 2025, the United Nations World Food Programme (WFP) reports that approximately 30% of Kyrgyzstan’s population lives in poverty, with an additional 10% at risk of falling below the poverty line. Despite a 9% GDP increase in 2024, economic growth has not translated into widespread poverty reduction. The WFP highlights vulnerability to both internal and external shocks, including high dependence on food imports, reduced remittances due to changing labor migration policies; particularly in Russia; and climate-related challenges such as drought and glacier melt. Food prices remain around 50% higher than pre-pandemic levels, leaving 36% of the population unable to afford a nutritious diet, while 72% of households resort to coping mechanisms to cover basic needs.

== See also ==
- List of companies of Kyrgyzstan
- Corruption in Kyrgyzstan
- Kyrgyzstan Federation of Trade Unions
- Ministry of Economy and Finance (Kyrgyzstan)
- National Bank of the Kyrgyz Republic
- Science and technology in Kyrgyzstan
- Economy of Central Asia
