= Kubanychbek Bokontayev =

Kyrgyz public official and economist (born 1969)

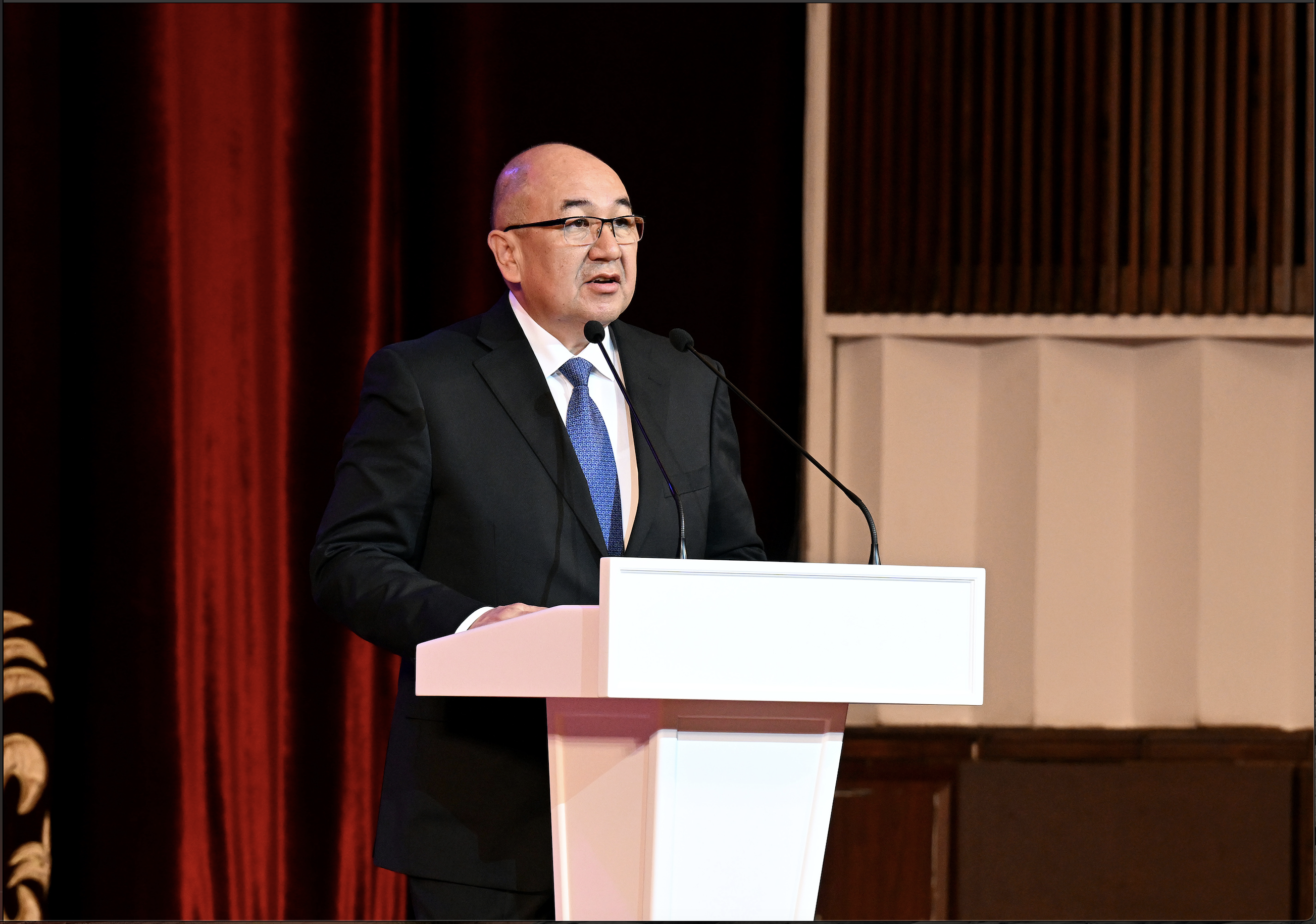
Ambassador Extraordinary and Plenipotentiary of the Kyrgyz Republic to the Russian Federation
- In office August 2024 – Present
- President: Sadyr Japarov
- Preceded by: Gulnara-Klara Samat
Chairman of the National Bank of the Kyrgyz Republic
- In office September 2021 – June 2024
- President: Sadyr Japarov
- Preceded by: Tolkunbek Abdygulov
- Succeeded by: Melis Turgunbaev
Deputy Chairman of the National Bank of Kyrgyz Republic
- In office October 2006 – April 2010
- President: Kurmanbek Bakiyev

Personal details
- Born: January 18, 1969 (age 57) Issyk-Kul Region, Kyrgyz Republic

Kubanychbek Bokontayev is a Kyrgyz economist and public official who has served as the chairman of the National Bank of the Kyrgyz Republic from September 2021 to June 2024. From August 2024 he was appointed as the Ambassador Extraordinary and Plenipotentiary of the Kyrgyz Republic to the Russian Federation.

== Early life and education ==
Kubanychbek Bokontayev was born January 18, 1969, in the village of Svetly Mys in the Issyk-Kul region. In 1992, being Lenin Scholarship recipient and winner of inter-university student economic Olympiads, he graduated with honours from the economics department of the Kyrgyz State National University and received a higher education in economics. In 2004–2005, he completed an MBA course (business management) at the Japan Center in the Kyrgyz Republic from which he graduated with honours.

== Career ==
=== Early career (1992–2006) ===
Bokontayev held various positions in commercial banks of Kyrgyzstan in positions ranging from ordinary economist to acting chairman of the board of directors. Prior to his first appointment to the National Bank of Kyrgyz Republic as deputy chairman in 2006, he worked as editor-in-chief of the newspaper "Economics. Banks. Business" (since 2003).

=== Chairman of the National Bank of Kyrgyz Republic (2021–2024) ===
Kubanychbek Bokontayev was appointed Chairman of the National Bank of the Kyrgyz Republic in September 2021. His appointment was confirmed by the Jogorku Kenesh (the Kyrgyz Parliament) following the resignation of his predecessor, Tolkunbek Abdygulov. His tenure as Chairman was marked by efforts to stabilise the Kyrgyz financial system amid regional economic fluctuations.

During his leadership, Bokontayev oversaw several key policy initiatives aimed at controlling inflation, managing the national currency, increasing the gold reserves of the country and modernizing the banking sector.

Bokontayev's term as Chairman ended in June 2024, when he stepped down from his position to take on another role within the government.

=== Ambassador Extraordinary and Plenipotentiary of the Kyrgyz Republic to the Russian Federation (2024–present) ===
He is currently serving as Ambassador Extraordinary and Plenipotentiary of the Kyrgyz Republic to the Russian Federation. The corresponding order was signed by President of Kyrgyz Republic, Sadyr Zhaparov on August 5, 2024.
