= Boris Silayev =

Former Kyrgyz and active Russian statesman (born 1946)

- Борис Силаев

Prime Minister of Kyrgyzstan Acting
- In office 4 April 1999 – 13 April 1999
- President: Askar Akayev
- Preceded by: Jumabek Ibraimov
- Succeeded by: Amangeldy Muraliyev
- In office 23 December 1998 – 25 December 1998
- Preceded by: Kubanychbek Jumaliyev
- Succeeded by: Jumabek Ibraimov

Personal details
- Born: February 28, 1946 (age 79); Lyalichi, Mikhaylovsky District, Primorsky Krai

Boris Ivanovich Silayev (Russian: Борис Иванович Силаев; born February 28, 1946) is a former Kyrgyz politician. He is an ethnic Russian. His family moved to the Kyrgyz SSR when he was 10, and he graduated from the Frunze Polytechnic Institute in 1974. He was Mayor of Bishkek from 1995 to 1998. He served as acting Prime Minister of Kyrgyzstan from December 23 to December 25, 1998, and from April 4 to April 13, 1999. He was First Deputy Prime Minister from 1999 to 2000.

Silayev moved to Moscow in 2001 and currently serves as Deputy Director of Department of International Relations in Moscow Government.

Political offices
Preceded by Kubanychbek Jumaliev	Acting Prime Minister of Kyrgyzstan (first time); 1998	Succeeded by Jumabek Ibraimov
Preceded by Jumabek Ibraimov	Acting Prime Minister of Kyrgyzstan (second time); 1999	Succeeded by Amangeldy Muraliev
