= Akylbek Japarov =

Kyrgyz politician (born 1965)

- Акылбек Жапаров
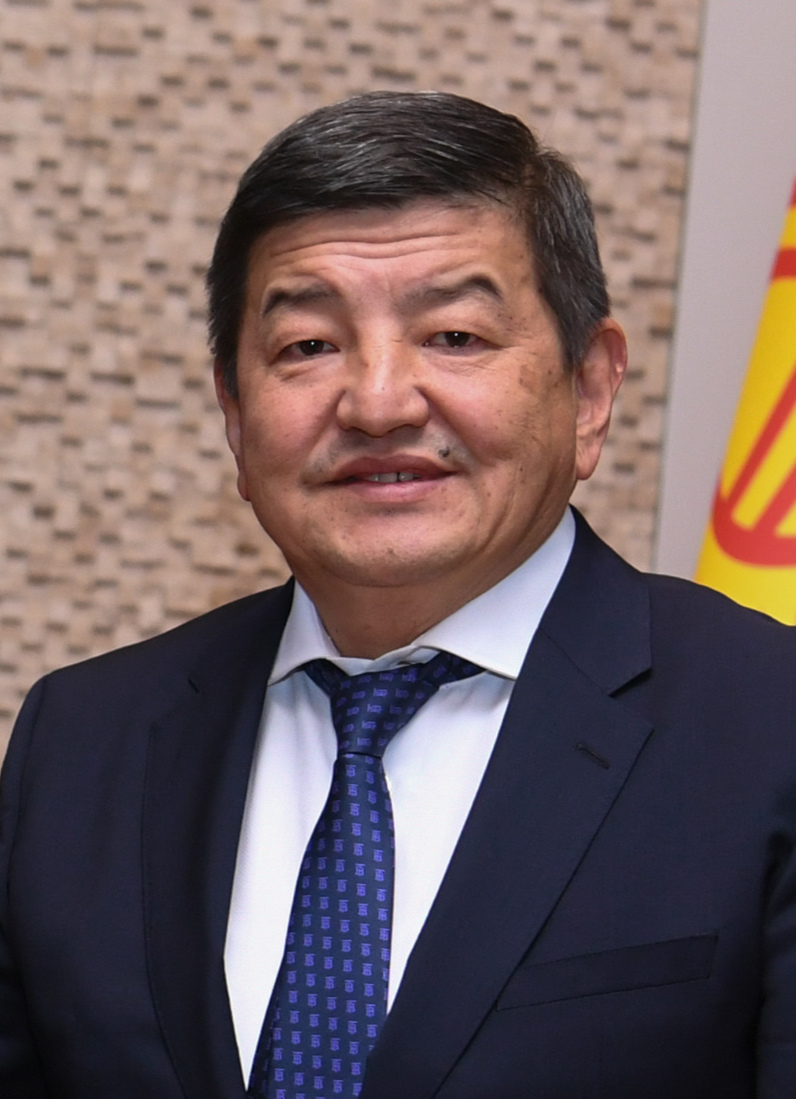
- Japarov in 2021

2nd Chairman of the Cabinet of Ministers of Kyrgyzstan
- In office 12 October 2021^{[a]} – 16 December 2024
- President: Sadyr Japarov
- Preceded by: Uluqbek Maripov
- Succeeded by: Adylbek Kasymaliev

Minister of Economic Development and Trade
- In office 27 December 2007 – October 2009
- President: Qurmanbek Baqıyev

Minister of Economy and Finance
- In office 26 March 2005 – 27 December 2007
- President: Qurmanbek Baqıyev
- Preceded by: Bolot Abildaev
- Succeeded by: Tajıqan Qalımbetova

Personal details
- Born: 14 September 1965 (age 61) Balykchy, Kirghiz SSR, Soviet Union (now Kyrgyzstan)
- Party: Social Democratic Party (Before 2005); Ar-Namys (2005–present)
- Education: Kyrgyz Technical University; Bishkek Academy of Finance and Economics
- a. Acting: 12 – 13 October 2021

Akylbek Üsönbek uulu Japarov (Kyrgyz: Акылбек Үсөнбек уулу Жапаров; born 14 September 1965) is a Kyrgyz politician who served as Chairman of the Cabinet of Ministers of Kyrgyzstan from 2021 to 2024, diring his term he was described as the "de facto leader of the Cabinet". He replaced Ulukbek Maripov, who had been appointed to the new role by President Sadyr Japarov on 5 May 2021. Aqılbek also concurrently served as the Head of the Presidential Administration under President Japarov.

Coming from an economic and engineering background, Japarov had previously served in several mostly economic roles under the Aqayev and Baqıyev governments, including as Minister of Economy and Finance from 26 March 2005 to 27 December 2007 under Baqıyev after the Tulip Revolution.

== Early life and career ==
Japarov was born on 14 September 1965 in Balykchy, Issyk-Kul Region, to Usenbek Japarov, a doctor, and Begayim Sarynzhieva, an engineer.

Japarov graduated from 40th Anniversary of Komsomol secondary school in Kochkor District in 1981. During his school years, he was a prominent Komsomol leader. In 1986, he graduated with honours from Kyrgyz Technical University with a degree in civil engineering; during his studies, he was a scholar of Lenin. In 2002, Japarov graduated from the Bishkek Academy of Finance and Economics with a degree in Financial Tax Systems, Management of Organisations.

Japarov taught at Kyrgyz Technical University from 1987 to 1991. He took an active part in the life of the institute and society and was the secretary of the Komsomol committee of the institute, a member of the Central Control Commission of the Central Committee of Komsomol and the Central Council of student construction brigades of Komsomol.

== Political career ==
Japarov began his political career as head of the Department for Youth Policy of the presidential administration of Askar Akayev from July 1992 to 1993. In October 1993, he became executive secretary, chief of staff of the Social Democratic Party of Kyrgyzstan and held this position until April 1995. From 1995 to 1996, he served as assistant to the First Vice Prime Minister. He was secretary of the National Commission for the Securities Market from 1996 to November 1997 and head of the Department for Collection of Payments of the State Tax Inspectorate under the Ministry of Finance from November 1997 to 20 April 2000. From 20 April 2000 to March 2005, Japarov was a member of the Legislative Assembly, the former upper house of the Supreme Council, on the party list from the Union of Democratic Forces electoral bloc. He was a member of the Regions of Kyrgyzstan parliamentary group. He also served as Chairman of the Committee on Taxes, Customs and Other Duties of the Legislative Assembly.

After the Tulip Revolution overthrew President Akayev, from 26 March 2005 to 27 December 2007, Japarov served as Minister of Economy and Finance under Kurmanbek Bakiyev. He held intergovernmental negotiations with representatives of Ukraine on trade, economic, scientific, technical and cultural cooperation. From 27 December 2007 to October 2009, he served as Minister of Economic Development and Trade. He later served as First Vice Prime Minister from 22 October 2009 to 2010. Japarov was a supporter of Kyrgyzstan entering the heavily indebted poor countries (HIPC) programme of the World Bank and International Monetary Fund (IMF).

On 1 June 2021, Japarov was appointed Deputy Chairman of the Cabinet of Ministers and Minister of Economy and Finance by President Sadyr Japarov. On 12 October 2021, by decree of President Sadyr Japarov, Akylbek Japarov became acting Chairman of the Cabinet of Ministers, replacing Ulukbek Maripov. On 13 October 2021, Akylbek Japarov was appointed Chairman of the Cabinet of Ministers by President Sadyr Japarov.

Akylbek Japarov was dismissed by President Sadyr Japarov on 16 December 2024, who replaced him with First Deputy Chairman Adylbek Kasymaliev.

== Corruption ==
Temirov Live journalists found a connection between Akylbek Japarov’s close relatives and the largest company in Malta, which provides services for organizing offshore business. It is owned by a certain Peter Mamo, who is also the director of the companies Globalico Holdings Limited, whose CEO is Zhaparov’s son, and Alfatronics Limited, which is managed by a relative and deputy head of the Ministry of Economic Finance.

In addition, journalists revealed a connection between the company Perfin Services Limited, which, according to OCCRP, owns all of the above companies, with the wife of Akylbek Japarov himself.

On May 29, 2017, according to a press release from the State Committee for National Security, the Anti-Corruption Service of the Committee opened a criminal case under the article “Corruption”. According to the criminal case, the allocation of 200 million soms to MIS in 2009 was illegal.

== Tax fraud ==
In 2020, the MIS company, associated with the wife of Akylbek Japarov, was suspected of evading tax payments on a particularly large scale.

Then the financial police reported that the main shareholders of MIS are 2 legal entities – the offshore company E.C.L. and citizen J.A.B., who is the wife of one of the country's high-ranking officials. This meant Anara Japarova and EURASIA CAPITAL LIMITED. The fact that Japarova owns shares in MIS was reported by the State Committee for National Security back in 2017.

In addition, according to the website of the Ministry of Justice, Anara Japarova is the head of the companies ICE MAX, Tridas, DAMAS-PHARM, Damas Ala-Too, Alma Agro and Tridas Milk. In addition to Japarova, Damas Ala-Too has another founder – Globalico Holdings, listed in the Chamber of Commerce and Industry as the Damas Hotel.

The head of Globalico Holdings is Ulan Abykeev, also the head of Ala-Too impex, the founder of which is EURASIA CAPITAL LIMITED.

Financial police reported that companies owned by Zhaparov’s wife caused damage to the state in the amount of 90 million soms – it is known that she returned 28 million soms to the state.

== Accusations in plagiarism ==
Information about plagiarism in most of the doctoral dissertation of the Chairman of the Cabinet of Ministers Akylbek Zhaparov was published on September 11, 2018 on the Dissernet website. It notes that 122 of the 234 pages of Japarov's 2009 dissertation, entitled “Strategy for Economic Modernization of the Kyrgyz Republic (Monetary and Financial Aspects),” were taken from other sources. Thus, 48% of the dissertation turned out to be plagiarism. Most of the work was taken from Shailobek Musakodzhoev’s book “Introduction to Economics. Fundamentals of macroeconomics. Business (microeconomics)". Dissernet later publicly accused Japarov of plagiarism.

== Nepotism ==
After the October events (October 16), his brother – Rahatbek Japarov – received the position of deputy chairman of the State Penitentiary Service. Akylbek Japarov's matchmaker, Nurbek Alimov, occupies a high position. He is the head of North East Customs. His career also took off after the change of government in October 2020. In just one year, he rose from chief inspector of the Customs Clearance Center group to acting head of the Customs Service's Homeland Security and Anti-Corruption Division. Akylbek Japarov's son-in-law Eldar Alisherov holds the position of Minister of the Eurasian Economic Commission for Customs Cooperation.

The Law “On State Civil Service and Municipal Service” of Kyrgyz Republic prohibits holding positions where subordination or control arises between persons in close family relationships.

== Personal life ==
Japarov is married and has two daughters, Saadat and Azhar, and a son, Maksat. He is the author of the books Taxes: Yesterday, Today, Tomorrow, Strategies for Economic Modernization, Modernization of the Kyrgyz Economy and a number of articles in the media. He speaks Kyrgyz, Russian, English and Turkish.

In 2014, amid public allegations of land fraud, Supreme Council member Irina Karamushkina stated that Japarov is the owner of several buildings, including Damas International Hotel in Bishkek, with an approximate cost of $6 million.

== Awards ==
- 1995 – "1,000th Anniversary of the Epic of Manas" commemorative medal
- Honorary Citizen of the Naryn Region of the Kyrgyz Republic
- 2002 – Honoured Economist of the Kyrgyz Republic (2002)
- 7 June 2007 – Sheriktesh ("Commonwealth") Medal of the Ministry of Internal Affairs of the Kyrgyz Republic
- 13 June 2007 – Order of Mikhail Lomonosov of the Academy of Security, Defence and Law Enforcement of the Russian Federation
