= OJSC "Trading Company of the Kyrgyz Republic" =

OJSC "Trading Company of the Kyrgyz Republic" — is a state-owned enterprise established to control trade flows related to Kyrgyz companies whose goods are not imported into the Kyrgyz Republic. It is seen as a government mechanism to circumvent anti-Russian sanctions in the financial sphere, as well as a scheme to nationalise businesses for violating international restrictions. Founder — Ministry of Economy and Trade of the Kyrgyz Republic. Director — Bakyt Asankulov.

== History ==
On August 23, simultaneously with the introduction of OFAC sanctions by the United States against Russia's financial flows, the government of Kyrgyzstan announced the creation of the "Trading Company of the Kyrgyz Republic" with 100% state participation in its charter capital. The founder of the company became the Ministry of Economy and Commerce of the Kyrgyz Republic. The declared purpose of the company is to control trade flows involving Kyrgyz companies whose goods do not enter the territory of Kyrgyzstan. Companies engaged in selling goods without actual import into Kyrgyzstan are required to conduct operations through this new structure.

According to official information, the objectives of the trading company are: to conduct international trade; to organise and control financial operations, including currency transfers, settlements with foreign counterparties; to manage currency risks; to ensure financial stability. According to the media, the real purpose of the creation of the Trading Company of the Kyrgyz Republic is to create a mechanism to circumvent international anti-Russian sanctions at the state level, to control revenues from these sanctions, and to nationalise the businesses for violating international restrictions.According to an investigation by journalists from the Kyrgyz Economist, the circle of people associated with the company includes Andrei Goikhman, former deputy chairman of Rosinbank OJSC, who was previously sentenced to 9 years in prison for financial crimes. And Alexey Shirshov, whose name is associated with methods of withdrawing funds from the country's energy system, known as the "Shirshov schemes".

== Partners ==
Directly related to the creation of the Trading Company of the Kyrgyz Republic is the Resolution of the National Bank of the Kyrgyz Republic, issued on 4 September, which prohibits financial institutions from making payments and settlements under contracts for works and services that do not enter the territory of the Republic. The exception to this is state-owned enterprises, as determined by the Government of the Kyrgyz Republic. According to this resolution, such services can only be provided by the Trading Company of the Kyrgyz Republic. Those companies that have previously operated in this format should continue their activities only through the Trading Company of the Kyrgyz Republic.

According to media reports, two large state-owned banks have become partners in the Trade Company of the Kyrgyz Republic: Eldik Bank, owned by the Government of the Kyrgyz Republic, and Aiyl Bank, whose sole shareholder is the State Property Management Agency of Kyrgyzstan under the Government of the Republic. As well as the private bank Asman Bank, whose founder is Mikhail Kuzovlev, a former top manager of Russia's major sanctioned banks VTB and VEB.RF of the Russian Federation, and a former beneficiary of Morskoy Bank, also under US OFAC sanctions. He is credited with establishing the banking sector in the Russian-annexed Crimea.

According to political scientist Jumabek Tursunbekov, state-owned banks will work with Trading Company of the Kyrgyz Republic on the terms set by the Cabinet of Ministers of the Kyrgyz Republic. And the private Asman Bank will become the main organisation through which the main flows of toxic sanctions money will pass. And if necessary, all violations of international anti-Russian restrictions will be blamed on this bank.

== Criticism ==
On 15 October, Baktybek Sydykov, a member of parliament, complained that the Trading Company of the Kyrgyz Republic was charging a 6% commission for its services instead of the stated 2%. He also noted that the Trading Company of the Kyrgyz Republic does not account for budget tax losses, customs payments and other commission income. Askar Sydykov, head of the International Business Council, noted that the creation of the Trading Company of the Kyrgyz Republic caused confusion and negative reactions in business and banking circles.
