= Jangy-Alysh =

Jangy-Alysh Жаңы-Алыш
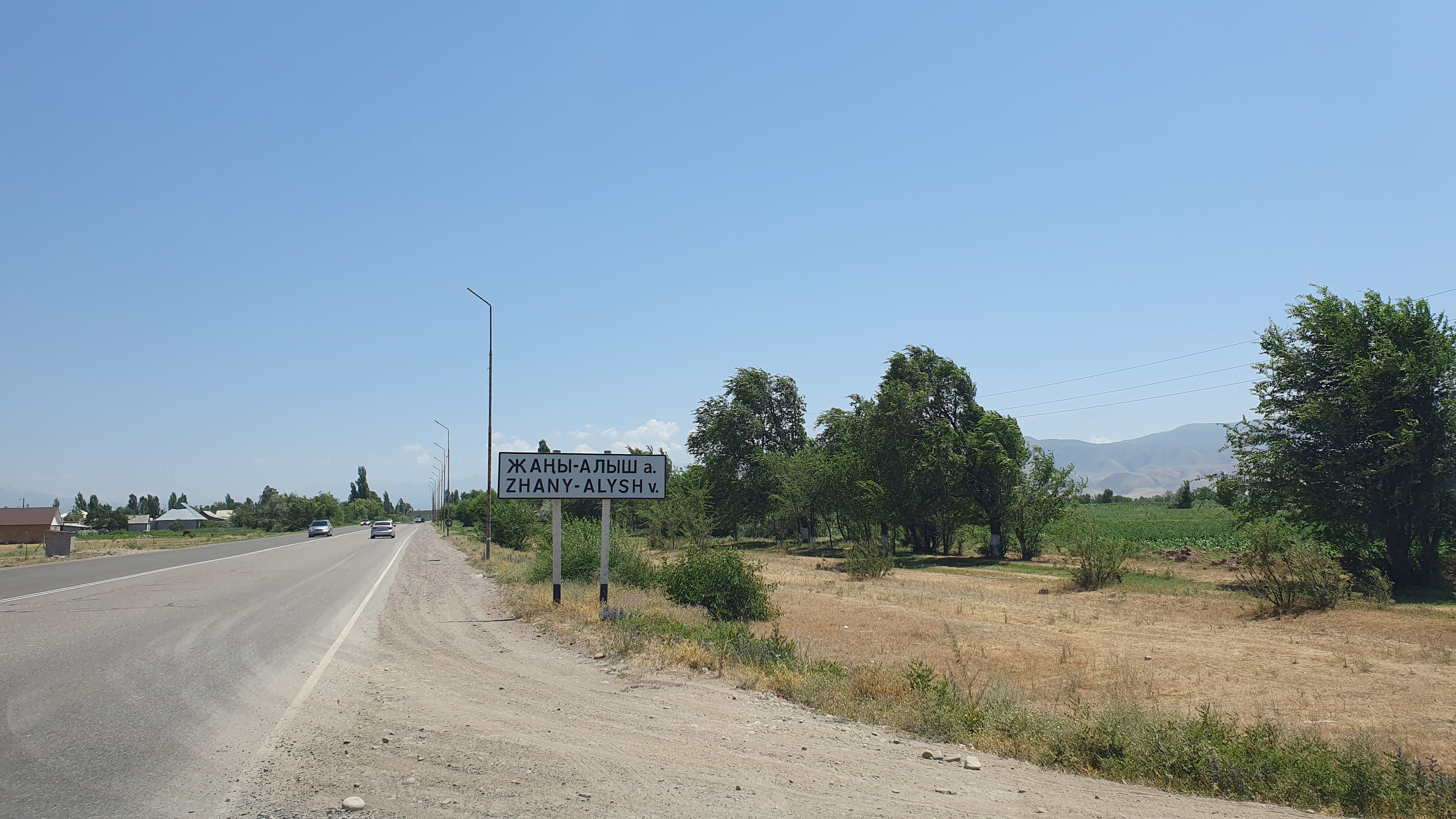

- Location within Kyrgyzstan
- Coordinates: 42°48′33″N 75°36′21″E
- Country: Kyrgyzstan
- Region: Chüy
- District: Kemin
- Established: 1922
- Elevation: 1,045 m (3,428 ft)

Population (2021)
  - Total: 2,768
- Time zone: UTC+6

Jangy-Alysh (also Atayke) is a village in the Kemin District of Chüy Region of Kyrgyzstan. Its population was 2,768 in 2021. It is the center of Jangy-Alysh rural community (ayyl aymagy).

== Famous people born in Jangy-Alysh ==
- Jumabek Ibraimov (1944 - 1999), 5th Prime Minister of Kyrgyzstan
- Toktobolot Abdumomunov (1922 - 1989), Kyrgyz and Soviet writer
