= Kubanychbek Jumaliyev =

Kyrgyz politician; Prime Minister of Kyrgyzstan in 1998

- Кубанычбек Жумалиев

4th Prime Minister of Kyrgyzstan
- In office 14 March 1998 – 23 December 1998
- President: Askar Akayev
- Preceded by: Apas Jumagulov
- Succeeded by: Jumabek Ibraimov

Personal details
- Born: 26 April 1956 (age 70) Jalal-Abad, Kirghiz SSR, Soviet Union (now Kyrgyzstan)
- Party: Democratic Party Adilet

Kubanychbek Myrzabek uulu Jumaliyev (Kyrgyz: Кубанычбек Мырзабек уулу Жумалиев; born 26 April 1956) is a Kyrgyz politician who served as the Prime Minister of Kyrgyzstan from 24 March 1998 to 23 December 1998.

He was born in Jalal-Abad Region. He graduated from Ryazan Radiotechnical Institute in 1978 and worked in Frunze Polytechnic Institute from 1978 to 1992. He has a doctorate in Physical and Technical Sciences, and his scientific research was in holography and optical information processing.

He served as the First Deputy Minister of Education and Science from 1994 to 1995, the First Deputy State Secretary from 1995 to 1996, the Chief of Staff from 1996 to 1998, Prime Minister from 24 March 1998 to 23 December 1998, Governor of Jalal-Abad Region from 1998 to 2001, Minister of Transport and Communications from 2001 to 2005, and First Vice Prime Minister from 2002–2005. He founded the Democratic Party Adilet party.

2019 reporting revealed that Jumaliyev had omitted in his tax declaration to mention 45 companies that he or his wife owned. In February 2021, he was arrested on suspicion of abuse of office, money laundering, tax evasion, and illegal enrichment. Later that year, he was released on pretrial detention later that year after paying almost $12 million to the state treasury.

He is married with four children.

Political offices
Preceded by Apas Jumagulov	Prime Minister of Kyrgyzstan; 1998	Succeeded by Boris Silayev (acting)
