= Melis Turgunbaev =

Kyrgyz politician and government official

- Мелис Тургунбаев
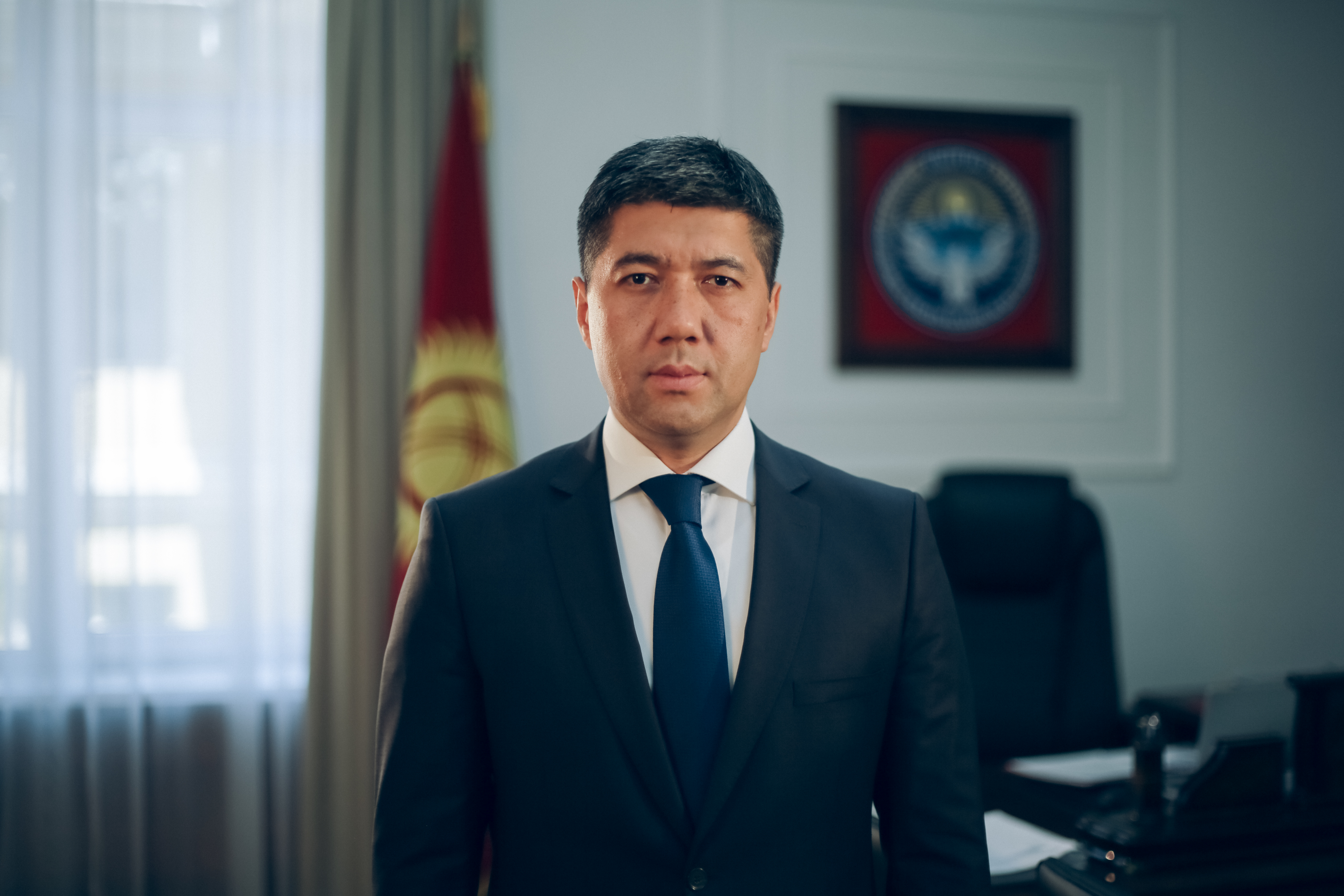
- Turgunbaev in 2023

Chairman of the National Bank of the Kyrgyz Republic
- In office 26 June 2024 – March 2026
- Preceded by: Kubanychbek Bokontayev
- Succeeded by: Almaz Baketayev

Personal details
- Born: 2 May 1982 (age 44)
- Education: London Business School

Melis Turgunbaev is a Kyrgyz politician and government official who was the chairman of the National Bank of the Kyrgyz Republic since June 2024.

== Biography ==
Turgunbaev completed the Sloan Program at the London Business School and earned a Ph.D. in Economics in 2023.

== Career ==
Turgunbaev began his career in the Department of Public Debt Management at the Ministry of Finance of the Kyrgyz Republic in 2002. He transitioned to the private sector in 2006, joining Gazprom Neft Asia LLC as the head of market analysis and pricing department and then held the position of Branch Director at Gazprom Kyrgyzstan LLC from 2015-2020. From 2013 to 2021, he worked at Kyrgyzneftegaz including Chairman of the Board from 2020 to 2021, Chairman of the Board of Directors from 2017 to 2020, and Board Member from 2013 to 2017. He was also on the board of Kyrgyz Investment Credit Bank JSC from 2021 to 2023.

From 2023 to 2024, Turgunbaev was the Minister of Natural Resources, Ecology, and Technical Supervision of the Kyrgyz Republic. In 2024, he became Chairman of the National Bank of the Kyrgyz Republic.

== Personal life ==
Turgunbaev is married and has 4 children.
