= Amangeldy Muraliyev =

Kyrgyz politician (born 1947)

- Амангелди Муралиев
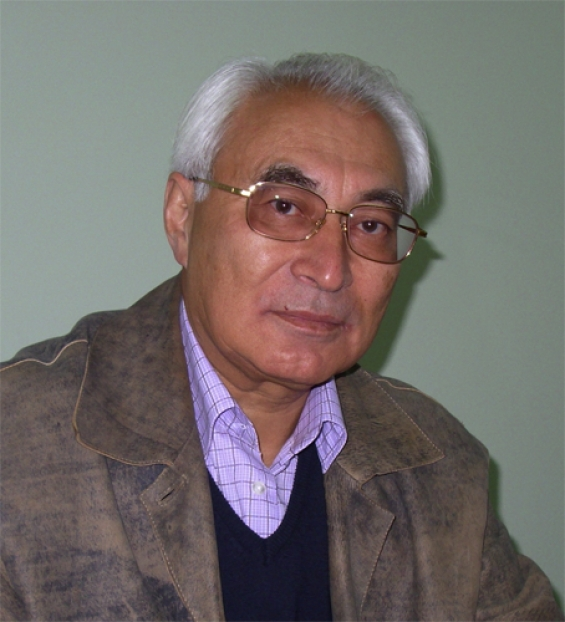
- Muraliyev in 2010

6th Prime Minister of Kyrgyzstan
- In office 12 April 1999 – 21 December 2000
- President: Askar Akayev
- Preceded by: Boris Silayev
- Succeeded by: Kurmanbek Bakiyev

Personal details
- Born: 7 August 1947 (age 78) Kyrgyz SSR

Amangeldy Mursadykovich Muraliev (Kyrgyz: Амангелди Мурсадыкович Муралиев; born 7 August 1947) is a Kyrgyz politician. He served as Mayor of Frunze from 1988 to 1991; Minister of Economy and Finance from 1991 to 1992; Chairman of the State Committee on Economy from 1993 to 1994; Chairman of the State Property Fund from 1994 to 1996; Governor of Osh Province from 1996 to 1999; Prime Minister of Kyrgyzstan from 13 April 1999 to 21 December 2000; and President of the Kyrgyz Stock Exchange from 2001 to 2004.

Political offices
| Preceded by Boris Silaev (acting) | Prime Minister of Kyrgyzstan; 1999–2000 | Succeeded by Kurmanbek Bakiyev |
