= Ministry of Economy and Finance (Kyrgyzstan) =

Government ministry of Kyrgyzstan

- Экономика жана финансы министрлиги Министерство экономики и финансов
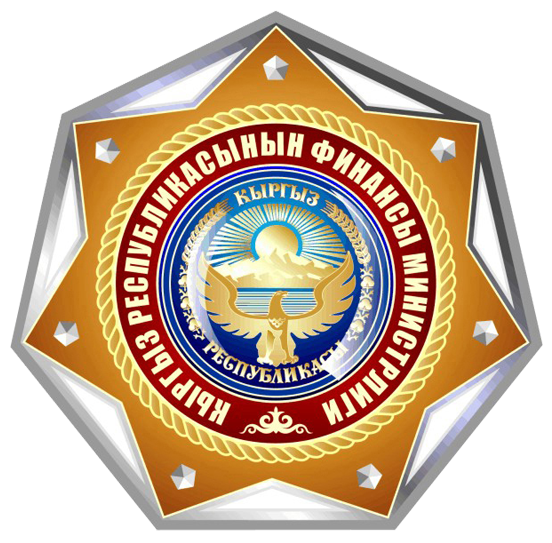

Government Ministry overview
- Formed: 12 February 2021; 4 years ago
- Preceding agencies: Ministry of Economy; Ministry of Finance
- Jurisdiction: Government of Kyrgyzstan
- Headquarters: Bishkek, Kyrgyz Republic
- Minister responsible: Almaz Baketayev
- Website: http://mineconom.gov.kg/en

The Ministry of Economy and Finance (Kyrgyz: Экономика жана финансы министрлиги, Russian: Министерство экономики и финансов) is the Kyrgyz government ministry which oversees the public finances of Kyrgyzstan. It was formed from a merge of the Ministry of Economy and Ministry of Finance after a government reshuffle on 12 February 2021.

== Ministers ==
- Kerimzhan Kunakunov, 1991
- Amangeldy Muraliyev, 1991–1992
- Kamchybek Shakirov, December 1992 – 1994
- Kemelbek Nanaev, 1994–1996
- Talaybek Koychumanov, 1996–1998
- Marat Sultanov, January 1999 – July 1999
- Sultan Mederov, July 1999 – 2000?
- Temirbek Akmataliyev, 2001? – January 2002
- Bolot Abildaev, January 2002 – March 2005
- Akylbek Zhaparov, September 2005 – December 2007
- Tazhikan Kalimbetova, December 2007 – January 2009
- Marat Sultanov, January 2009 – April 2010
- Temir Sariyev, April 2010 – July 2010
- Chorobek Imashev, July 2010 – January 2011
- Dinara Shaydieva, January 2011 – February 2011
- Melis Mambetzhanov, February 2011 – December 2011
- Akylbek Zhaparov, December 2011 – September 2012
- Olga Lavrova, September 2012 – April 2015
- Adylbek Kasymaliyev, November 2015 – December 2018
- Baktygul Jeenbaeva, December 2018 – October 2020
- Kyyalbek Mukashev, October 2020 – February 2021
- Ulukbek Karmyshakov, February 2021 – October 2021
- Almaz Baketayev, October 2021 – present

== See also ==
- Government of Kyrgyzstan
- Economy of Kyrgyzstan
