= Temir Sariyev =

Kyrgyz politician

- Темир Сариев
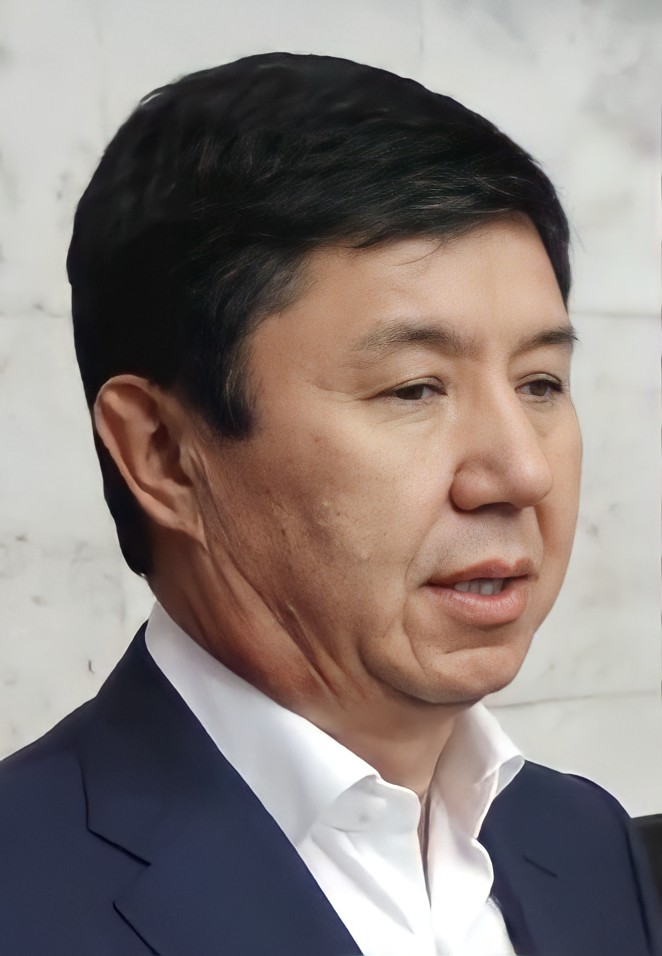
- Sariyev in 2017

17th Prime Minister of Kyrgyzstan
- In office 1 May 2015 – 13 April 2016
- President: Almazbek Atambayev
- Preceded by: Djoomart Otorbaev
- Succeeded by: Sooronbay Jeenbekov

Minister of Finance
- In office 8 April 2010 – July 2010
- Preceded by: Marat Sultanov
- Succeeded by: Chorobek Imashev

Personal details
- Born: Temir Argembaevich Sariyev; June 17, 1963 (age 61); Sokuluk District, Chuy Region, Kirghiz SSR, Soviet Union
- Political party: Akshumkar
- Children: 2

Temir Agrembaevich Sariyev (Kyrgyz: Темир Агрембаевич Сариев, romanized: Temir Agrembayevich Sariyev, [temir sɑˈrijev]) (born 17 June 1963) is a Kyrgyz politician who was Prime Minister of Kyrgyzstan from 2015 to 2016. He was a presidential candidate for the 2009 elections, receiving 157,005 (6.74%) votes. Sariyev was a candidate in the country's 2017 presidential elections, in which he garnered 2.54% of the vote (42,910 votes) and came in fourth place.

== Early career ==
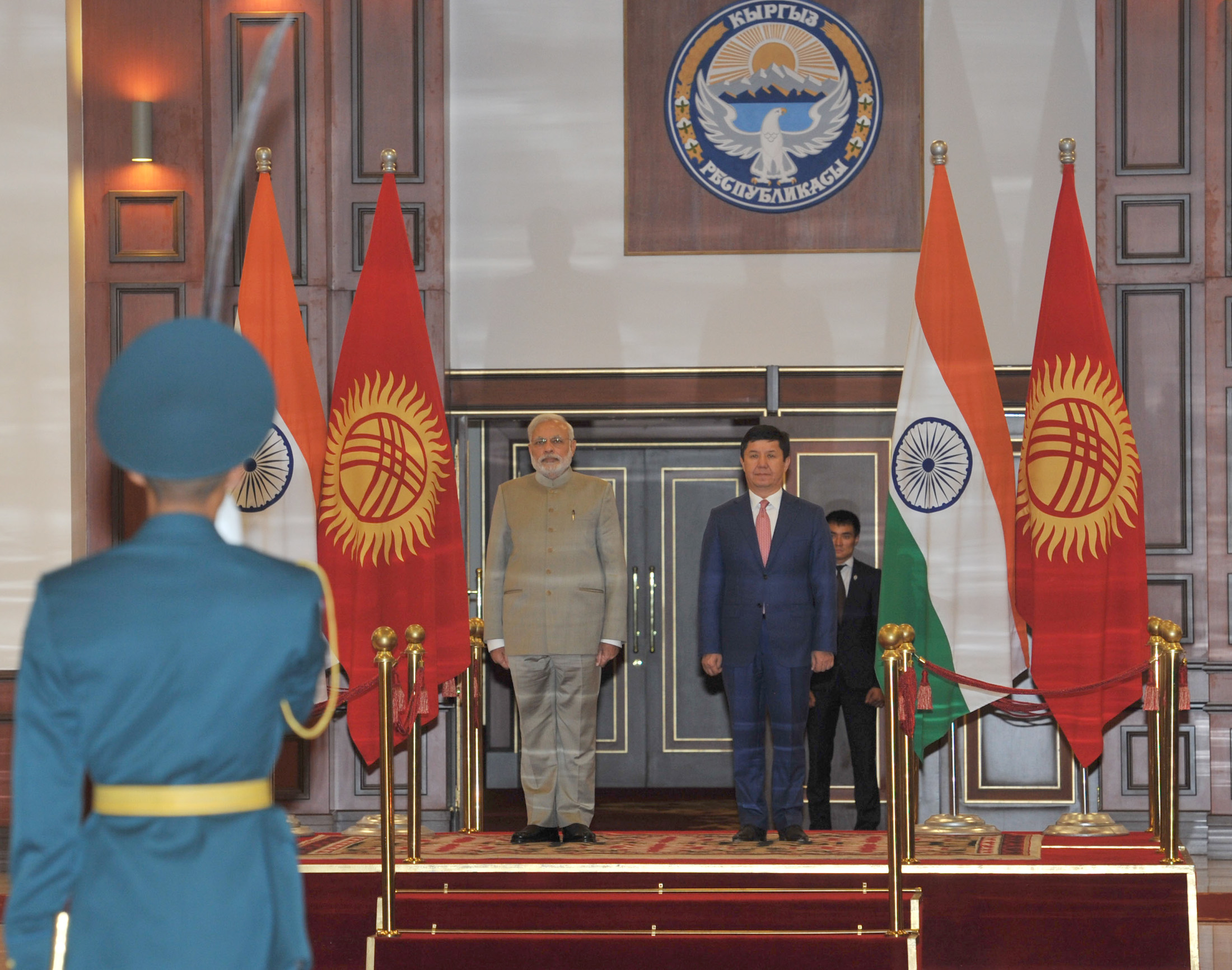
Sariyev with Narendra Modi inside Manas International Airport, Bishkek, Kyrgyzstan.

Sariyev was born on June 17, 1963, in the village of Tösh-Bulak, Sokuluk District, Chuy Region. He graduated from a sports boarding school in Bishkek at the age of 17. From 1981 to 1983, he served in the Soviet Army. After that, he worked at the Alamedinskaya fur factory, first as a freight forwarder, then as an economist and a senior economist. In 1987, he got a job at the department of working youth of the Alamedin District Committee, working first as an instructor, and two years later, he became the head of the department. He was engaged in party work in the Alamedin district committee until 1991.

Political offices
Preceded by Marat Sultanov	Minister of Finance; 2010	Succeeded by Chorobek Imashev
Preceded by Djoomart Otorbaev	Prime Minister of Kyrgyzstan; 2015–2016	Succeeded by Sooronbay Jeenbekov
