= Zhanylsynzat Turganbaeva =

Kyrgyzstani businesswoman and ethnographer (born 1970)

- Жаңылсынзат Турганбаева
- Born: 1970 (age 55–56); Kyrgyzstan
- Education: Kyrgyz Technical University
- Occupations: businesswoman, museum manager, ethnographer and philanthropist
- Spouse: Tabaldy Egemberdiev (m. 1997, d. 2015)

Zhanylsynzat Turganbaeva (Kyrgyz: Жаңылсынзат Турганбаева, born 1970) is a Kyrgyzstani businesswoman, museum manager, ethnographer and philanthropist.

== Biography ==
Turganbaeva was born in 1970. She studied history at Kyrgyz Technical University.

Turganbaeva runs an ethnological museum in Bishkek, the capital city of Kyrgyzstan, with the aim of preserving Kyrgyz cultural heritage. She founded the museum with her husband in 2009. Her philanthropic work includes the preservation of Kyrgyz literature, such as the Epic of Manas, and creating opportunities and resources for manaschi entertainers who recite the classic poem. She has also recreated old Kyrgyz national dishes, such as supara talkan, for young people, by adding chocolate.

Turganbaeva was married to businessman Tabaldy Egemberdiev [ky] (1950–2015), founder of the Shoro beverage company, in 1997. They had a daughter and a son together.

She was named a BBC 100 Woman in 2024.
