= Kyrgyz Stock Exchange =

Kyrgyz Stock Exchange (KSE)
- Kyrgyz: Кыргыз Фондулук Биржасы
- Type: Stock exchange
- Location: Bishkek, Chüy Region, Kyrgyzstan
- Founded: 1994; 32 years ago
- Currency: Kyrgyz som
- Website: kse.kg

The Kyrgyz Stock Exchange (KSE; Kyrgyz: Кыргыз Фондулук Биржасы) was founded on July 20, 1994. Until 2000 the exchange functioned in the form of a non-profit membership organization with a total membership of 16. In May 2000 the KSE was transformed into a joint stock company. In 2001 the Kazakhstan Stock Exchange became a shareholder. Later, a 24.51% share in KSE was acquired by Borsa Istanbul. The Kyrgyz Stock Exchange is a member of the Federation of Euro-Asian Stock Exchanges. In 2023 KSE issued State Treasury Bonds (for two years, in kyrgyz soms and russian rubles). In the middle of 2024 the volume of capitalization of KSE was amounted to $636 million.

The administrative bodies of the KSE are:

- Shareholders General Assembly: main administrative body
- Board of Directors: supervisory body
- President: executive body
- Audit Committee

== Markets ==
KSE operates two markets: Securities and Commodities. The Securities market is allowed to list both domestic and foreign securities admitted to distribution in the Kyrgyz Republic, however as on 1 July 2022 out of the 33 instruments listed in the Securities sector of the KSE, all were of domestic issuers.

The Commodities sector trades physical commodities as well as commodity-linked derivative instruments such as commodity options, futures and forwards. Gold bars of various denominations minted and sold by the National Bank of the Kyrgyz Republic can be purchased on KSE from July 2022.

== Listing Categories ==
The KSE Listing Rules provide for four listing categories in the Securities segment. Categories A and B are reserved for large size issuers with maximum reporting disclosure. Category C is a so-called ‘startup category’ which lists securities not able to meet the strict guidelines for A and B, but nevertheless meeting the full disclosure standards of the exchange. The fourth category, SPAC (Special Purpose Acquisition Company), is reserved for equity of corporations which are yet to make a strategic acquisition, generally in line with standards of SPAC listings existing on major exchanges. SPAC category was introduced only in 2021 and is yet to see its first listing.

== Members ==
KSE admission to trading is open to investment firms regulated in the Kyrgyz Republic and local institutional participants of the investment market such as pension funds and banks. Active trading members of KSE as on 27 July 2022 are:

- BNC Finance, brokerage firm
- Interstan Securities, LLC
- Kazyna Capital, closed joint-stock company
- Zaman, investment & consulting company
- BBB, open joint-stock company
- Kyrgyzstan, private pension fund, open joint-stock company
- Amanbank
- East Star Securities
- Asian Investment Company, LLC
- Askoinvest, LLC
- Pulse Art, LLC
- FVA Finance
- Orient Capital, Investment Company
- Transactor, Asset Management Company
- Royal Pure Gold, LLC
- ASKO&Co, Financial Investment Company
- Senti, Financial Company
- Biman Invest, Financial Company

== Clearing and Settlement ==
KSE operates a trading system allowing the settlement of trades in [Delivery versus Payment|DvP] (Delivery versus Payment) mode. The Central Depository of the Kyrgyz Republic acts as the exchange's settlement depository and clearinghouse. Securities are required to be serviced by the Central Depository to be admitted to listing and trading on the exchange.

== Sources ==
- The Handbook of World Stock, Derivative & Commodity Exchanges. Research and Markets, 2006.
