= Kemelbek Nanaev =

Kyrgyz economist and politician

Kemelbek Kasymkulovich Nanaev (Kyrgyz and Russian: Кемельбек Касымкулович Нанаев; November 7, 1945 – April 4, 2013) was a Kyrgyz economist and politician who served as Chairman of the National Bank of the Kyrgyz Republic (1992-1994), Minister of Finance (1994-1996), and as Ambassador of Kyrgyzstan to the Russian Federation, Armenia, Azerbaijan and Georgia. Nanaev played a very active role in improving the Foreign relations of Kyrgyzstan.

== Biography ==
=== Early life and education ===
Nanaev was born on November 7, 1945, in the village of Merke in the Jambyl Region of the Kazakh SSR. He obtained his undergraduate degree in economics from Kyrgyz National University in 1967 followed by master's degree in Economics from Moscow State University (1970).

=== Career ===
After he left MSU, he worked as a teacher at Kyrgyz National University and in positions in the Communist Party of Kirghizia for 20 years. Following the fall of the USSR, he served as Chairman of the Maksat Commercial Bank. From 1992 to 1994, he served as Chairman of the Central Bank of Kyrgyz Republic. 2 years later, he became Minister of Finance while serving as Deputy Prime Minister. Between 2001 and 2005, he served as Ambassador of Kyrgyzstan to the Russian Federation, Armenia, Azerbaijan and Georgia, as well as served as a Special Representative of the President of Kyrgyzstan for development of trade and economic relations with Russian Federation.

=== Arrest ===
In March 2006, an arrest warrant was issued for Nanaev by the Kyrgyz General Prosecutor. The arrest warrant was based on allegation of corruption during Nanaev's term as Chairman of the Central Bank. He was accused of stealing large amounts of gold concentrate. He was arrested on October 27, 2010, but released on bail the following day.

=== Death and funeral ===
Nanaev died on April 4, 2013, in Issyk-Kul Region of Kyrgyzstan where he was undergoing a medical treatment. His funeral ceremony was held on April 6, 2013, and was broadcast on Kyrgyz Television.
