= Gulnara-Klara Samat =

Kyrgyz politician and diplomat

- Гульнара-Клара Самат
- Born: 20 August 1963; Tash-Kömür
- Occupation: Diplomat, politician
- Position held: member of the Supreme Council of Kyrgyzstan (2018–2021), ambassador of Kyrgyzstan to Russia (2021–)

Gulnara-Klara Samat (born 20 August 1963) is a Kyrgyzstani politician and diplomat. Since 2021, she become an ambassador to Russia and Armenia.
