= The Times of Central Asia =

- Type: Daily newspaper
- Format: Online
- Owner: Frontier News
- Founded: 1999
- Language: English
- Website: timesca.com

The Times of Central Asia (TCA) is an English-language news outlet covering political, economic, and social developments across the Central Asian countries and the wider Eurasian region. Founded in 1999 in Bishkek, Kyrgyzstan, it publishes online at timesca.com. The outlet is registered with ISSN 1607-3592 for its online edition.

== History ==
TCA was established in Bishkek in 1999 by Giorgio Fiacconi, who served for 15 years as the first Honorary Consul of Italy to Kyrgyzstan. During its early years, the publication focused on English-language reporting from Kyrgyzstan and neighboring states before expanding its geographic scope to the broader Central Asian region.

== Coverage and operations ==
TCA publishes daily online coverage of regional politics, economics, culture, and foreign affairs across Kazakhstan, Kyrgyzstan, Tajikistan, Turkmenistan, and Uzbekistan, as well as relevant Eurasia-wide issues. The site lists its editorial and contact details in New York, United States, and accepts pitches, opinion submissions, and corrections via an online portal.

Audio and partnerships

Since October 2025, TCA has hosted the "Spotlight on Central Asia" podcast in partnership with the Oxus Society for Central Asian Affairs, chaired by journalists Bruce Pannier and Michael Hillard.

== Notable use and reception ==
TCA reporting is periodically cited by research institutions and think tanks covering Eurasia and Central Asia policy. University library catalogs also list the outlet among online newspapers covering the region.
