= Marat Sultanov =

Kyrgyzstani politician

Marat Abdyrazakovich Sultanov is a Kyrgyz politician.

He was born in December 1960 in Frunze.

Sultanov was the chairman of the central bank, National Bank of the Kyrgyz Republic, from July 1994 to December 1998. He was appointed minister of economy and finance from January to July 1999. In 2000 he was elected as a deputy to Supreme Council of Kyrgyzstan.

Sultanov was the chairman of the Supreme Council from March 2006 to October 2007.

He was again minister of economy and finance from January 2009 to April 2010. In 2010 he was elected to the parliament as a member of Ata-Jurt Kyrgyzstan.
