= Baktygul Jeenbaeva =

Kyrgyzstani politician (born 1960)

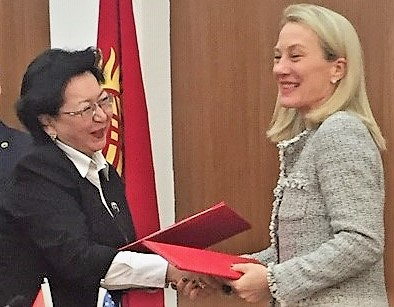
Jeenbaeva (left) and U.S. Ambassador Alice G. Wells announcing repatriation of stolen assets to Kyrgyz Republic in 2019

Baktygul Janybekovna Jeenbaeva (born 31 July 1960) is a Kyrgyzstani politician who was the country's Finance Minister from December 2018 until October 2020.

== Early life and education ==
Jeenbaeva was born on 31 July 1960 in Bishkek, then called Frunze and part of the Soviet Union. Her father, Janybek Jeenbaev, a nuclear physicist, was president of the Kyrgyz Academy of Sciences. She has degrees in mathematics and economics from the Kyrgyz National University.

== Career ==
Jeenbaeva worked as an economist for the production association Ak-Tilek from 1985 until 1992. She was then an economist at the Department of External and Public Relations. In 2007 she became General Director of the New Television Network. In 2010 she became acting Chair of the National Bank of the Kyrgyz Republic and in 2016, chair of the Board of the State Mortgage Company. At the time, she publicly lamented the Bank's lack of independence.

Jeenbaeva has been a member of the Akshumkar political party since 2007. From 6 July 2018 until 12 December 2018 she was an advisor to the president of Kyrgyzstan.

On 12 December 2018, the Parliament approved Jeenbaeva's candidacy as Minister of Finance with 101 members voting for her after Prime Minister Mukhammedkalyi Abylgaziev proposed her for the position. She was officially appointed by President Sooronbay Jeenbekov the following day.

In 2019, Jeenbaeva was called as a witness in a criminal case against the Legal Representation Center for the alleged embezzlement of funds.

In May 2020, Jeenbaeva announced a deficit budget of 37,724.3 billion soms. Her role concluded due to the 2020 Kyrgyz parliamentary election, subsequent revolution and installation of the interim government.

== Personal life ==
Jeenbaeva is divorced and has a son.
