= National Bank of the Kyrgyz Republic =

Central Bank of Kyrgyzstan

Coordinates: 42.8758°N 74.5812°E

National Bank of the Kyrgyz Republic Кыргыз Республикасынын Улуттук Банкы (Kyrgyz) Национальный банк Кыргызской Республики (Russian)

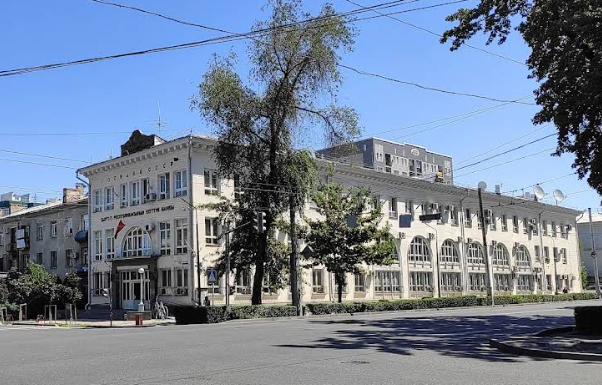
- Central bank of: Kyrgyzstan
- Headquarters: 168 Chuy Avenue, Bishkek, 720001
- Established: 1991
- Ownership: 100% state ownership
- Chairman: Almaz Baketayev
- Currency: Som
- Reserves: ▲US$2.335 billion (2019)
- Preceded by: State Bank of the Soviet Union
- Website: www.nbkr.kg

The National Bank of the Kyrgyz Republic (Kyrgyz: Кыргыз Республикасынын Улуттук Банкы, romanized: Kyrgyz Respublikasynyn Uluttuk Banky) is the central bank of Kyrgyzstan and is primarily responsible for the strategic monetary policy planning of the country as well as the issuance of the national currency, the Som.

== History ==
The Kyrgyz Republic created the National Bank by legislation of June 1991 from the prior Kyrgyz operations of the State Bank of the USSR, and was thus the second-to-last Soviet republic to establish its own central bank. In its initial years, Kyrgyzstan and many other post-Soviet states mainly relied on the Soviet rouble as its currency. The instability of the currency and the multiple countries being unable to cooperate over monetary and fiscal policies, led to the Russian Central Bank setting up restrictions to the flow of credit and ultimately withdrawing from the currency union which then collapsed. On 10 May 1993, Kyrgyzstan then issued the first series of som, at an exchange rate of 200 Soviet roubles to 1 Kyrgyzstani som, these banknotes were known as "the banknotes of the transitional period". The following year, the second series of som was released, these banknotes were known as "the banknotes of the stabilisation period". Governmental and central bank actions in the form of price liberalisation, commercial legislation, agriculture reformation, assets privatisation, and the opening up of the market to external trade, finally led to Kyrgyzstan overcoming the massive inflation and unemployment that plagued both periods up till 1996. Starting from 1997, the third series of som was released. In 2008 the first two series of notes were withdrawn from circulation while the first issue of coins began, due to the need for ease of transaction of small change. Starting from 2009 the fourth series of som was released. In 2018, the central bank marked 25 years of issuing banknotes by approving in the previous year the underlined C as the official currency symbol of the som as well as issuing its first commemorative banknote. The C with a line underneath was chosen by the central bank to show that the national currency is stable.

== Functions ==
The overall objective of the activity of the National Bank of the Kyrgyz Republic is to achieve and maintain stability of prices by means of implementing an appropriate monetary policy. The primary task contributory to attainment of the corporate objective of the bank is to maintain a purchasing power of the national currency, and safety and reliability of the banking and payment system of the republic. The central bank independently manages and engages in its activity irrespective of governmental authorities action to perform its assigned tasks efficiently. The National Bank of the Kyrgyz Republic performs the following basic functions:

1. Develops, determines and implements the monetary policy in the Kyrgyz Republic
2. Exercises regulation and supervision over activities of banks and finance and credit institutions licensed by the National Bank of the Kyrgyz Republic
3. Develops and conducts the uniform currency policy
4. Has the sole responsibility to issue banknotes
5. Promotes effective functioning of the payment system
6. Establishes rules of conducting banking operations, accounting and reporting for the banking system

In September 2024 it has been reported that the National Bank of Kyrgyz Republic plans to introduce new measures that will improve the security and protection of clients, such as effective anti-fraud systems, that will help detect suspicious transactions and prevent fraud.

=== Monetary policy ===
The monetary policy carried out by the central bank is to meet the overall objective of price stability in the country. A quantitative target of the monetary policy as set out by the bank is the maintaining of inflation rate within the range of 5-7 percent in the medium-term period. In the event of internal macroeconomic instability due to the small and open economy of the Kyrgyz Republic, monetary policy measures will be focused on returning inflation rate to the quantitative target. The medium-term objective of this policy is to strengthen operation of the interest rate channel in the transmission mechanism. Development of the policy will be carried out on the basis of the interest rates targeting, because using interest rates as the target for the monetary policy will allow the central bank to affect the short-term market rates, thereby creating conditions for convergence of the rates in the money and lending market. The central bank also develops policies to promote financial inclusion which targets the rural parts of the country as the economy there is still largely agricultural based. These would overall contribute to long-term economic growth in the republic.

=== Exchange rate policy ===
The central bank follows an approved floating exchange-rate regime, whereby the som is not pegged to any currency nor is any currency likewise pegged to it. Currency interventions will be carried out in order to smooth sharp fluctuations of the exchange rate where necessary. The central bank will also purchase gold for the national currency in the internal market in order to likewise smooth the effect of fluctuations of the foreign currencies exchange rate in the external markets. This will also diversify the risks that the value of the central bank reserve assets will deteriorate, and allow for the accumulation of gold and foreign-exchange reserves.

=== Communication and cooperative policy ===
The central bank carries out regular meetings with the Ministry of Finance within the framework of the Inter-agency Coordination Council in order to provide coordinated implementation of the monetary and fiscal policies. During the development and implementation of these policies the central bank also carries out an active communication policy in order to provide transparency and openness of the decision making process, as well as submit information on the issues connected with the monetary policy to the general public. These come in the form of published press-releases and press-conferences, which are held within two working days after each meeting, and will clarify on the reasons for the decisions made on the policy rate. In addition, every quarter of a year, the central bank publishes the “Monetary policy report (Inflation Report)”, which comprises a review of external and internal economic environment, assessment of economic prospects, trends and inflation forecasts.

=== Laws and regulation ===
The status, objectives, functions, powers and principles of organisation and activity of the National Bank of the Kyrgyz Republic are legislatively determined by the Constitution of the Kyrgyz Republic and the Law on National bank of the Kyrgyz Republic, banks and banking activity. However the central bank still has power in the implementation of rules and regulations to which commercial banks and related industries within the republic have to abide by, these include minimum charter capital and obligatory reserves. For example, in December 2013, the central bank published draft legal amendments related to antitrust, competition and consumer protections aimed at the commercial banking, financial and credit industries.

=== Issuance of currency ===
The central bank has the sole authority to issue banknotes and coins of the Kyrgyz Republic som. All four series of Kyrgyz banknotes are still legal tender and are able to be used for all transactions within Kyrgyz Republic, despite the first two series being withdrawn by the central bank from active circulation. The banknotes are printed in France and the United Kingdom, while the coins are minted in Kazakhstan.

==== Commemorative currency ====
On 11 Aug 1995, the central bank issued its first collectible coins, in gold and silver, with a face value of 100 and 10 som respectively. These were issued to commemorate the 1000th anniversary of the Epic of Manas. Since then the central bank has issued many other commemorative coins depicting various aspects of Kyrgyzstan life as well as international events. Several of these commemorative coins had later won awards in international competitions abroad. An example of which in 2013, the central bank marked Independence Day by issuing silver and copper-nickel coins with the theme of "Historical and architectural monuments of Kyrgyzstan" that featured the Saimaluu Tash, as well as gold and silver coins with the theme of "Red Book of Kyrgyzstan" that featured various wildlife of Kyrgyzstan. The coins featuring Saimaluu Tash later won third place in the nomination of "Silver coin of the year" award in the eighth international commemorative coin contest. In 2017, in the run-up to the central bank marking 25 years of issuing banknotes, a 2000 som commemorative banknote was issued. It was the bank's first commemorative banknote as well as the first vertically orientated som banknote. This banknote later won the "Best Regional Banknote of 2018" award among the various Central, Eastern European and CIS countries competing.

=== Museum ===
The central bank also manages the Numismatic Museum of the National Bank of the Kyrgyz Republic. The museum first started off in 1998 as an exhibition to mark the fifth anniversary of the introduction of the national currency. However this exhibition was subsequently transformed into a permanent numismatic museum, due to the great interest displayed by visitors during the duration of the exhibition. It now showcases the transformation of the som through the years as well as various first sketches of the national currency.

== Board of directors ==
The Board of the National Bank of the Kyrgyz Republic consists of seven members, which are the Chairman of the National Bank, his three deputies and three other members of the Board. All board members have shared power and responsibilities, with members of the board appointed by the President of Kyrgyz Republic by recommendation of the Chairman of the National Bank for a period of seven years.

=== Chairmen ===
- Kemelbek Nanaev, 1992 - 1994
- Marat Sultanov, 1994 - 1999
- Ulan Sarbanov, January 1999 - 2006
- Marat Alapaev, 2006 - 2010
- Baktygul Jeenbaeva, July 2010 - June 2011
- Zina Asankojoeva, June 2011 - April 2014
- Tolkunbek Abdygulov, May 2014 - September 2018
- Kubanychbek Kulmatov, September 2018 - December 2018
- Tolkunbek Abdygulov, December 2018 - September 2021
- Kubanychbek Bokontayev, September 2021 - June 2024
- Melis Turgunbaev, June 2024 - March 2026
- Almaz Baketayev, March 2026 -

== Organisational structure ==
The National Bank of the Kyrgyz Republic is structured into ten different departments that tackle various aspects of operation of the bank to accomplish its mission and function. It is further aided by 15 other smaller units that allow for the smooth operation of the bank.

Departments of the bank
- Economic Department
- Monetary Operations Department
- Financial Statistics and Review Department
- External Oversight Department
- Inspection Department
- Supervision Methodology and Licensing Department
- Cash Management Department
- Payment Systems Department
- Accounting and Reporting Department
- Bank Settlements Department
Units of the bank
- Legal Department
- Security and Information Security Department
- Administration and Logistics Department
- Banking Automation Department
- Internal Audit Service
- Finance and Monitoring Department
- Personnel Division
- Risk Control Division
- Public Relations Department
- International Cooperation Department
- State Language Development and Documentation Management Department
- Construction and Repair Department
- Procurement Group
- Educational Recreation Centre (recreation centre "Tolkun")
- Regional departments and representation office of the National Bank

The central bank also has branches in different regions of Kyrgyz Republic

- Issyk-Kul, town of Karakol
- Naryn, town of Naryn
- Talas, town of Talas
- Jalalalabat, town of Jalalalabat
- Osh, city of Osh
- Batken, town of Batken

== Local relation ==
The central bank has as part of its outreach campaign taken various steps to engage with citizens as well as stakeholders in the banking industry. In 1999, the central bank began an informational and educational campaign for the general public known as "Som- the face of Kyrgyzstan". The goal of the campaign was to attract the attention of the public to the usage of the national currency and many posters and booklets were distributed as a result. The Union of Banks of Kyrgyzstan was also established by the central bank to bring the various commercial banks operating in Kyrgyz Republic together to allow for better representation of interest and protection of rights of these banks. The emergence of e-payments as an alternative to cash payments worldwide also saw the central bank establishing and promoting the usage of these modes of payments. The Elcard (Элкарт) was introduced as a national payment system and POS terminals (POS-терминалдарды) were actively promoted and incorporated into businesses around the country to allow for its use. Inter-bank payment system of "Real-Time Gross Settlement System (RTGS, Айкын убакыт ыргагында эсептешүүлөрдүн гросстук система)" and the "Bulk Clearing System (BCS, Пакеттик клиринг системасы)" are also found within Kyrgyz Republic banks to allow for the transfer of inter-bank funds.

== International relations ==
Kyrgyz Republic through its central bank is an active member of several international financial organisations. The republic acceded into the International Monetary Fund and World Bank in 1992, Asian Development Bank and Islamic Development Bank in 1994 and later the World Trade Organization in 1998. The republic is also a member of the Alliance for Financial Inclusion. The three largest external debt loaned from multilateral organisations by the republic, according to its annual bank report released in 2017, were incurred from the World Bank, Asian Development Bank and International Monetary Fund, from which US$667 million, 601 million and 200 million were loaned respectively. The external debt was mainly used to finance multiple infrastructural, agricultural and healthcare developments in the country.

International payment systems like Zolotaya Korona's Alai-Card (Золотая корона-Алай-Кард), Visa, Demirbank (Демир Банкы), Mastercard and UnionPay are accepted in the country alongside the national payment system of Elcard, with the first two being the most popular after Elcard. Additionally in 2017, a road map for the integration of Elcard with Mir, the Russian national payment system, was signed. The central banks of Armenia, Belarus, Tajikistan and Uzbekistan were also signatories for the road map plan.

== Statistics ==
Credit Rating
National Bank of the Kyrgyz Republic
Agency	Fitch Ratings		Moody's Investors Service		Standard & Poor's	
Current Ratings	NR	since 2004	B2/stable	since 2015	NR with n/a outlook	since 2016
Previous Ratings	CCC/C; B+/B	since 2001 since 1998	NR		B/B	since 2015

== See also ==
- Economy of Kyrgyzstan
- Kyrgyz som
- List of central banks
