= Kyrgyz Technical University =

University in Bishkek, Kyrgyzstan

Kyrgyz State Technical University named after Iskhak Razzakov
- Исхак Раззаков атындагы Кыргыз Мамлекеттик Тех Университети (Kyrgyz); Кыргызский государственный технический университет (Russian)
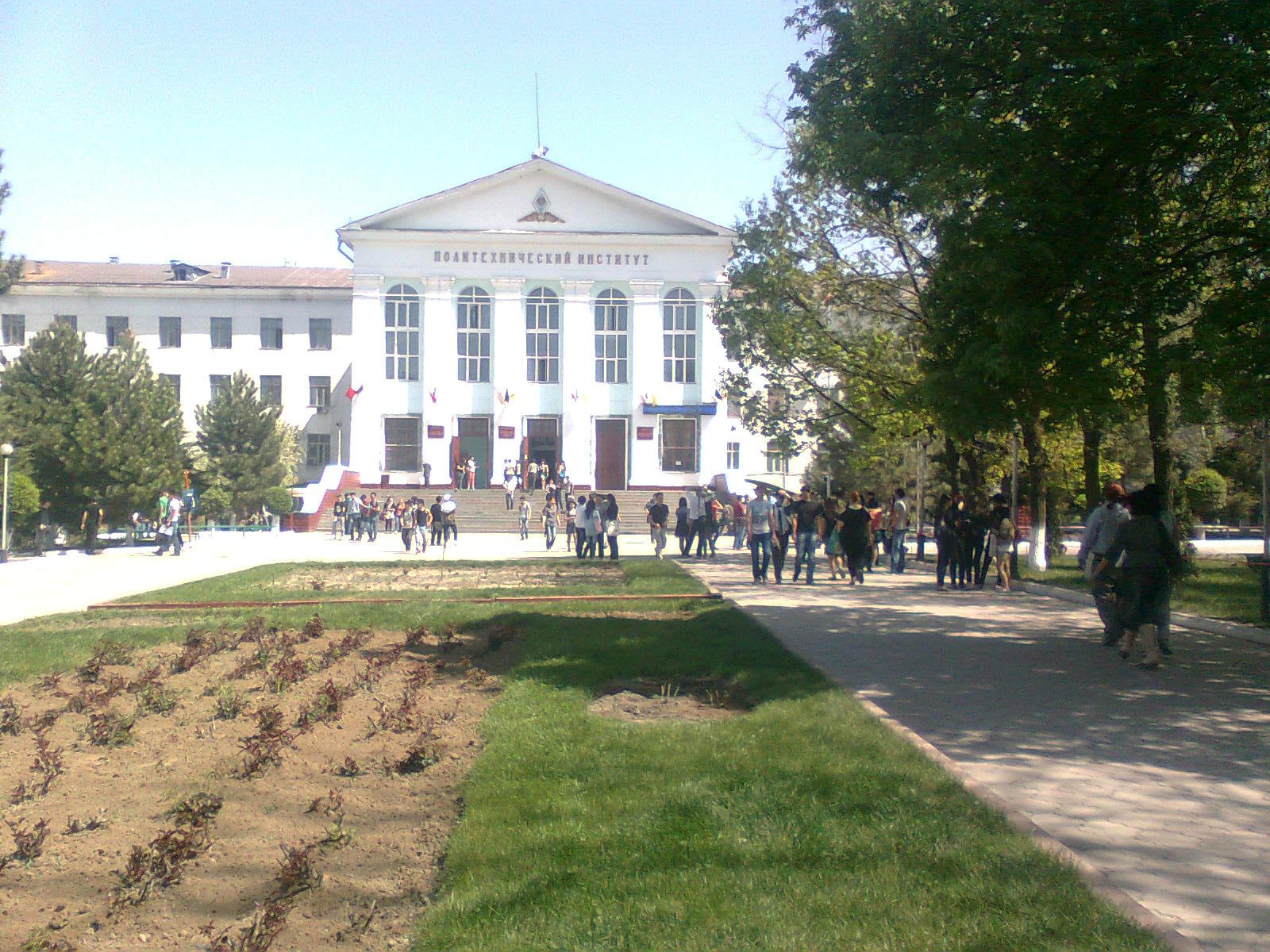
- Type: Public
- Established: 1954
- Rector: Murataly Jamanbaev
- Location: 66 Mir Avenue, Bishkek 720044, Kyrgyz Republic, Bishkek, Kyrgyzstan
- Campus: Urban
- Website: kstu.kg

The Kyrgyz State Technical University (Kyrgyz: Кыргыз мамлекеттик техникалык университети), named after Iskhak Razzakov, is a university in Bishkek, Kyrgyzstan. Formerly the university was known as the Frunze Polytechnic Institute (Russian: Фрунзенский политехнический институт). It was founded in 1954.

== Faculties ==
=== Informational Technologies ===
1. Management and information science in technical systems
2. Computer engineering, computing machinery, complexes, systems and networks
3. Software system of computing machinery and automated systems
4. Radio engineering
5. Designing and technology of radio electronics
6. Connection networks and communication systems
7. Radio communication, broadcasting (system) and television

=== Power Engineering ===
1. Electric stations
2. Power engineering and networks
3. Relay protection and automatization of electrical power system
4. Power Energy supply (in brunches)
5. Renewable sources of energy
6. Electro technics (in branches)
7. Electric drive and automation of industrial plant and technological complexes
8. Thermoelectric power station
9. Safety of technological processes and productions

=== Transport and Machine-construction ===
1. Automobile and automobile industry
2. Exploitation and service of transport technological machinery and equipment
3. Organization of transportation and management at transport (by all kinds of vehicle)
4. Organization and safety of traffic
5. Technology of machine-constructing
6. Equipment and technology of welding industry
7. Constructing and manufacturing products from composite material
8. Machines and technology for increasing wear resistant and reconstruction of machines and apparatus details
9. Automation of technological processes and industries (on branches)
10. Standardization and certification
11. Metrology and metrological supply
12. Mechatronics and robotic
13. Dynamics and machine durability
14. Professional education
15. Technology of printing industry

=== Institute of Management and Business ===
1. Management of organizations
2. Informational systems and technologies
3. Journalism
4. Economics and management of enterprise (in branches)
5. Business accounting, financial audit and analysis

=== Technological Faculty ===
1. Technology of sewing production
2. Technology of leather and fur wear
3. Design of sewing wear
4. Technology of leather wear
5. Designing of leather products
6. Decorative designing of costume
7. Technology of catering products
8. Technology of canned products, food concentrates of barmy products and wine making
9. Technology of sugary products
10. Technology of meat and meat products
11. Technology of milk and milk products
12. Technology of bread, macaroni and confectionery
13. Technology of reprocessing and storage of grain
14. Machines and apparatus of food production
15. Food engineering of small industries
16. Standardization and certification of food products
17. Management (specialization: management and marketing in restaurant and hotel business)
18. Chemist-researcher, Chemist - ecologist
19. Protection in emergency situation
20. Engineering protection of environment

=== Kyrgyz-German Technical ===
1. Technology, equipment and automation of machine-constructing industries
2. Technology and management of machine-constructing industry
3. Transport – telematic logistic

=== Institute of Mining and Mining Technologies ===
==== Metallurgy and Geo-ecology Department ====
1. Metallurgy of ferrous metal
2. Metallurgy of non-ferrous metal
3. Mineral processing
4. Geo ecology
5. Environmental protection and racial use of natural resources
6. Engineering protection of environment
7. Applied information science in ecology

==== Mining ====
1. Blasting operations
2. Underground workings of mineral deposit
3. Open mining researches
4. Mine underground construction
5. Applied geodesy
6. Technology and equipment (mining machines and equipment)
7. Electro technology, electro mechanics, electro technics (electro mechanics of mining industry)

==== Geological Prospecting Faculty ====
1. Geophysical methods of search and prospecting of mineral deposits
2. Geological survey of groundwater and engineering-geological investigations
3. Geology of oil and gas
4. Applied geochemistry, petrology, mineralogy
5. Technology and exploration technique of mineral deposits
6. Applied math and information science
7. Technology of materials processing
8. Protection in emergent situations
9. Nature management

==== Mining Economy Faculty ====
1. Economics (economics of enterprise in mineral resource industry)
2. Business accounting, financial audit and analysis (in mineral resource industry)
3. Management of organization (in mineral resource industry)
4. Information systems and technologies
5. Automation systems of information processing and management
6. Mathematical methods in economics
7. Applied math and information science

=== Department of Vocational Education ===
1. Designing and modeling of sewing products
2. Designing and modeling of fur products
3. Technical service and repairing of electronics
4. Hairdressing craft

=== Moscow Power Energy Institute (TU) ===
1. Electrical networks and systems
2. Electrical supply
3. Automatic control and informatics of technical systems
4. Radio techniques
5. Computing machinery, complexes and networks

== Notable alumni and faculty ==
- Askar Akaev, former president of Kyrgyzstan
- Arstanbek Nogoev, former mayor of Bishkek
- Zhanylsynzat Turganbaeva, businesswoman, museum manager and philanthropist
