= Ahror Iminov =

Kyrgyzstani businessman (born 1987)

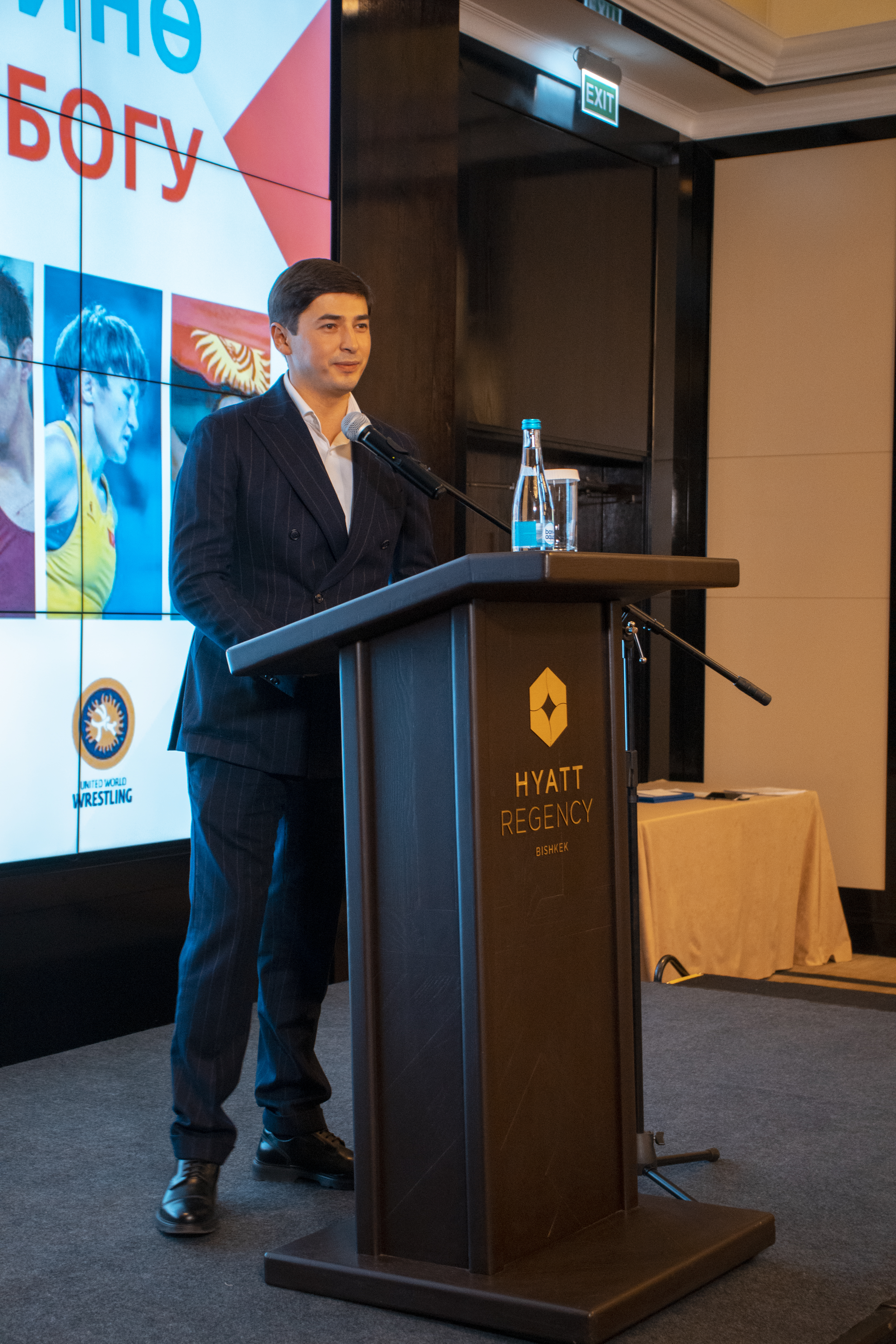
- Ahror Iminov speaking at a sports event in 2020
- Born: Iminov Ahror Khikmatillaevich; 14 July 1987 (age 39); Osh, Kyrgyz SSR, Soviet Union
- Citizenship: Kyrgyzstan
- Education: Newcastle University; Diplomatic Academy of the Ministry of Foreign Affairs of the Kyrgyz Republic
- Known for: Vice-President of the Wrestling Federation of the Kyrgyz Republic

Ahror Iminov (Russian: Иминов Ахрор Хикматиллаевич; born 14 July 1987) is a Kyrgyzstani businessman. He has been the vice president of the Wrestling Federation of the Kyrgyz Republic since 2018. In 2020, he was elected for parliament, but following the 2020 Kyrgyz protests the election results were annulled.
