= Ruslan Kazakbayev =

Kyrgyzstani politician (born 1967)

- Руслан Казакбаев
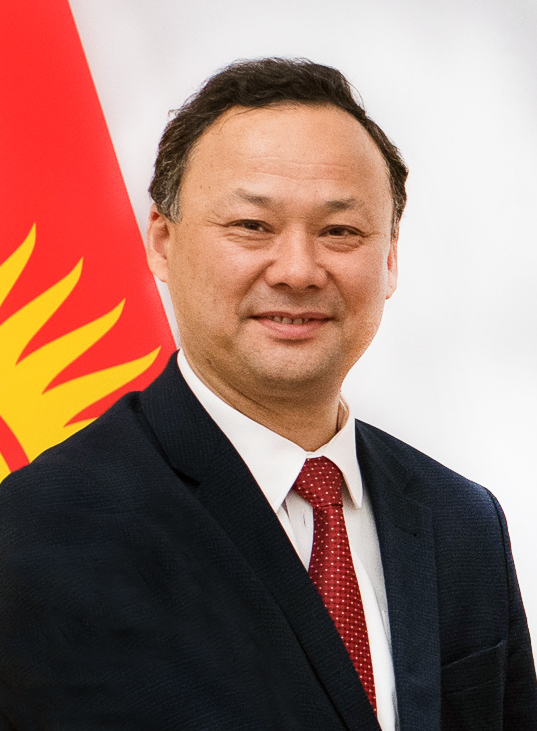
- Kazakbayev in 2021

Minister of Foreign Affairs
- In office 14 October 2020 – 22 April 2022
- President: Sadyr Japarov
- Preceded by: Chingiz Aidarbekov
- Succeeded by: Jeenbek Kulubaev
- In office 15 April 2010 – 6 September 2012
- President: Roza Otunbayeva; Almazbek Atambayev
- Preceded by: Kadyrbek Sarbayev
- Succeeded by: Erlan Abdyldayev

Personal details
- Born: 18 May 1967 (age 59) Kirov Rayon, Kyrgyz SSR, USSR
- Party: Respublika
- Other political affiliations: Respublika–Ata Zhurt

Ruslan Aitbaevich Kazakbayev (Russian: Руслан Айтбаевич Казакбаев; born 18 May 1967) is a Kyrgyzstani politician and diplomat. He served as Minister of Foreign Affairs from October 2020 to April 2022. From 2015-2020, he was also a Deputy of the Supreme Council.

== Early life and education ==
Born on May 18, 1967 in the Kirov Rayon of the Talas Region. In 1991, he graduated from the Frunze Polytechnic Institute (now the Kyrgyz Technical University) and then served as leading engineer for bus depot No. 4 in Bishkek. In 2002 he graduated from the Faculty of Law of the Kyrgyz National University and in 2004 from the Diplomatic Academy of the Ministry of Foreign Affairs.

== Diplomatic career ==
He joined the foreign ministry in 1995, serving in the consular department before becoming vice consul in Istanbul a year later. From 1999-2004, he headed the Main Directorate of Consular Service and from 2004-2009, was Consul General in Istanbul. From January-October 2009, he served as First Deputy Minister to Kadyrbek Sarbayev.

On April 15, 2010, following the 2010 Kyrgyz Revolution he was appointed Minister of Foreign Affairs under Roza Otunbayeva. He continued in this position under Almazbek Atambayev and served in this position until September 6, 2012. He was reappointed to the post following the 2020 Kyrgyz Revolution and the assumption of Sadyr Japarov to the post of president. Kazakbayev was dismissed on April 22, 2022.

Since November 2022, he has been ambassador to Turkey, and since June 2023, concurrent ambassador to Israel and concurrent ambassador to Albania, North Macedonia and Montenegro since January 2025.

== Awards ==
- Order of Danaker (December 30, 2021)
- Dank Medal (August 30, 2016)
- Personalized Watch of the President of the Kyrgyz Republic (November 29, 2011)
- Jubilee Medal “IPA CIS. 25 Years” (October 13, 2017)
- Certificate of Honor of the Council of the IPA CIS (May 19, 2016)
- Certificate of the Commonwealth of Independent States (September 3, 2011)
