= Jeenbek Kulubayev =

Kyrgyzstani politician

- Жээнбек Кулубаев
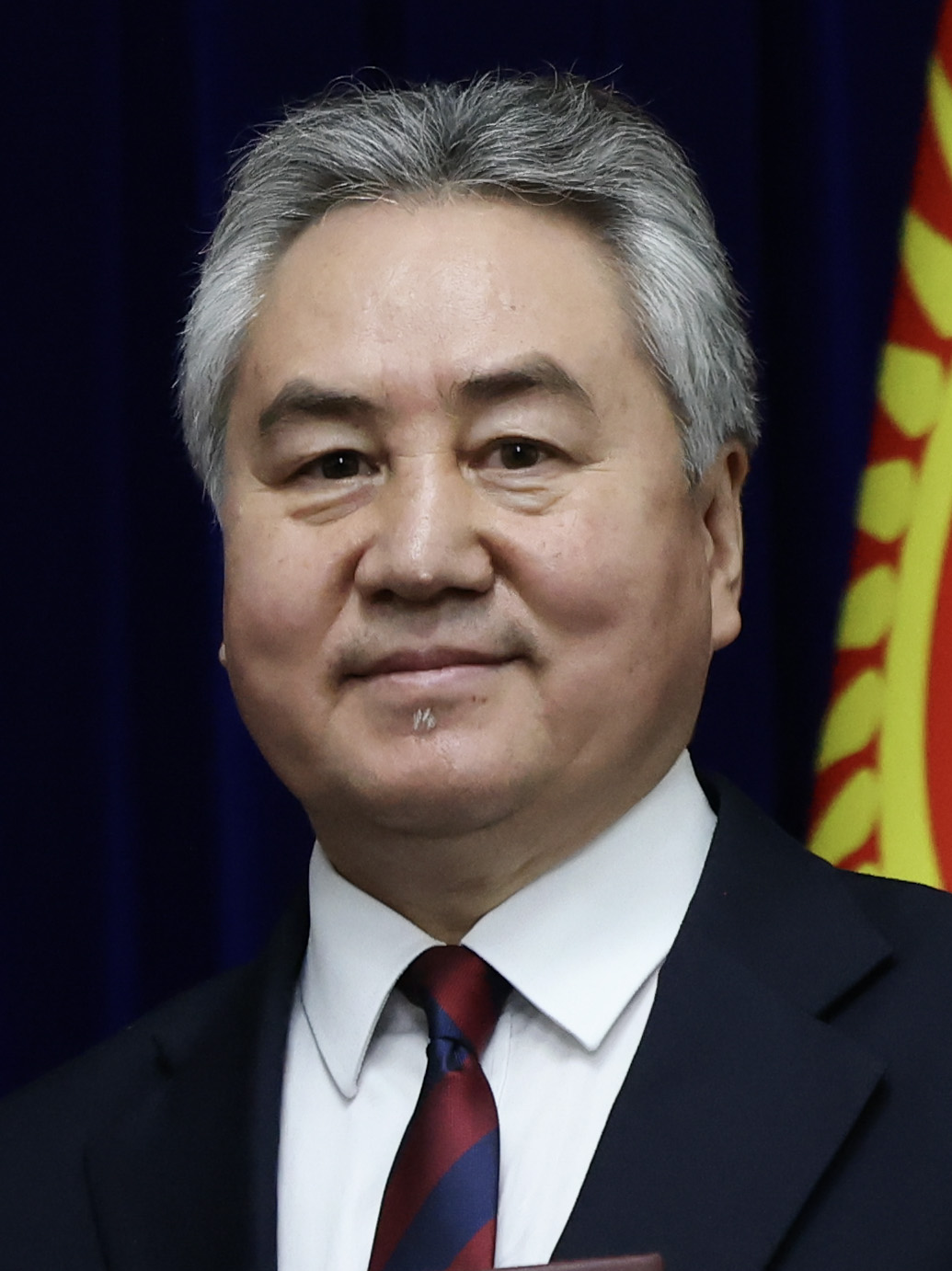
- Kulubayev in 2024

Minister of Foreign Affairs
- Incumbent
- Assumed office 22 April 2022
- President: Sadyr Japarov
- Preceded by: Ruslan Kazakbayev

Personal details
- Born: 5 April 1963 (age 63) Chyrpykty, Issyk-Kul Region, Kyrgyz SSR, USSR

Jeenbek Moldokanovich Kulubayev (Kyrgyz: Жээнбек Молдоканович Кулубаев; born 5 April 1963) is a Kyrgyzstani politician and diplomat who serves as Minister of Foreign Affairs of Kyrgyzstan.

== Early life and education ==
Born on 5 April 1963 in the village of Chyrpykty, Issyk-Kul Region. He graduated from the Moscow Military Institute and the Diplomatic Institute of the Chinese Foreign Ministry.

== Diplomatic career ==
From 1992 to 1996, he served as the Second Secretary, then promoted to the position of First Secretary, and later became an Advisor to the Asia and Pacific Department of the Ministry of Foreign Affairs. Subsequently, between 1996 and 1998, he assumed the role of Head of the Department of Eastern Countries within the Ministry of Foreign Affairs. Following this, from 1998 to 2001, he served as a Counselor at the Embassy in China.

Returning to the Ministry of Foreign Affairs, he became the Head of the Department of Eastern Countries once again from 2001 to 2003. In recognition of his experience and dedication, he was appointed as the Deputy Minister of Foreign Affairs between 2003 and 2004. His involvement extended internationally when he became the Deputy Executive Secretary of the Shanghai Cooperation Organization from 2004 to 2007.

Continuing his diplomatic career, he was assigned as the Ambassador to Malaysia from 2007 to 2009, after which he assumed the role of Ambassador to China from 2009 to 2013. During the same period, he concurrently served as the Ambassador to Mongolia and Singapore.

In the years 2013 to 2016, he had the honor of leading the Department of Eastern Countries once more as its Director within the Ministry of Foreign Affairs of the Kyrgyz Republic. Subsequently, in 2016 until October 2018, he took on the responsibility of directing the Fourth Political Department of the Ministry of Foreign Affairs.

Building on his extensive experience, he was designated as the Ambassador to Kazakhstan in October 2018, a position he held until August 2021. Afterward, from August 2021 to April 2022, he led the Foreign Policy Department of the Presidential Administration of the Kyrgyz Republic.

== Minister ==
Since April 22, 2022, he has been Minister of Foreign Affairs of the Kyrgyz Republic.

== Awards ==
- Medal "Dank"
- Order of Friendship (Kazakhstan)
