= Ministry of Foreign Affairs (Kyrgyzstan) =

Government ministry of Kyrgyzstan

- Kyrgyz: Тышкы иштер министрлиги Tışkı İşter Ministrligi; Russian: Министерство иностранных дел Ministerstvo inostrannykh del

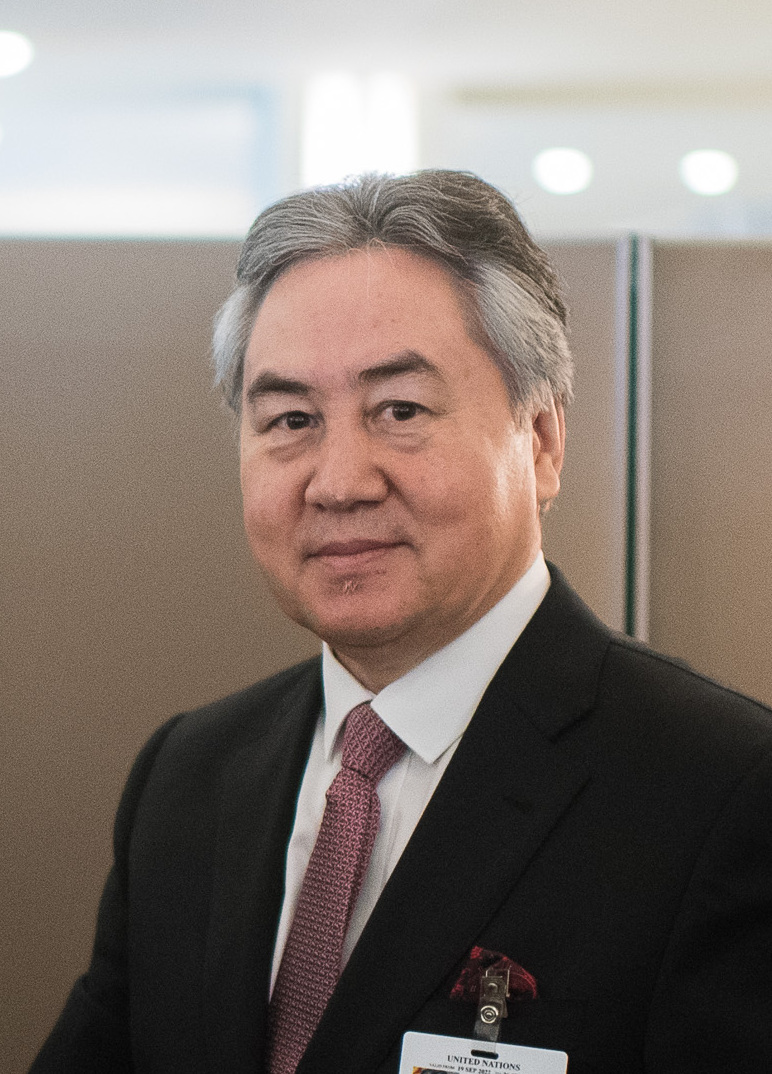
- Incumbent Minister; Jeenbek Kulubayev since 22 April 2022

Agency overview
- Jurisdiction: Government of Kyrgyzstan
- Headquarters: Bishkek, Kyrgyzstan
- Minister responsible: Jeenbek Kulubayev
- Deputy Ministers responsible: Asein Isaev, First Deputy Minister; Almaz Imangaziev; Avazbek Atakhanov; Ainek Moldogaziev
- Parent department: Ministry of Foreign Affairs of the Kyrgyz SSR
- Website: https://mfa.gov.kg/en

The Ministry of Foreign Affairs (Kyrgyz: Тышкы иштер министрлиги, Kyrgyz pronunciation: [tʰɯʂqɯ ɪʂtʰer ministʰrliɡi]; Russian: Министерство иностранных дел) is the Kyrgyz government ministry which oversees the foreign relations of Kyrgyzstan.

== History ==
On February 1, 1944, the Supreme Soviet of the USSR adopted the law "On the granting of powers to the Union republics in the area of foreign relations and the transformation of the People's Commissariat of Foreign Affairs from the Union-Republican People's Commissariat".

In accordance with this Law, the Supreme Council of Kyrgyzstan on March 17, 1944, established People's Commissariat of Foreign Affairs of the Kirghiz Soviet Socialist Republic.

In March 1944, all future People's Commissars from the republics of the Union were invited to undergo training at the People's Commissariat of Foreign Affairs, where they met with Soviet Foreign minister Vyacheslav Molotov.

By decree on July 31, 1944, Kazy Dikambaev was appointed People's Commissar of Foreign Affairs of the Kyrgyz SSR. In the year of his appointment, he worked as the People's Commissioner of the Republic for State Controls.

On September 9, 1944, the State State Commission under the Sovnarkom of the USSR approved the state NKID of the Kyrgyz Republic in the amount of 35 units. September 23, 1944. The state was approved by Narkomindele USSR. The Ministry dealt with repatriates from China. In 1958, 200 families of immigrants from the People's Republic of China settled in Jalal-Abad region. The Ministry of Foreign Affairs of the Kyrgyz SSR also carried out protocol services for foreign delegations and individual representatives who visited the republic on the lines of other ministries and departments. Thus, in 1968, the Ministry of Foreign Affairs of the Republic received a delegation from Finland and diplomats from the Mongolian embassy in Moscow. The Ministry of Foreign Affairs also participated in the organization of 12 foreign delegations that arrived in the republic on the lines of other ministries and departments.

In 1970, the Ministry of Foreign Affairs of the Republic had the following structure:

- General Secretary of the Ministry of Foreign Affairs
- Head of the consular department
- First secretary
- Inspector of the special part-secretary-typist

In 1971, the main attention of the Ministry was focused on consular and protocol work. The Ministry supported the embassies of the USSR in Uruguay, in Venezuela, in West Germany, Czechoslovakia, China, as well as the General Consulate of the USSR in Leipzig, Poznań, and Brno.

== Departments ==
The following 11 are departments in the Ministry of Foreign Affairs:

- Commonwealth of Independent States Department
- Western Department
- Eastern Department
- Department for International Organizations
- Department of Economic Co-operation
- Consular Service
- Legal Department
- Financial Department
- Help Department
- Protocol Department
- Frontier Department

== Diplomatic academy ==
The Kazy Dikambayev Diplomatic Academy of the Ministry of Foreign Affairs of Kyrgyzstan (Russian: Дипломатической академии Министерства иностранных дел Кыргызской Республики им. К. Дикамбаева) is the main instructional institution of the ministry which is used to train future diplomats of Kyrgyzstan. Founded in 2001, the academy is officially accredited and recognized by the Ministry of Education and Science of Kyrgyzstan as a public coeducational institution. It is located on 36 Prospect Erkindik in the capital city of Bishkek.

The academy is currently partnered with the following organizations:

- Diplomatic Academy of the Ministry of Foreign Affairs of the Russian Federation
- MGIMO University
- Xinjiang University
- Confucius Institute
- Lanzhou University
- Friedrich Ebert Foundation
- Konrad Adenauer Foundation
- Diplomatic Academy of Vienna

== List of ministers ==
=== Kyrgyz SSR ===
- 1944-1949: Kazy Dikambayev
- 1949-1953: Shamshy Tayanov
- 1953-1963: Kuluipa Konduchalova
- 1963-1980: Sakin Begmatova
- 1980-1986: Dzhamal Tashibekova
- 1986-1989: Roza Otunbayeva
- 1989-1991: Zhanyl Tumenbayeva

=== Kyrgyz Republic ===
- 1991-1992: Muratbek Imanaliyev
- 1992: Roza Otunbayeva
- 1992: Marat Saralinov (acting)
- 1992-1993: Ednan Karabayev
- 1993-1994: Myrza Kaparov (acting)
- 1994-1997: Roza Otunbayeva
- 1997-2002: Muratbek Imanaliyev
- 2002-2005: Askar Aitmatov
- 2005: Roza Otunbayeva
- 2005-2007: Alikbek Jekshenkulov
- 2007-2009: Ednan Karabayev
- 2009-2010: Kadyrbek Sarbayev
- 2010-2012: Ruslan Kazakbayev
- 2012-2018: Erlan Abdyldayev
- 2018–2020: Chingiz Aidarbekov
- 2020–2022: Ruslan Kazakbayev
- 2022–present: Jeenbek Kulubaev
