= Diplomatic Academy of the Ministry of Foreign Affairs of the Kyrgyz Republic =

Diplomatic training institute in Bishkek, Kyrgyzstan

- Кыргыз Республикасынын Тышкы иштер министрлигинин Дипломатиялык академия (Kyrgyz); Дипломатическая академия Министерства иностранных дел Кыргызской Республики (Russian)
- Other name: DA of the Kyrgyz MFA
- Type: Public
- Established: 2001
- Founder: Ministry of Foreign Affairs of the Kyrgyz Republic
- Rector: Ruslan Rakhimov
- Location: 36, Erkindik Boulevard, Bishkek, Kyrgyzstan; 42.8731°N 74.6057°E
- Language: Russian
- Website: dipacademy.kg

The Diplomatic Academy of the Ministry of Foreign Affairs of the Kyrgyz Republic named after Kazy Dikambaev (Note: Kyrgyz: Кыргыз Республикасынын Тышкы иштер министрлигинин Казы Диканбаев атындагы Дипломатиялык академия, romanized: Kyrgyz Respublikasynyn Tyshky ishter ministrliginin Kazy Dikambaev atyndagy Diplomatialyc academia; Russian: Дипломатическая академия Министерства иностранных дел Кыргызской Республики имени Казы Дикамбаева, romanized: Diplomaticheskaya academia Ministerstva inostrannyh del Kyrgyzskoy Respubliki imeni Kazy Dikambaeva.) (DA of the Kyrgyz MFA) (Note: Kyrgyz: ДА ТИМнин КР, romanized: DA TIMnin KR; Russian: ДА МИД КР, romanized: DA MID KR.) is a higher education institution located in Bishkek, Kyrgyzstan. The academy trains specialists in international relations, diplomacy, law, and world economy.

== History ==
On 18 November 1998, pursuant to Resolution No. 752 of the Government of the Kyrgyz Republic, the Centre for the Training and Professional Development of Diplomatic Personnel was established at the International Academy of Kyrgyzstan. The Centre offered two-week training courses for employees of the Ministry of Foreign Affairs of the Kyrgyz Republic in diplomacy, political science, international relations, and international law.

On 12 June 2001, by Presidential Decree No. 197, On the Diplomatic Academy of the Ministry of Foreign Affairs of the Kyrgyz Republic, the centre was reorganised into the Diplomatic Academy under the Ministry of Foreign Affairs of the Kyrgyz Republic. The Government of the Kyrgyz Republic, represented by the Ministry of Foreign Affairs, served as the academy's founder. In the same year, the academy admitted its first students.

On 3 September 2001, Resolution No. 515 of the Government of the Kyrgyz Republic approved the Regulations on the Diplomatic Academy and its organisational structure. On 30 August 2002, the academy's organisational structure was approved by Government Resolution No. 597.

On 13 September 2013, pursuant to Government Resolution No. 512, the institution was named in honour of Kazy Dikambaev. It was subsequently renamed the Diplomatic Academy of the Ministry of Foreign Affairs of the Kyrgyz Republic named after Kazy Dikambaev.

On 20 February 2020, amendments and additions to the academy's Charter were introduced by Government Resolution No. 104.

On 16 November 2022, further amendments to the institution's Charter were introduced by Resolution No. 631 of the Cabinet of Ministers of the Kyrgyz Republic.

== Structure ==
The structure of the Diplomatic Academy of the Ministry of Foreign Affairs of the Kyrgyz Republic comprises three departments:

- Department of International Relations and Law
- Department of World Economy and International Management
- Department of State and Foreign Languages

The academy also has a Centre for International Relations Analysis, which focuses on international politics and international relations.

== See also ==
- Ministry of Foreign Affairs (Kyrgyzstan)
- Foreign relations of Kyrgyzstan
