= List of ambassadors of Kyrgyzstan to China =

Coordinates: 39.961618°N 116.469394°E

Ambassador of Kyrgyzstan to the People's Republic of China
- Incumbent; Kanaiym Baktygulova since February 20, 2019
- Inaugural holder: Muratbek Imanaliyev
- Formation: 1993

The Kyrgyz ambassador in Beijing is the official representative of the Government in Bishkek to the Government of the People's Republic of China and concurrently accredited as ambassador in Ulaanbaatar (Mongolia), Bangkok(Thailand) and Singapore.

== List of representatives ==
Diplomatic agrément/Diplomatic accreditation	ambassador	Russian language	Observations	Prime Minister of Kyrgyzstan	Premier of the People's Republic of China	Term end
1993	Muratbek Imanaliyev	Муратбек Сансызбаевич Иманалиев		Tursunbek Chyngyshev	Li Peng	1996
November 1996	Marat Saralinov	Марат Уразалиевич Саралинов		Apas Jumagulov	Li Peng	2001
2001	Yerlan Abdyldaev	Ерлан Бекешович Абдылдаев		Kurmanbek Bakiyev	Zhu Rongji	September 12, 2005
2006	Kamil Sultanov	Камил А. Султанов		Felix Kulov	Wen Jiabao	July 24, 2007
July 24, 2007	Kadyrbek Sarbayev	Кадырбек Тельманович Сарбаев		Almazbek Atambayev	Wen Jiabao	January 26, 2009
August 29, 2009	Zheenbek Kulubaev	Жээнбек Кулубаев		Igor Chudinov	Wen Jiabao	
2013	Kanayim Baktygulova	Канайым Джумадиловна Бактыгулова		Zhantoro Satybaldiyev	Li Keqiang	
