= Chingiz Aidarbekov =

Kyrgyz diplomat (born 1977)

- Чыңгыз Айдарбеков
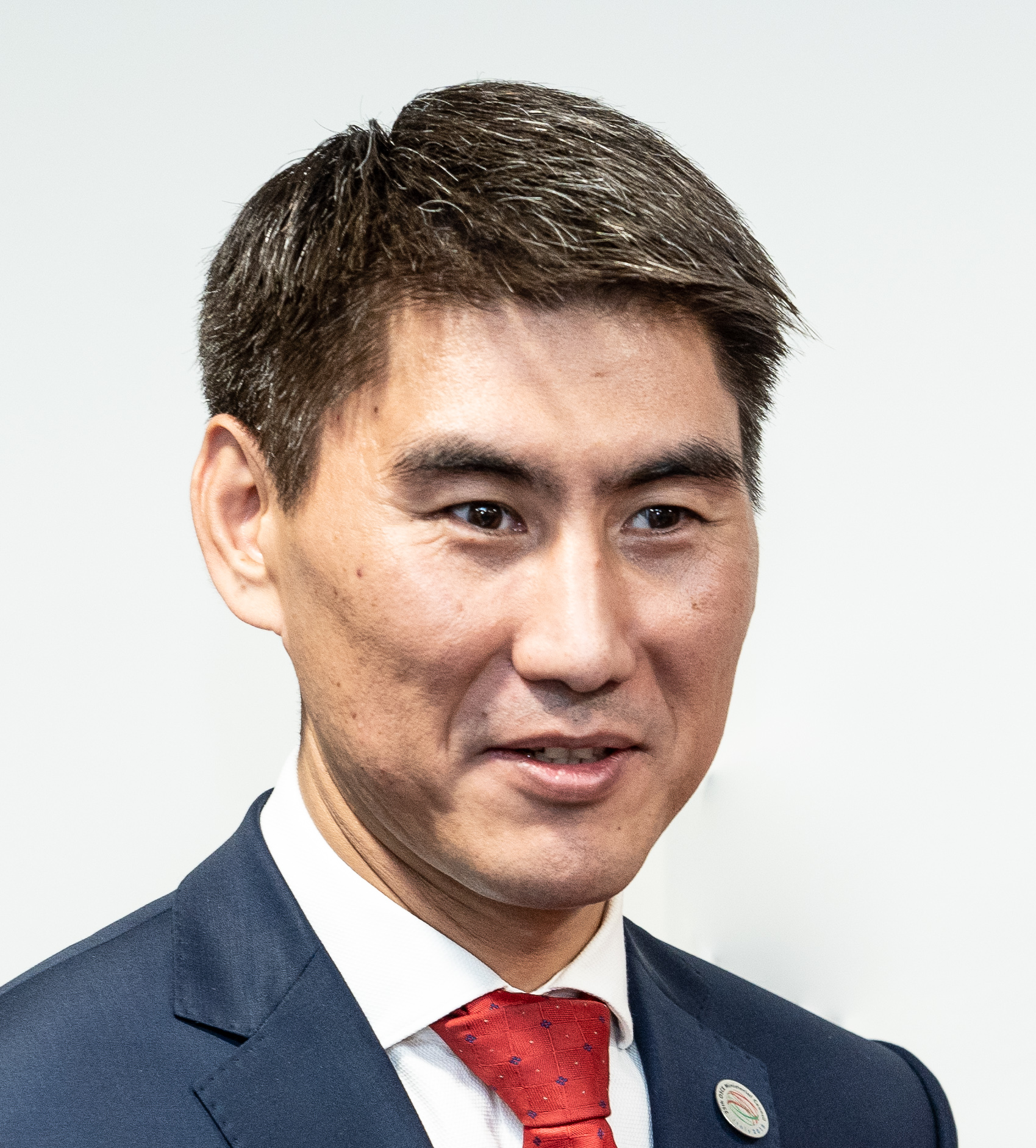
- Aidarbekov in 2018

Minister of Foreign Affairs
- In office 17 October 2018 – 15 October 2020
- President: Sooronbay Jeenbekov
- Prime Minister: Mukhammedkalyi Abylgaziev
- Preceded by: Erlan Abdyldayev
- Succeeded by: Ruslan Kazakbayev

Ambassador of Kyrgyzstan to Japan
- In office 2016–2018
- President: Almazbek Atambayev; Sooronbay Jeenbekov
- Preceded by: Rısbek Moldogaziev

Personal details
- Born: 27 October 1977 (age 49) Frunze, Kirghiz SSR, Soviet Union (now Bishkek, Kyrgyzstan)
- Education: International University of Kyrgyzstan

Chingiz Azamatovich Aidarbekov (Kyrgyz: Чыңгыз Азаматович Айдарбеков, romanized: Chynggyz Azamatovich Aydarbekov; born 27 October 1977) is a Kyrgyz diplomat who was Minister of Foreign Affairs of Kyrgyzstan from October 2018 to October 2020.

== Biography ==
Aidarbekov was born on 27 October 1977, in the city of Frunze (now Bishkek), the capital of the Kyrgyz Soviet Socialist Republic. He began his professional career as an attaché of the Ministry of Foreign Affairs of Kyrgyzstan. He also served until 2005 as the 1st, 2nd and 3rd secretary of the CIS Department of the Ministry of Foreign Affairs. His diplomatic career was launched when he was transferred from Bishkek to the Kyrgyz embassy in Tashkent, working as Chargé d'Affaires for three years. He returned to Bishkek in 2008 to briefly serve as head of the Department of Multilateral Cooperation of the Ministry of Foreign Affairs. Later that year, he would leave the country again to become the Counselor at the Embassy of Kyrgyzstan in Ashgabat, Turkmenistan. In January 2011, Aidarbekov was invited to head the protocol department of the President of Kyrgyzstan and four months later, was made the deputy head of external relations and protocol. President Almazbek Atambayev appointed Aidarbekov as Ambassador of the Kyrgyz Republic to Japan in April 2016. On 17 October 2018, he was promoted to the position of Minister of Foreign Affairs by President Sooronbay Jeenbekov, replacing Erlan Abdyldayev.

On December 29, 2021, he was elected as a deputy of the Supreme Council, and from March 2 to October 20, 2022, he was Chairman of the Committee on International Affairs, Defense, Security and Migration.

== Personal life ==
In his family, he has one sister, as well as his father Azamat and his mother Zifargul. He is also the grandson of Kyrgyz revolutionary and Soviet politician Imanali Aidarbekov. Besides Kyrgyz and Russian, he is also fluent in English.

== Education ==
- 1998 - graduated from the International University of Kyrgyzstan with a degree in international relations
- 2001 - graduated from the International University of Kyrgyzstan with a degree in international law
- 2017 - completed his post-graduate studies at the Kyrgyz-Russian Slavic University
