= Alikbek Jekshenkulov =

Kyrgyz politician (born 1957)

- Аликбек Жекшенкулов

Minister of Foreign Affairs
- In office 2005–2007
- President: Kurmanbek Bakiyev
- Preceded by: Roza Otunbayeva (acting)

Personal details
- Born: May 25, 1957 (age 69) Kyrgyz SSR, Soviet Union
- Party: Akyikat Uchun (For Justice)
- Education: Ukrainian Agricultural Academy; Diplomatic Academy of the Ministry of Foreign Affairs of Russia
- Occupation: Politician

Alikbek Jekshenkulov (born 25 May 1957) is a Kyrgyz politician. He was Foreign Minister of Kyrgyzstan from 2005 and 2007, and now serves as the leader of the oppositional party "Za spravedlivost" ('For Justice').

== Career ==
In 1980 he finished Ukrainian Agricultural Academy as engineer for forest economy. Later in 1999 he graduated at the Diplomatic Academy of the Ministry of Foreign Affairs of the Russian Federation with a doctor of political sciences.

1980-1982 he was head of a section of the State committee for forest economy. Then he started his political career in the Communist Youth Movement Comsomol. 1982-1986 he was Secretary, then First Secretary of the Comsomol of the Alamedin Rayon. 1986-1988 he was already Secretary of the CK of the Komsomol of Kyrgyzstan. 1988-1990 he was First Secretary of the Osh Rayon Comsomol.

1990-1992 he was Deputy Head, then First Deputy of the State Committee for Youth Affairs.

1992 he became a referent in the Аpparatus of the President of the Kyrgyz Republic. 1992-1994 he was Head of the Standing Parliamentary Commission for international and interparliamentary relations.

1994-2000 he became Deputy, then First Deputy Foreign Minister of Kyrgyzstan.

Since 2000, he was ambassador of Kyrgyzstan in Austria, Permanent Representative at the international organizations in Vienna and later also at the OSCE.

Since 14 January 2004 he became Head of the Foreign Policy Section and Deputy Head of the Administration of the President of Kyrgyzstan.

=== Foreign minister ===
In September 2005, he was named Foreign Minister of Kyrgyzstan, nominated by President Kurmanbek Bakiyev and confirmed by the Parliament. He was a compromise candidate as the acting foreign minister, Bakiyev's first choice, Roza Otunbayeva was not confirmed by Parliament. Jekshenkulov has been a foreign policy advisor to both Presidents – Askar Akayev and Kurmanbek Bakiyev.

During his time in office were held negotiations with the Americans about Ganci U.S. Base at Manas airport which ended in June 2006 inconclusively. But Foreign Minister Jekshenkulov suggested the dispute was not just about the rent. He listed "ecology, security, and taxes" among the other sticking points that were examined during the past two days.

During his state visit to China in June 2006 Kyrgyz President Kurmanbek Bakiev was accompanied by Economics Minister Akylbek Zhaparov and Foreign Minister Alikbek Jekshenkulov. They signed several agreements of cooperation between both countries.

Another highlight of his career was his visit with Kyrgyz President Kurmanbek Bakiyev to Uzbekistan, the first meeting after ten years between a Kyrgyz President and the Uzbek President Islam Karimov on 3–4 October 2006. The two presidents exchanged views on a large number of political, economic, cultural and humanitarian issues. Jekshenkulov and Karimov signed six agreements, among them the most important on natural gas deliveries from Uzbekistan to Kyrgyzstan. According to Kyrgyzstan's Foreign Ministry, they discussed cooperation "against terrorism, separatism, and narco-trafficking".

Kyrgyz acting Foreign Minister Alikbek Jekshenkulov on a visit to Russia in mid January 2007 met with members of the Kyrgyz diaspora in Moscow. Jekshenkulov told them he suggested to his Russian interlocutors that they authorize up to 500,000 Kyrgyz nationals to work in the country this year. Jekshenkulov said he discussed with his Russian counterpart Sergei Lavrov, the possibility of granting citizens of both countries dual citizenship. He said he received encouraging signals from Lavrov.

He retreated from his post as Foreign Minister of Kyrgyzstan in February 2007.

=== Opposition leader ===
Since May 2007 he became director of the International Agency of Development and Politics (IADP), located in Bishkek, which was founded by representatives of Russia, Germany, Kazakhstan and Kyrgyzstan.

The main Kyrgyz opposition parties have held their joint gathering in Bishkek on 29 November 2008 under the title People's Grand Congress. The one-day congress, bringing together more than 1,200 delegates, was organized by opposition parties including the Akyikat Uchun (For Justice) Movement, Ata Meken (Fatherland) Socialist Party, and the Ak Shumkar (White Falcon) Party. On the eve of the convention, Alikbek Jekshenkulov, the leader of the For Justice movement and a former foreign minister, told RFE/RL's Kyrgyz Service that the main agenda of the congress was to evaluate the current political and economic situation in Kyrgyzstan and discuss new concepts for further development.

Since 24 December 2008 he became member of the Politbureau of the "United People's Movement" and a leader of the oppositional Party "Akyikat Uchun" (Russian: "Za Spravedlivost", engl.: "For Justice").

Jekshenkulov (as well with his family and his followers) was hampered several times by the law enforcement agencies for holding allegedly illegal rallies, for misuse of office during his time as Foreign Minister and for supposed involvement in crimes.

On 9 March 2009 he was even arrested by police in Bishkek. He was suspected being involved in killing the Turkish businessman Servet Cetin. Nearly a year later on 16 March 2010 he was sentenced to five years imprisonment on probation. But the Bishkek court did not found evidence of his participation and motives in the murder.

Political offices
Preceded by {{{before}}}	Foreign Minister of Kyrgyzstan; 2005–2007	Succeeded by {{{after}}}
