= Muratbek Imanaliyev =

Kyrgyzstani politician (born 1956)

- Муратбек Иманалиев
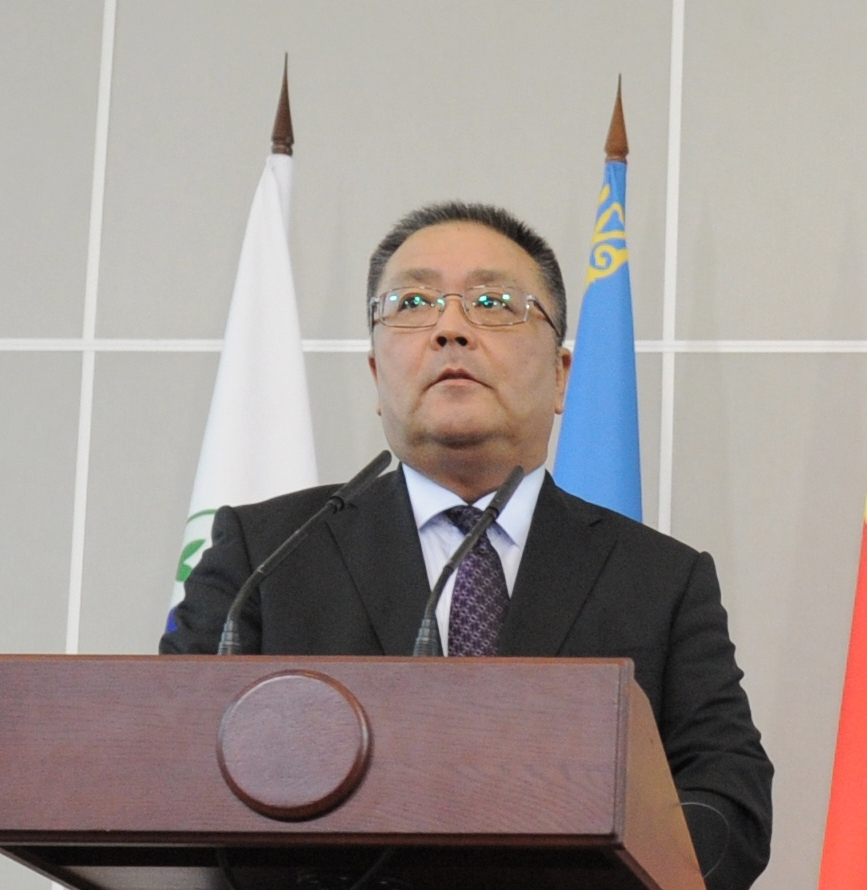
- Imanaliyev in 2011

Secretary-general of the Shanghai Cooperation Organisation
- In office 1 January 2010 – 31 December 2012
- Preceded by: Bolat Nurgaliyev
- Succeeded by: Dmitry Mezentsev

Minister of Foreign Affairs of the Kyrgyz Republic
- In office July 1997 – June 2002
- Preceded by: Roza Otunbayeva
- Succeeded by: Askar Aitmatov
- In office 1991–1992
- Preceded by: Zhanyl Tumenbayeva (as Minister of Foreign Affairs of the Republic of Kyrgyzstan)
- Succeeded by: Roza Otunbayeva

Ambassador of Kyrgyzstan to the People's Republic of China
- In office 1993–1996
- Preceded by: Office established
- Succeeded by: Marat Saralinov

Personal details
- Born: 25 February 1956 (age 70) Frunze, Kirghiz SSR, USSR
- Education: Institute of Asian and African Countries - Moscow State University

Muratbek Sansyzbayevich Imanaliyev (Russian: Муратбек Сансизбаевич Иманалиев; born 25 February 1956) is a Kyrgyz politician who served as the foreign minister of Kyrgyzstan from 1991 to 1992 and from 1 July 1997 to 2002. He was also the secretary-general of the Shanghai Cooperation Organisation from 2010 to 2012.

== Early life and education ==
Imanaliyev was born on 25 February 1956 in Frunze (now Bishkek), Kirghiz SSR, USSR. He graduated from the Institute of Asian and African Countries, Moscow in 1978 and earned his postgraduate degree from the Institute of Oriental Studies of the Russian Academy of Sciences in 1982, where he specialised in Chinese language translation and history. He speaks Kyrgyz, Russian, English and Chinese.

== Career ==
- From 1991 to 1992 he was foreign minister of Kyrgyzstan
- From 1993 to 1996 he was ambassador in Beijing.
- From 1996 to 1997 he was head of the International Department of the Administration of the president of Kyrgyzstan.
- From 1997 to 2002 he was foreign minister of Kyrgyzstan.
- From 2002 to 2007 he was professor at the American University of Central Asia.
- In November 2004, he became a co-founder of the movement "Zhany Bagyt" ("New Course").
- From 2005 to 2009 he was president of the Institute of Public Policy.
- From 1 January 2010 to 31 December 2012 he was the general secretary of the Shanghai Cooperation Organisation.

Imanaliyev is the author of over 100 publications in Russia, China, Turkey, India, Kazakhstan and Kyrgyzstan.

== Personal life ==
Imanaliyev is married and has two children.
