= Kyrgyz Television =

Public Broadcasting Corporation of Kyrgyzstan

National Broadcasting Corporation of the Kyrgyz Republic (KTRK)
- Type: Broadcast radio and television
- Availability: National; International
- Founded: 1931; 95 years ago
- Headquarters: Bishkek, Kyrgyzstan
- Owner: Government of Kyrgyzstan
- Key people: Ilim Karypbekov (General Director)
- Official website: www.utrk.kg
- Language: Kyrgyz, Russian

KTRK or the National Broadcasting Corporation of the Kyrgyz Republic (Kyrgyz: Коомдук телерадиоберүү корпорациясы, romanized: Koomduk teleradioberueue korporaciyaseu) is the Kyrgyzstan government's public broadcasting corporation, headquartered in Bishkek.

The state-run corporation includes 6 TV channels and 3 radio channels, with the corporation having more than 1000 employees. KTRK has news "Ala-Too 24", sports "KTRK Sport", music "Music", children's education "Balastan", news "Birinchi", culture "Kyrgyz radiosu", and entertainment "Min Kiyal FM“ channels. Radio broadcasts commenced in 1931 while the TV broadcasts began in 1958.

== History ==
1931–1938

On January 20, 1931, the official opening of Kyrgyz radio was done, with a radio-node 25 kilometers long was completely commissioned, with a subscriber network of 300 radio points. In 1930, construction began of a standard radio node which finished and was fully operational in 1931 in Bishkek (Formerly Frunze).

Under Soviet rule Kyrgyz radio played an important role in the life of the Kyrgyz people. At the time like other forms of media it was an instrument of propaganda and was ideologically motivated. Still it carried the necessary information and brought cultural diversity of the country to the listeners.

In 1926, the Kyrgyz Autonomous region was transformed into the Kyrgyz Autonomous Soviet Socialist Republic. In this regard, in order to spread the news about the event throughout the entire territory of the country, they raised an initiative of universal radio service. In 1927, this idea was realized, and during the Kurultai of the Central Executive Committee of the Kyrgyz ASSR, the people heard the report of Abdykadyr Orozbekov, chairman of the committee, on the radio nodes.

On December 19, 1931, at the People's Commissariat of Soviets of the Kyrgyz ASSR, the Committee on Broadcasting was formed. According to the regulations of the Central Executive Committee, order No. 1 of December 20, 1931, Bektursunov Suyuntbek was appointed as a Chairman of the Republican Committee for Broadcasting, who worked at his post until July 1932. Further, his place is occupied by Kypchakbaev, Sarmanov. Despite the short period of their work, they were the first initiators to conduct cognitive and instructive hearings through radio.

=== 1938–1945 ===
The first employees of the Kyrgyz radio were composer Kalyk Akiyev and musician Pyotr Shubin. The first radio announcers were state figure Sakin Begmatova, artist Aliman Zhangorozova, and writer Kasymaly Bektenov. From 1938 to 1941 poet Tolon Shamshiev was appointed as a chairman of the radio committee. The importance of radio increased during the Great Patriotic War, and soon became the most dominant source of information. In 1945, on March 28, the Committee on Radio Broadcasting was reorganized under the Council of Ministers of the Kyrgyz ASSR.

=== 1945–1964 ===
From 1949 to 1953, the Committee on Broadcasting was headed by playwright and public figure Moldogazy Tokobayev. Because of the control of all radio communication had been transferred to the Ministry of Communications of the Kyrgyz ASSR, the Committee on Radio Broadcasting passed under the leadership of the Council of Ministers of the Kyrgyz ASSR.

In 1958, under the Council of Ministers of the Kyrgyz ASSR, the Committee on Television and Radio Broadcasting were established, and the Frunzean TV studio started. The first speaker of the Kyrgyz television was Sinakan Zhunushalieva, the first director was Januzak Moldobaev, the first editor was Sharsheke Smatov, the first sound engineer was Svetlana Varibada, and the first operator was Kurmanbek Ogobaev. It was already broadcasting five days a week in 1960. In the Frunze area alone, viewers were also able to receive the Alma-Ata station. Kyrgyz Television produced programming directed mainly at the agricultural and textile sectors.

=== 1964–1985 ===
From 1961 to 1964 the Broadcasting Committee was headed by Aiymbubu Botokanova. Since 1964, the Television and Radio Committee under the Council of Ministers of the Kyrgyz SSR was headed by Asanbek Tokombaev, who had been the head of the state ideological institution for 21 years. Under Asanbek Tokombaev the Television and Radio Committee expanded and became a full-fledged information channel. The administrative building of the Television and Radio Corporation, the Radio House and the television studio building were built during Asanbek Tokombaev's lead. The first color tests began in Kyrgyzstan in 1974, but full-color broadcasting didn't arrive until 1981.

=== 1985–2007 ===
Since 1985 to 1986 the committee was headed by Asanbek Stamov. Since 1986 to 1991 by Umtul Orozova. In 1991 the State Agency on Television and Radio of the Kyrgyz Republic was organized, at the head of which Satybaldy Jeenbekov was appointed. In 1992 Tugolbai Kazakov was appointed as the head, in 1993 Kadyrkul Omurkulov was appointed. In the same year, the agency was again reorganized into a Committee. In 1994 Abdulamit Matisakov was appointed as head. In 1995 Kyrgyz television opened the studio of the morning program “Zamana”.

In 1996, the State Television and Radio Committee was reorganized into the State Broadcasting Corporation of the Kyrgyz Republic, head of which was appointed Amanbek Karypkulov. Then there were opened information center "Ala-Too", the producer center "Nur", and "Ata-Jurt" in the State Broadcasting Corporation. In 2001, Moldoseyit Mambetakunov was appointed as a president of the corporation, and in 2002 Toktosh Aitikeeva. In 2003 the State Television and Radio Corporation of the Kyrgyz Republic acquired the status of the National Broadcasting Corporation of the Kyrgyz Republic. In 2004, Syartbai Musayev was appointed as a president of the corporation, in 2005 Sultan Abdrakmanov, and in the same year Kyas Moldokasymov was appointed as a president.

=== 2007–2010 ===
In 2007 Melis Eshimkanov was appointed as a general director of the corporation, which changed in 2009 to Kaiyrgul Orozbai Kyzy, then it changed again in 2010, after the April Revolution, to Kubat Otorbaev. During this same time, the corporation acquired the status of the Public Broadcasting Corporation of the Kyrgyz Republic, being signed by the president of the Kyrgyz Republic at the time. In 2010 there was an election for the supervisory board of the Public Broadcasting Corporation, which includes 15 members, which Elvira Sarieva was elected as a chairman of the supervisory board. In December 2010 according to the results of a contest, Kubat Otorbaev had been elected as a General Director of KTRK for another 5 years.

=== 2011–2017 ===
In July 2014, Kubat Otorbaev applied for resignation at his own request, which was adopted by a majority vote of the KTRK Supervisory Board. The supervisory board assigned the duties of the corporation's General Director to the well-known journalist Sultanbek Zhumagulov, who at that time was the head of the television channel “ElTR”.

On November 23, 2014, Sultanbek Zhumagulov was elected for the post of General Director. Zhumagulov as the General Director of KTRK, the news block of the channel was updated, and a new Osh TV studio was opened. After his resignation, the supervisory board of the Public Broadcasting Corporation assigned the duties of the General Director on Ilimbek Karypbekov. On March 19, 2015, Ilimbek Karypbekov was appointed as a General Director of KTRK with an absolute majority of votes of the members of the supervisory board. As a chairman of the supervisory board was elected poet and TV journalist Abdy Satarov.

Currently, the corporation has 6 TV channels: “Public First Channel”, “KTRK Music”, “Madaniyat-Taryh-Til”, “Balastan”, "KTRK Sport" and "Ala-Too 24". There are 5 radio stations in the KTRK: “Birinci Radio”, “Kyrgyz Radiosu”, “Min Kyal FM”, “Dostuk” and “Baldar FM”. The corporation includes the Republican Radio Telecentre, and the studio "Kyrgyztelefilm".

=== 2022–Present ===
The Public Broadcasting Corporation (OTRK) became the National Television and Radio Broadcasting Corporation (NTRK) in May 2022.

== TV channels ==
=== KTRK Sport ===
“KTRK Sport” is the first sports channel in Kyrgyzstan, which is part of the television family of the National Television and Radio Broadcasting Corporation. The channel is geared towards creation and distribution of television products on sports topics. The channel is designed to promote development of sport in the country, healthy lifestyles, and attract younger generations to sports. Broadcasting the sport competitions is the basis of the broadcasting policy of the “KTRK Sport” channel, it occupies more than 50% of the airtime of the channel.

=== Balastan ===
"Balastan” is the first children's TV channel in Kyrgyzstan. It has been broadcasting since October 1, 2013. The channel has an educational theme, and is oriented for children and their parents, with the channel presenting developing children's programs. It broadcasts via cable channels in the Chui, Osh, and Jalal-Abad regions. Beginning January 2014, the channel began to broadcast in the Batken region.

=== Ala-Too 24 ===
The first round-the-clock informational channel in Kyrgyzstan “Ala-Too 24” began broadcasting on September 12, 2016. The TV channel is the part of the digital television family of the National Television and Radio Broadcasting Corporation. The basis of the channel is, informational, analytical, cultural and educational programs.

=== KTRK Music ===
“KTRK Music” is the main music channel in Kyrgyzstan, which has been broadcasting since October 1, 2012. “KTRK Music” broadcasts through satellite and cable networks of the country.

=== Madaniyat.Taryh.Til ===
"Madaniyat.Taryh.Til" is a mainly patriotic channel, which broadcasts on various topics relating to Kyrgyzstan, such being music, art, literature, cultural, education.

== Radio stations ==
=== Birinchi Radio ===
"Birinchi Radio" is one of the main and first radio stations of the country. It is geared towards general news, and operates in all regions on ultra-short waves, in real-audio mode on the Internet and satellite, and in FM waves.

=== Dostuk ===
"Dostuk" operates on the KTRK website. It provides general news and other topics including literature, music, and cinema. Its programs being available in the local central Asian languages and Russian.

=== Baldar FM ===
“Baldar FM” is dedicated to children and teenagers under 16 years of age, it's themed to be educational.

=== Min-Kiyal FM ===
Min-Kiyal FM is one of the music and entertainment channels in KTRK. “Min Kiyal FM” radio station is focused on modern music for adults.

=== Kyrgyz Radiosu ===
"Kyrgyz Radiosu" is geared towards culture and education, with it being aimed at an older audience.

== See also ==
- Media in Kyrgyzstan
