= Erlan Abdyldayev =

Kyrgyz diplomat (born 1966)

- Эрлан Абдылдаев
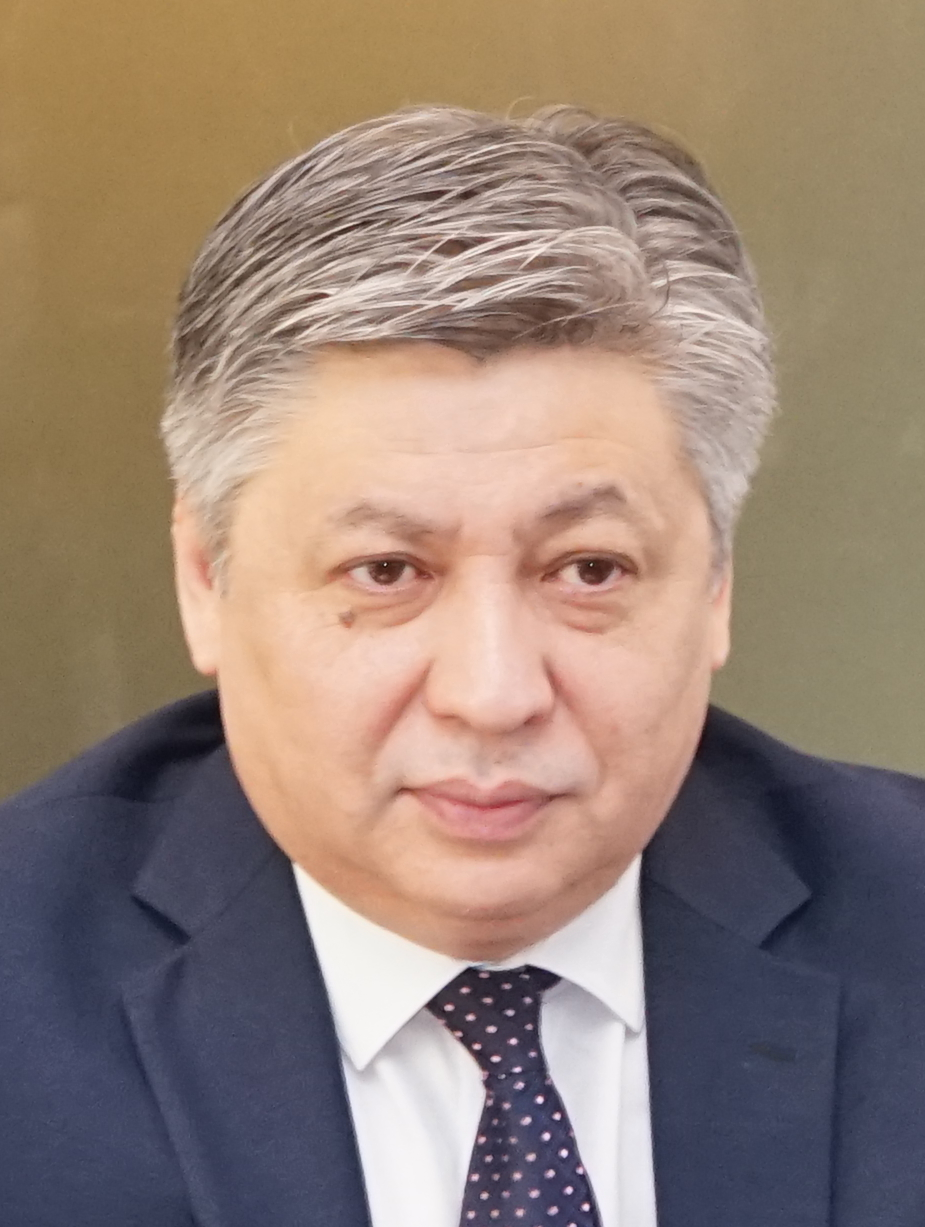
- Abdyldayev in 2017

Minister of Foreign Affairs
- In office 6 September 2012 – 12 October 2018
- President: Almazbek Atambayev; Sooronbay Jeenbekov
- Preceded by: Ruslan Kazakbayev
- Succeeded by: Chingiz Aidarbekov

Personal details
- Born: 21 June 1966 (age 60) Alma-Ata, Kazakh SSR, Soviet Union
- Children: 1
- Parent: Bekesh Abdyldayev (father)
- Education: Moscow State Institute of International Relations

Erlan Bekeshovich Abdyldayev (Kyrgyz: Эрлан Бекешович Абдылдаев; born 21 June 1966) is a Kyrgyz diplomat who served as the Minister of Foreign Affairs of Kyrgyzstan from 2012 to 2018.

== Biography ==
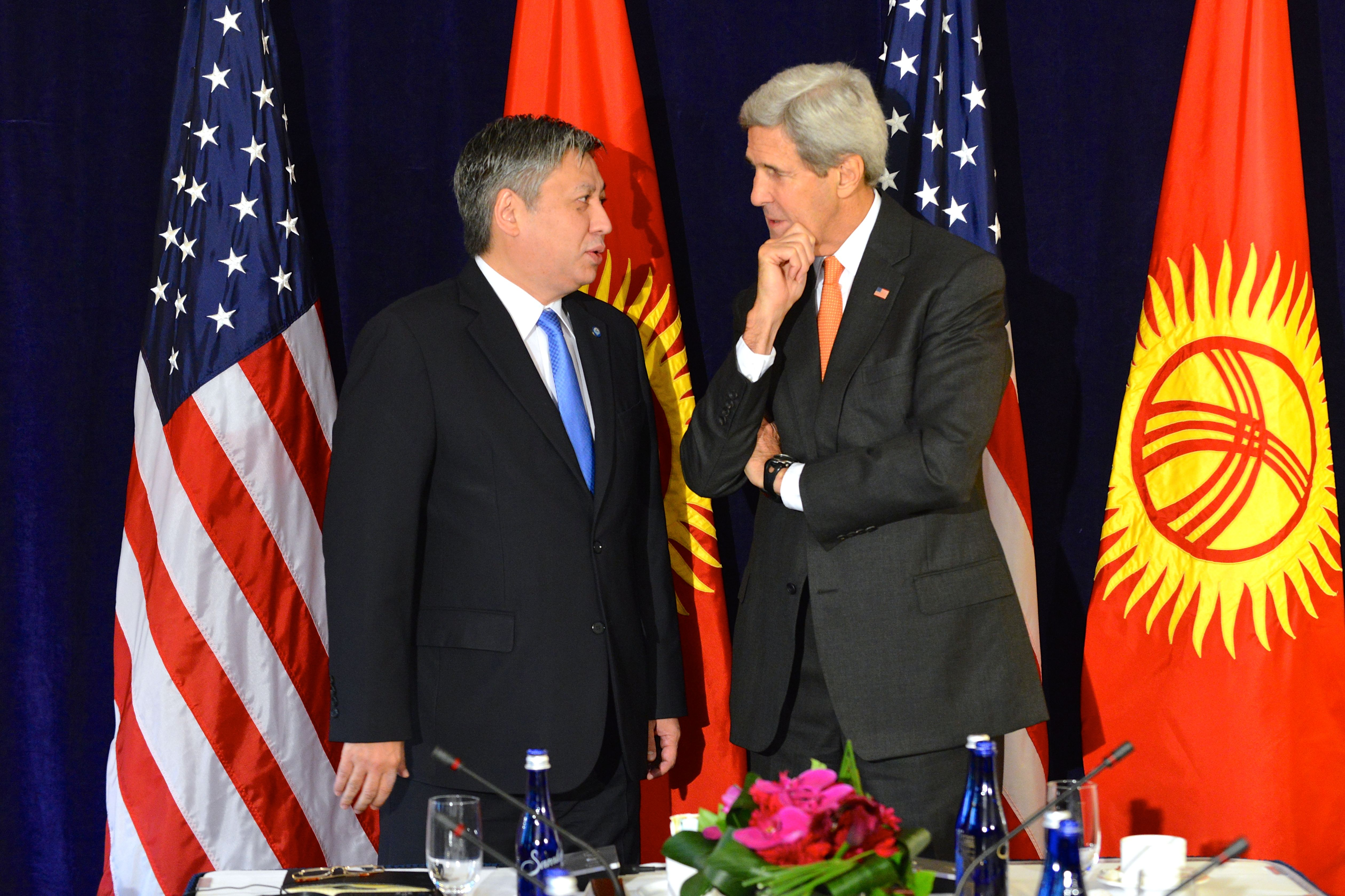
U.S Secretary of State John Kerry speaks with Abdyldaev before their meeting in New York City, U.S., 2 October 2015.

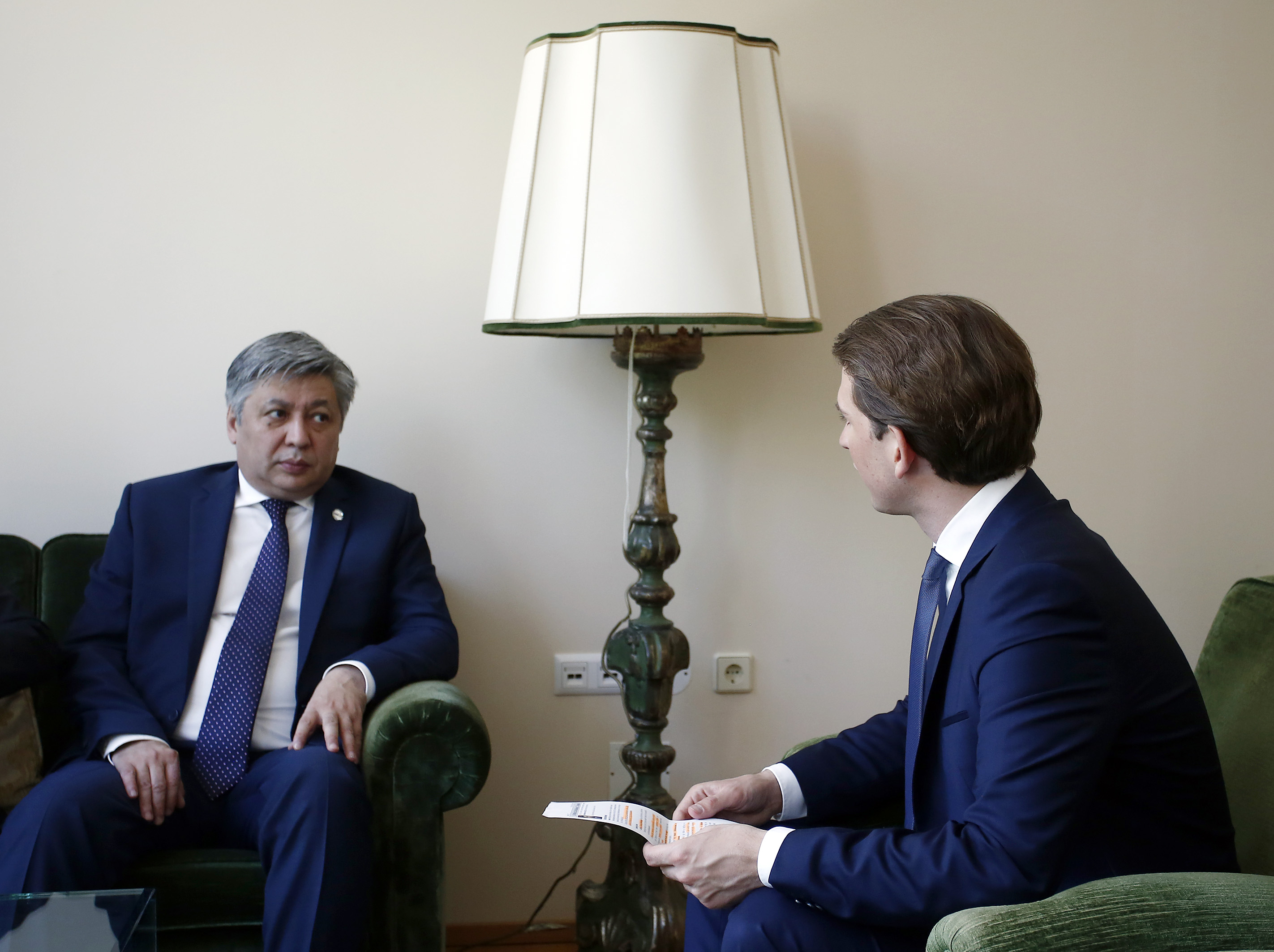
Abdyldaev with Austrian Chancellor Sebastian Kurz in July 2017.

Abdyldayev was born on 21 June 1966 in Alma-Ata, the capital of the Kazakh SSR. In 1989 he graduated from the Moscow State Institute of International Relations. He worked in the embassies of Russia, and China from 1989 to 1994. In 2001, he was appointed Ambassador Extraordinary and Plenipotentiary of Kyrgyzstan to China, and the non-resident ambassador to Mongolia, Singapore, Thailand. On 6 September 2012 president Almazbek Atambayev appointed him Minister of Foreign Affairs of Kyrgyzstan. He was replaced in October 2018 by the Kyrgyz Ambassador to Japan, Chingiz Aidarbekov.

== Personal life ==
His father Bekesh Abdyldayev (1933–2013) was a Soviet and Kyrgyz filmmaker. He is Married with one son. He speaks Russian, Chinese, and English as well as his native Kyrgyz.

== Awards ==
- Order of Friendship (April 2017)
- Honorary Doctor of Moscow State Institute of International Relations (October 2012)
- Honorary Member of the MGIMO Alumni Association

== See also ==
- Ministry of Foreign Affairs (Kyrgyzstan)
