= Kadyrbek Sarbayev =

Kyrgyz diplomat (born 1966)

- Кадырбек Сарбаев
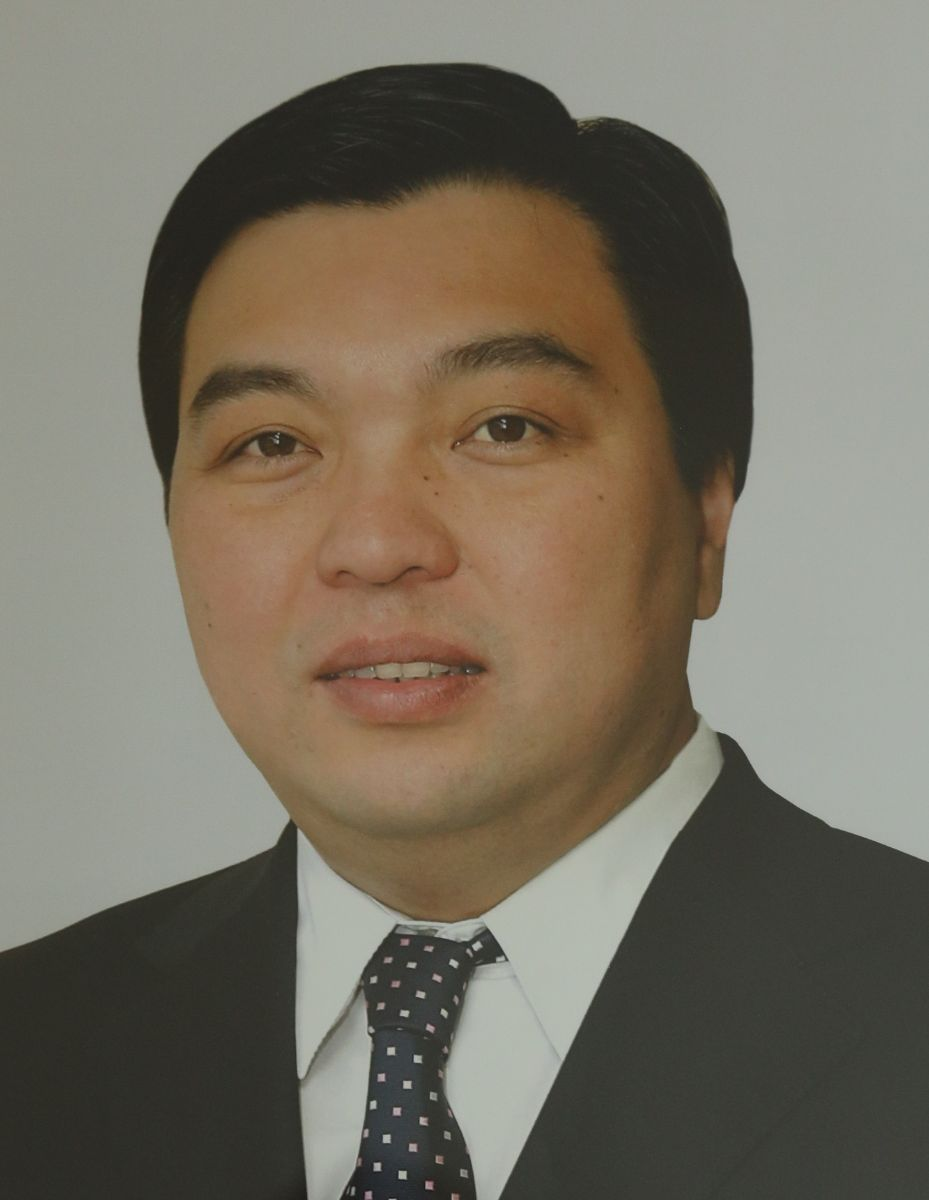

Minister of Foreign Affairs
- In office 25 January 2009 – 15 April 2010
- President: Kurmanbek Bakiyev
- Preceded by: Ednan Karabayev
- Succeeded by: Ruslan Kazakbayev

Ambassador of the Kyrgyz Republic to China
- In office 24 July 2007 – 23 January 2009

Personal details
- Born: 9 December 1966 (age 59) Frunze (now Bishkek), Kyrgyz SSR, Soviet Union
- Education: Far Eastern Federal University

Kadyrbek Telmanovich Sarbayev (Kyrgyz: Кадырбек Тельманович Сарбаев) is a Kyrgyz diplomat who is a former Minister of Foreign Affairs of Kyrgyzstan serving in the position from 25 January 2009, to 15 April 2010. Has the diplomatic rank of Extraordinary and Plenipotentiary.

== Biography ==
Born on 9 December 1966, in the city of Frunze, in the capital of the Kyrgyz SSR. Graduated from the Far Eastern State University, Vladivostok (1992). He speaks Kyrgyz, Russian, Chinese and English. He began his career in 1992 as an attaché of the Ministry of Foreign Affairs of the Kyrgyz Republic.
