= Kasym Tynystanov =

Kyrgyz linguist, poet, and politician (1901–1938)

- Касым Тыныстанов (Kyrgyz)
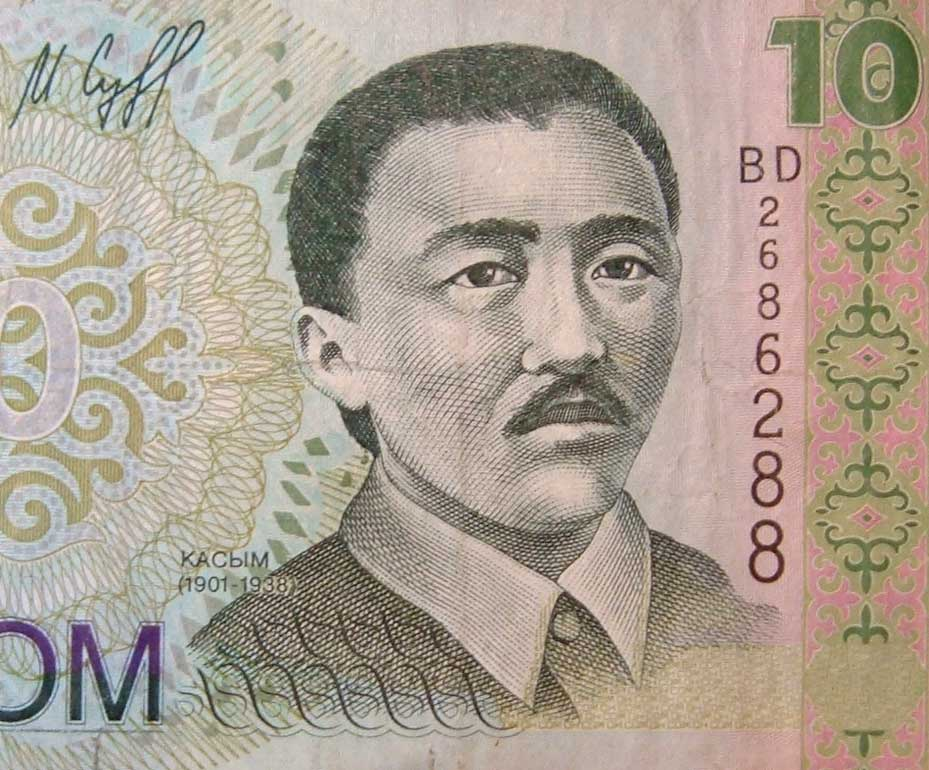
- Kasym Tynystanov, as shown on the Kyrgyz 10 som note.
- Born: 10 September 1901; Chyrpykty, Semirechye Oblast
- Died: November 6, 1938 (aged 37)
- Cause of death: Execution
- Education: Kazakh Institute of Education
- Known for: Creation of the Kyrgyz alphabet
- Scientific career
- Fields: Lexical and grammatical studies
- Workplaces: Kyrgyz Pedagogical Institute
- Thesis: (1936)

Kasym Tynystanov (Kyrgyz: Касым Тыныстанов; 10 September 1901 – 6 November 1938) was a Kyrgyz linguist, politician and poet.

== Early life ==
Tynystanov was born in 1901 in the village of Chyrpykty, Semirechye Oblast (now in the Issyk-Kul Region of Kyrgyzstan). According to his autobiography, he learned to read and write the Arabic alphabet from his father. He went to school between 1912 and 1916 in the villages of Karakol and Sazonovka.

In 1916, after an unsuccessful revolt against Tsarist authorities, Kasym and his parents fled to the Republic of China, along with many other people from Ysyk-Köl. Kasym and his family returned in December 1917. After a period of unsuccessfully attempting to get education in Karakol, he moved to Almaty.

== Linguistic work ==
=== Development of the Kyrgyz alphabet ===
According to historical archives, Kasym began to develop the first Kyrgyz alphabet as a student at Kazinpros. He worked on his alphabet between 1921 and 1926, which was finalised in 1924 and approved in 1927.

In 1924, Kasym Tynystanov and several others formed a Scientific Commission, which developed a Kyrgyz alphabet based on the Arabic script. They created the first Communist Party newspaper in Kyrgyzstan Erkin Too. The day when the first issue of the newspaper was published is considered the birthday of written Kyrgyz language.

On 20 December 1924, at the opening ceremony of the Academic Center at the Department of the People's Education (DPE), Kasym Tynystanov was appointed a Deputy of Ishenally Arabaev, the Chair of the center. The center was created to coordinate research activities of the DPE and supporting its educational activities. The center was, in particular, responsible for the development of research plans, coordination of research activities of DPE institutions, especially related to ethnography and lifestyles, participation in coordination of branch offices of research institutions of the USSR, creation of didactic materials and textbooks, etc. By the end of 1924 came to a conclusion that a Cyrillic- or a Latin-based alphabet would have been be more adequate given language peculiarities. In addition such an alphabet would have been more convenient for the use of publishing equipment at the time. In spring of 1925 Kasym published several articles and convinced the government and the Communist Party in the need of a new script. Kasym made a speech at a Special Convention of Educators in which he analyzed the shortcomings of the existing Arabic based script and presented a new draft Latin based script. As a result of the discussion the Convention decided to include in the agenda of the coming Scientific and Educational Congress the issue of transferring from Arabic-based script to a new Latin based one. The Congress of May 1925 accepted Kasym's proposal and issued a resolution indicating activities related to the process of transfer. The National Scientific Commission created a Society of Supporters of the New Alphabet, chaired by Kasym Tynystanov, which started to promote understanding and use of the new script. In 1926 member of the Turkologists Congress, which took place in Baku, widely supported the idea of adequacy of Latin script to peculiarities of Turkic languages.

After the Turkologists Congress Kasym became a permanent member of the Scientific Council of the USSR's Central Committee on Alphabet Adaptation, which had a mission on transferring the scripts of all Soviet Turkic languages to a Latin-based alphabet. In 1928 Kasym developed an alphabet for the Uyghur language and drafted a Dungan alphabet for the Dungans, living in the Soviet Union. In one and a half year after the Turkologists Congress a Committee for a New Kyrgyz Alphabet is created within DPE, with Kasym as its deputy chair.

In 1928 to meet the lack of periodicals in Kyrgyz, Kasym Tynystanov, Torokul Aytmatov and several others initiated the creation of a first scientific and educational journal Jangy Madaniyat Jolunda. The journal was financed through private contributions by representatives of Kyrgyz intelligentsia. The journal not only promoted the introduction of a new alphabet, but also aimed to improve qualifications of Kyrgyz teachers.

With the creation of the People's Commissariat of Education (now known as the Ministry of Education) in the spring of 1927, Kasym Tynystanov became its first chair (i.e., the Minister of Education) and remained in this position for several years.

When the old Arabic based script was still in use, Kasym published the first textbook Ene Tilibiz ('Our language') which was later published again with minor corrections in new Latin based script. The comparison of the two editions brings one to a conclusion that the only principal difference between the alphabets is the appearance of letters.

In May 1934 on the Republican Orthography Convention presented New Orthography of Kyrgyz Language, which unlike the previous version also included the rules of correct use of Soviet and international term words. The New Orthography was published later that year. Together with Kasym's Punctuation it was approved with minor corrections by the Kyrgyz Government.

Under Kasym's guidance for the People's Commissariat created ethnographic research sub-departments of the Scientific Council the first National Museum and the historic and geographic society, as well as the Committee of the New Alphabet.

=== Lexical and grammatical studies ===
Kyrgyzstan officially joined the USSR as the Karakyrgyz Autonomous Republic in 1924. In 1927, the People's Commissariat and its Academic Center were the two principal institutions responsible for education and science.

In April 1925, the Academic Center temporarily ceased its activities. All functional responsibilities were transferred to the People's Commissariat. Being the Chair of the Commisariat Kasym Tynystanov continued to develop the concepts for coordination of the research and education in Kyrgyzstan. He also initiated various activities on studying Kyrgyz lifestyles and language peculiarities. Earlier, in 1924 after the approval of the new alphabet, Kasym created first Kyrgyz readers (reading books) for the first three grades of primary schools, the Grammar of the Kyrgyz Language, covering the primer, phonetics, morphology, and syntaxes. His Morphology (1934) and Syntaxes (1936) were later published separately as school textbooks.

In November 1928, the first Kyrgyz Research Institute of Regional Studies was opened. This as well as most of Kasym's other initiatives, such as creation of a Literature Bureau, a Didactic Bureau Terminology Commission, and a national Museum, was a very practical effort aimed at formation of Kyrgyzstan into a nation state. These new institutions created fundamental methodologies for the Kyrgyz education system, created the basis for the development of science, etc. Kasym not only coordinated the activities of the Terminology Commission, but was actively involved in creating Kyrgyz terminology. He considered terminology as a separate trend in Kyrgyz language study, so he laid out its main principles and the methods for composition of so-called term systems. Based on these original findings he and his colleagues finalized the Theory for Terminology in Kyrgyz language in 1928.

Alone and as a co-author he created terminological dictionaries on seven subjects, among which were philosophy, social sciences, zoology.

A deep grammar research as well as detailed study of word inflection and formation patterns allowed Kasym to open "morphonology", a new trend in linguistics. Based on the findings related to his study of grammar patterns, he managed create a smart algorithm of word formation, which he expressed in his "Technical table". Using this tool, he prepared a lexical set of 100,000 Kyrgyz words in a short period of time. He selected 56,400 words out of them for further use in dictionaries.

Expert commission of the People's Commissariat of Education in 1932 came to a conclusion that the discovery is fundamental and would have had significant practical and theoretical use.

As Chair of the People's Commissariat, Kasym coordinated and took part in joint expeditions from other Soviet Republics. His publications were based on the analysis of the findings of such expeditions. As a result of his dialectological research he created an orthographic system. His analysis of Moldo Niyaz's Datka Aiym became the first sample of a textual study.

=== Preservation of Kyrgyz oral folklore ===
In 1923, Tynystanov went on an expedition to the eastern shore of Lake Issyk Kul to collect folklore. Later, when he became the Head of the Academic Center and the Chair of the People's Commissariat of Education, he continued to work on the Epic of Manas. Since then, his work concentrated on analyzing, preservation and publishing of Sayakbai Karalaev's and Sagynbai Orozbakov's versions of the Manas epic.

In late 1931, Manas found a reflection in a theatrical performance of in the National Theater. The screenplay was written by Tynystanov. The epos was the main part of the so-called Academic Eves, which consisted of three performances. Kasym wrote that Manas is the source of original Kyrgyz oral poetry and should be considered a part of the world cultural heritage.

== Academic appointments ==
In August 1932, Kasym was appointed acting director of the institute. He also focused on Dungan culture. His colleagues welcomed the creation of a Dungan Sector at the institute, which became the core organ on study and preservation of Dungan culture.

== Later life and death ==
Tynystanov was arrested, as part of Stalin's Great Purge, on 1 August 1938, and was subsequently executed on 6 November the same year. He was posthumously rehabilitated in 1957.

== See also ==
- Iasyr Shivaza
