= Imanali Aidarbekov =

Official portrait.

Imanally Aidarbekov (Kyrgyz: Иманалы Айдарбеков; 1884 - November 5, 1938) was Kyrgyz revolutionary and Soviet politician who was Chairman of the Kara-Kyrgyz Revolutionary Committee from 1924 to 1925.

== Biography ==
Born in 1884 to a poor peasant family, he became a member of the Left Socialist-Revolutionaries in 1917 and a member of the Bolsheviks in 1918. He studied at the Pishpek Agricultural School of Horticulture and briefly at the Tashkent Hydrotechnical School, although he did not graduate. In April 1925, he was appointed plenipotentiary representative of the Kirghiz Autonomous Socialist Soviet Republic in Tashkent. In 1927, he was Chairman of the Central Council of the National Economy and from 1927 to 1929, Chairman of the Main Court of the Kirghiz ASSR. In 1929, he was appointed People's Commissar of Light Industry and of Trade of the Kirghiz ASSR.

On August 16, 1935, he was expelled from the party as a nationalist, arrested on September 4, 1937, after being accused of organizing armed resistance and in November 1938, he was executed in the courtyard of the city prison in the capital of Frunze (now Bishkek). He was rehabilitated in 1958. His grandson Chingiz Aidarbekov was a Kyrgyz diplomat who from 2018 to 2020 was the Minister of Foreign Affairs of the Kyrgyz Republic.

== Awards ==
- Jubilee Badge “100th Anniversary of the Formation of the Kara-Kyrgyz Autonomous Oblast” (February 20, 2025, posthumously)
