= Chyrpykty =

Chyrpykty Kyrgyz: Чырпыкты
- Location within Kyrgyzstan
- Coordinates: 42°30′36″N 76°34′48″E
- Country: Kyrgyzstan
- Region: Issyk-Kul Region
- District: Issyk-Kul District
- Elevation: 1,617 m (5,305 ft)

Population (2023)
  - Total: 2,657
- Time zone: UTC+6

Chyrpykty (Kyrgyz: Чырпыкты) is a village in Issyk-Kul District of Issyk-Kul Region, Kyrgyzstan. Its population was 2,627 in 2021. Scientist Kasym Tynystanov was born in the village.
