= International University of Kyrgyzstan =

State university in Bishkek, Kyrgyzstan

Coordinates: 42.877451°N 74.585494°E

- Кыргызстан эл аралык университети (Kyrgyz); Международный университет Кыргызстана (Russian)
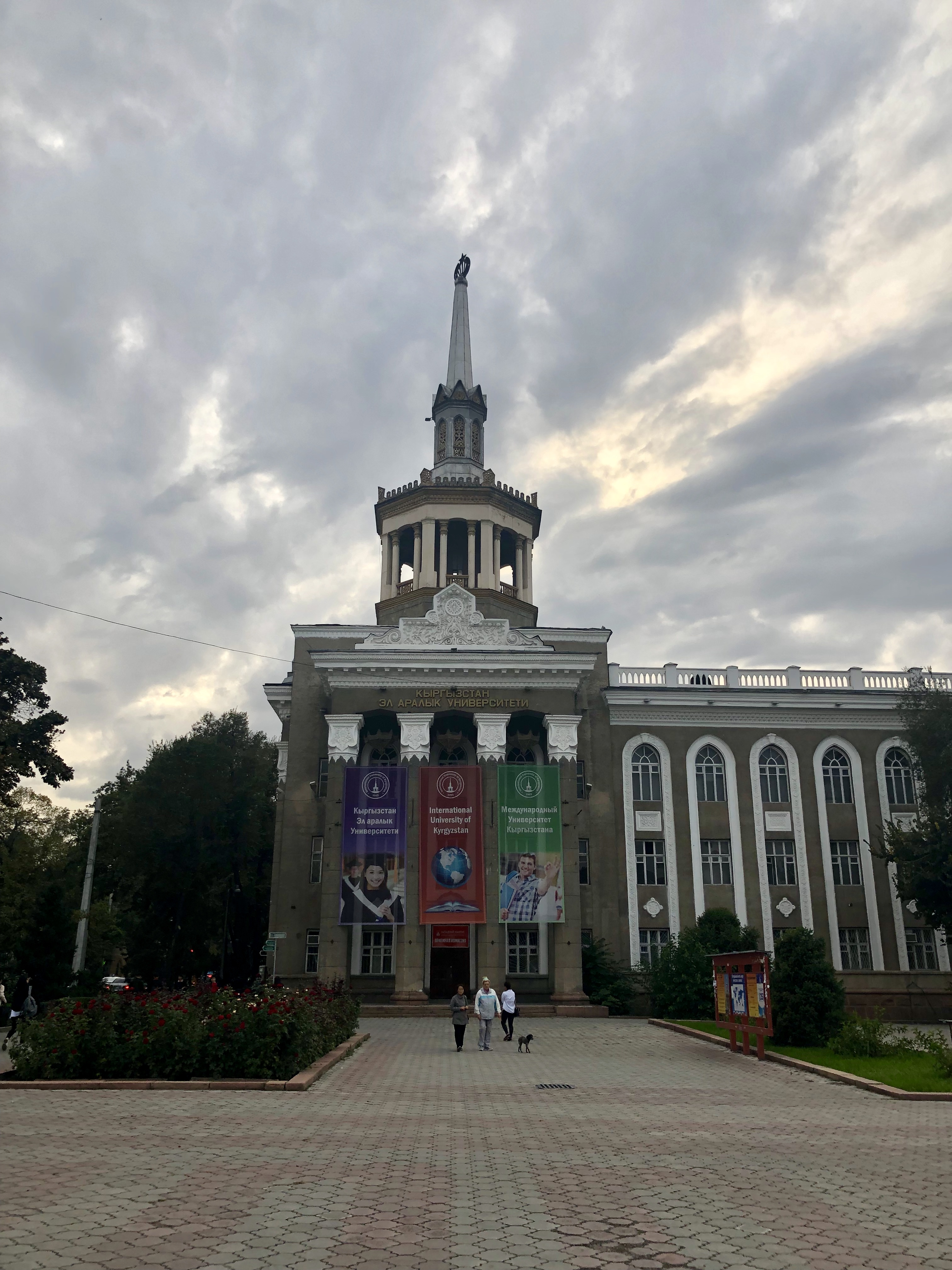
- The main building
- Type: state institutions
- Established: 1993
- Founders: Government of Kyrgyzstan; Ministry of Education and Science of the Kyrgyz Republic Ministry of Foreign Affairs of the Kyrgyz Republic; Kyrgyz Academy of Sciences San Francisco State University
- Affiliations: European Association for International Education European University Association Federation of the Universities of the Islamic World
- Religious affiliation: secular institution
- Administrative staff: 250
- Students: 4,500
- Location: 17A/1, St. Tolstoy, Bishkek, Kyrgyzstan
Colors
- Website: iuk.kg?en

The International University of Kyrgyzstan (Kyrgyz: Кыргызстан эл аралык университети, Russian: Международный университет Кыргызстана) is a state international university in Bishkek, the capital of Kyrgyzstan.

The university was established by decree of the President of the Kyrgyz Republic, Askar Akayev, No. UP-74, on March 11, 1993, and by the enactment of the Government of Kyrgyzstan, No. 113, on March 16, 1993. The founders of the International University of Kyrgyzstan are the Government of Kyrgyzstan, the Ministry of Education and Sciences of the Kyrgyz Republic, the Ministry of Foreign Affairs of the Kyrgyz Republic, the National Academy of Sciences of the Kyrgyz Republic and San Francisco State University in the United States.

In 2021 the Webometrics Ranking of World Universities ranked the instruction as the 5th best among 46 ranked institutions from the country. The reported acceptance rate at the university is 20%.

The International University of Kyrgyzstan is a state university with the status of International Higher Education institution and has a direct relationship to the Government of the Kyrgyz Republic. By the decree of the President of the Kyrgyz Republic on December 30, 1998, and the enactment of the Kyrgyz Republic Government, the International University was given the status of autonomous academic self-management.

== Faculty ==
=== Medicine ===
There is a medicine school "International Higher School of Medicine Kyrgyzstan" under IUK.
