= Sakin Begmatova =

Soviet-Kyrgyzstani Politician

- Сакин Бегматова

Personal details
- Born: 21 August 1921
- Died: 28 June 1981 (aged 59)

Sakin Begmatovna Begmatova (1921-1981) was a Soviet-Kyrgyzstani Politician.

She served as the Minister of Foreign Affairs for the Kirghiz SSR from 1963 to 1980 and the Deputy Chairman of the Council of Ministers of the Soviet Union for the Kirghiz SSR from 1961 to 1980.

== Biography ==
=== Childhood and Early Career ===
Begmatova was born into a large family on 21 August 1921 and was orphaned at the age of 5. She graduated from the Frunze Pedagogical Academy and during her studies worked as a radio announcer for Kyrgyz radio. She then worked as a teacher for several years. In 1941, she became the head of the personnel department of the People's Commissariat food industry. In 1949, she was in charge of the women's department of the Frunze Communist Party of Kirghizia city committee. In 1959, she graduated with distinction from the All-Russian State Distance-Learning Institute of Finance and Economics, after which she was appointed as deputy chairman of the Council of Ministers for the Kirghiz SSR, her native republic.

=== Diplomatic Activity ===
At the beginning of the 1960s, Begmatova frequently travelled around the world, showing the equal status of women in the Soviet Central Asia. The countries she visited included East Germany, India, and Syria. She took part in creating displays for the Kirghiz SSR at international exhibitions, for example at the Expo-67 in Montreal. She was also involved in work with the United Nations in 1964 and in 1969 led the Soviet delegation in one of the committees at the XXIV Series of the UN General Assembly.

Begmatova was a deputy of the Soviet of Nationalities for the Kirghiz SSR at the Supreme Soviet of the Soviet Union from 1962 to 1966.

=== Death ===
She died in a car accident on the 28th June 1981 and is buried at the Ala-Archa Cemetery in Bishkek (formerly Frunze).
