= Roza Otunbayeva =

President of Kyrgyzstan from 2010 to 2011

- Роза Отунбаева
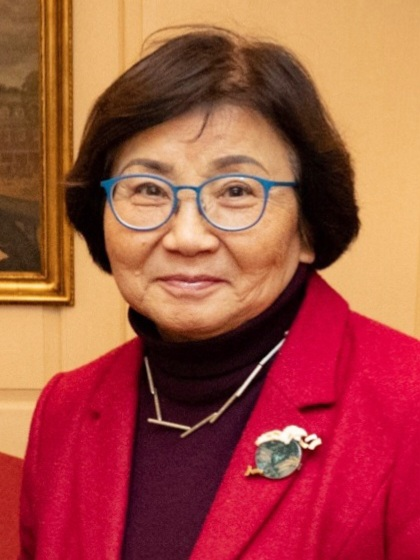
- Otunbayeva in 2022

3rd President of Kyrgyzstan
- In office 3 July 2010 – 1 December 2011; Acting: 7 April – 3 July 2010
- Prime Minister: Almazbek Atambayev; Omurbek Babanov (Acting); Almazbek Atambayev
- Preceded by: Kurmanbek Bakiyev
- Succeeded by: Almazbek Atambayev

Special Representative of the Secretary-General for Afghanistan
- In office 2 September 2022 – 6 September 2025
- Secretary-General: António Guterres
- Preceded by: Deborah Lyons
- Succeeded by: Georgette Gagnon

Minister of Foreign Affairs
- In office 26 February 1992 – 10 October 1992
- Prime Minister: Tursunbek Chyngyshev
- Preceded by: Muratbek Imanaliyev
- Succeeded by: Ednan Karabayev

Ambassador of Kyrgyzstan to the United Kingdom
- In office 1997–2002
- President: Askar Akayev

Deputy Prime Minister of the Kirghiz SSR
- In office 1986–1989
- Prime Minister: Apas Jumagulov
- Preceded by: Jamal Tashibekova
- Succeeded by: Zhanyl Tumenbayeva

Personal details
- Born: 23 August 1950 (age 76) Frunze, Kirghiz SSR, USSR
- Party: Social Democratic Party
- Spouse: Bolot Sadybakasov (div. 1997)
- Children: 3
- Education: Moscow State University
- Website: roza.kg

Roza Isakovna Otunbayeva (Note: Kyrgyz: Роза Исак кызы Отунбаева, romanized: Roza Isak kyzy Otunbaeva, IPA: [ɾózɑ ɪsɑ́q‿qɯzɯ́ otʰʊnpáɪeβə]) (born 23 August 1950) is a Kyrgyzstani politician and diplomat who served as the President of Kyrgyzstan from 7 April 2010 until 1 December 2011, becoming the first female Central Asian head of state. She was sworn in on 3 July 2010, after acting as interim leader following the 2010 April Revolution, which led to the ousting of President Kurmanbek Bakiyev. She previously served as Minister of Foreign Affairs and as head of the parliamentary caucus for the Social Democratic Party of Kyrgyzstan. She is also known for the persecution of human rights activist Azimzhan Askarov and the failed policy that led to the clashes of June 2010.

From 2022-2025, Otunbayeva has been serving as United Nations Secretary-General António Guterres's Special Representative for Afghanistan and Head of the United Nations Assistance Mission in Afghanistan (UNAMA).

== Early life ==
Roza Otunbayeva was born in Frunze (now Bishkek, the capital of Kyrgyzstan), Kirghiz SSR, USSR into the family of Isak Otunbayev, a member of the Supreme Court of Kyrgyz SSR (1967–1992), and Salika Daniyarova (1925–2020), a teacher. She graduated from the Philosophy Faculty of Moscow State University in 1972 and went on to teach as Senior Teacher and then as Head of the Philosophy Department at Kyrgyz State National University for six years (1975–1981).

In 1975, she became Candidate of Sciences after defending her dissertation, "Critique of falsification of Marxist-Leninist dialectic by the philosophers of Frankfurt school".

Otunbayeva is a divorced mother of two children. She is fluent in Russian, English, German and French in addition to Kyrgyz.

== Political career ==
In 1981, she began her political career as the Communist Party's Second Secretary of the Lenin raion council (raikom) of Frunze (now Bishkek). From 1983 to 1986, Otunbayeva served as the Secretary of the City Communist Party Committee in Frunze (now Bishkek). In 1986, she was appointed the Deputy to the Chairman of the Council of Ministers, and the same time the Minister of Foreign Affairs of the Kirghiz Soviet Socialist Republic. In 1989, she was appointed as the Executive Secretary and later as the Chairwoman of the USSR UNESCO National Committee, and she also became member of the USSR Foreign Ministry's Board. From 1989–1992, she served as the Vice-President of the UNESCO Executive Council.

By 1992, the now independent Kyrgyzstan was led by Askar Akayev, who chose her to be Minister of Foreign Affairs and Deputy Prime Minister, positions she held until later that year when she became her country's first ambassador to the US and Canada (1992–1994). In May 1994 she was called back to her original post of Kyrgyz Minister of Foreign Affairs, remaining there for three years. From 1997 to 2002, she served as the first Kyrgyz ambassador to the United Kingdom of Great Britain and Northern Ireland. From 2002 to 2004, she was recruited Deputy Special Representative of the UN Secretary General in the Peacekeeping Mission for Georgia. Upon her return to Kyrgyzstan in late 2004, Otunbayeva became politically active. In December 2004, she and three other opposition parliamentarians founded the Ata-Jurt (Fatherland) public movement in preparation for the February 2005 parliamentary elections.

From March to September 2005, Otunbayeva served as Acting Minister of Foreign Affairs.

=== "Tulip Revolution" ===
Otunbayeva was one of the key leaders of the Tulip Revolution in Kyrgyzstan which led to the overthrow of President Akayev. Subsequently, she served for a few months as Acting Foreign Minister in the interim government of then prime minister (and acting president) Kurmanbek Bakiyev. After Bakiyev was elected President and Feliks Kulov became Prime Minister, Otunbayeva failed to receive the required parliamentary support to become Foreign Minister.

She then ran unsuccessfully in a parliamentary by-election a few months later. Otunbayeva played a key role in the November 2006 protests that pressed successfully for a new democratic constitution.

She was the co-chairwoman of the country's Asaba (Flag) National Revival Party for a short time. In December 2007, Otunbayeva was elected to the Jogorku Kenesh – the Parliament of Kyrgyzstan – on the list of the Social Democratic Party of Kyrgyzstan. She served as the Leader of the Opposition SDP from 2008 to 2010. In 2009 she became the Leader of People's Front opposition.

=== 2010 uprising and presidency ===
On 7 April 2010, she was chosen by opposition leaders as head of the Interim Government of the Kyrgyz Republic, following widespread rioting in Bishkek and the ouster of President Kurmanbek Bakiyev.

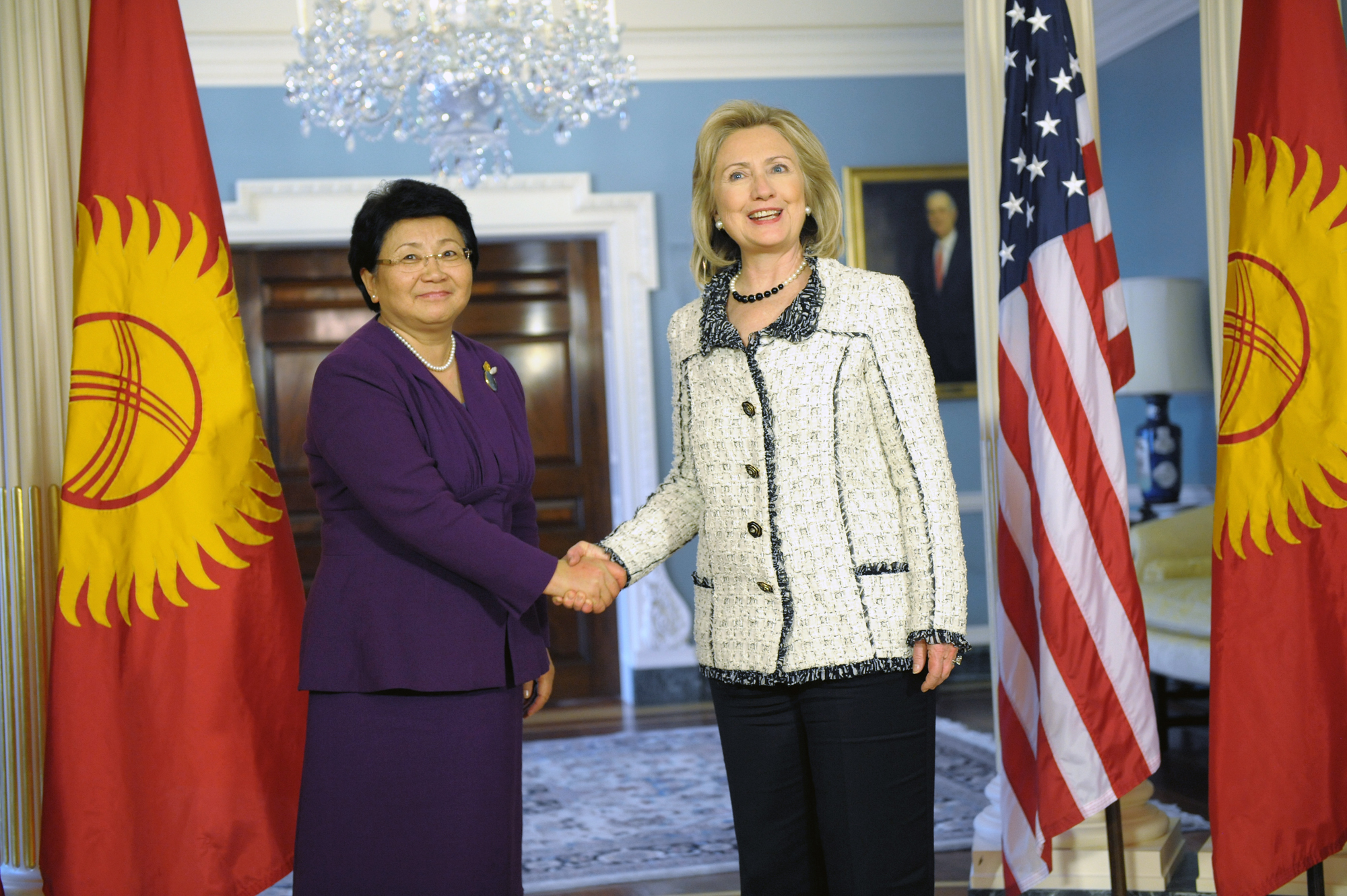
Otunbayeva meets Hillary Clinton (2011)

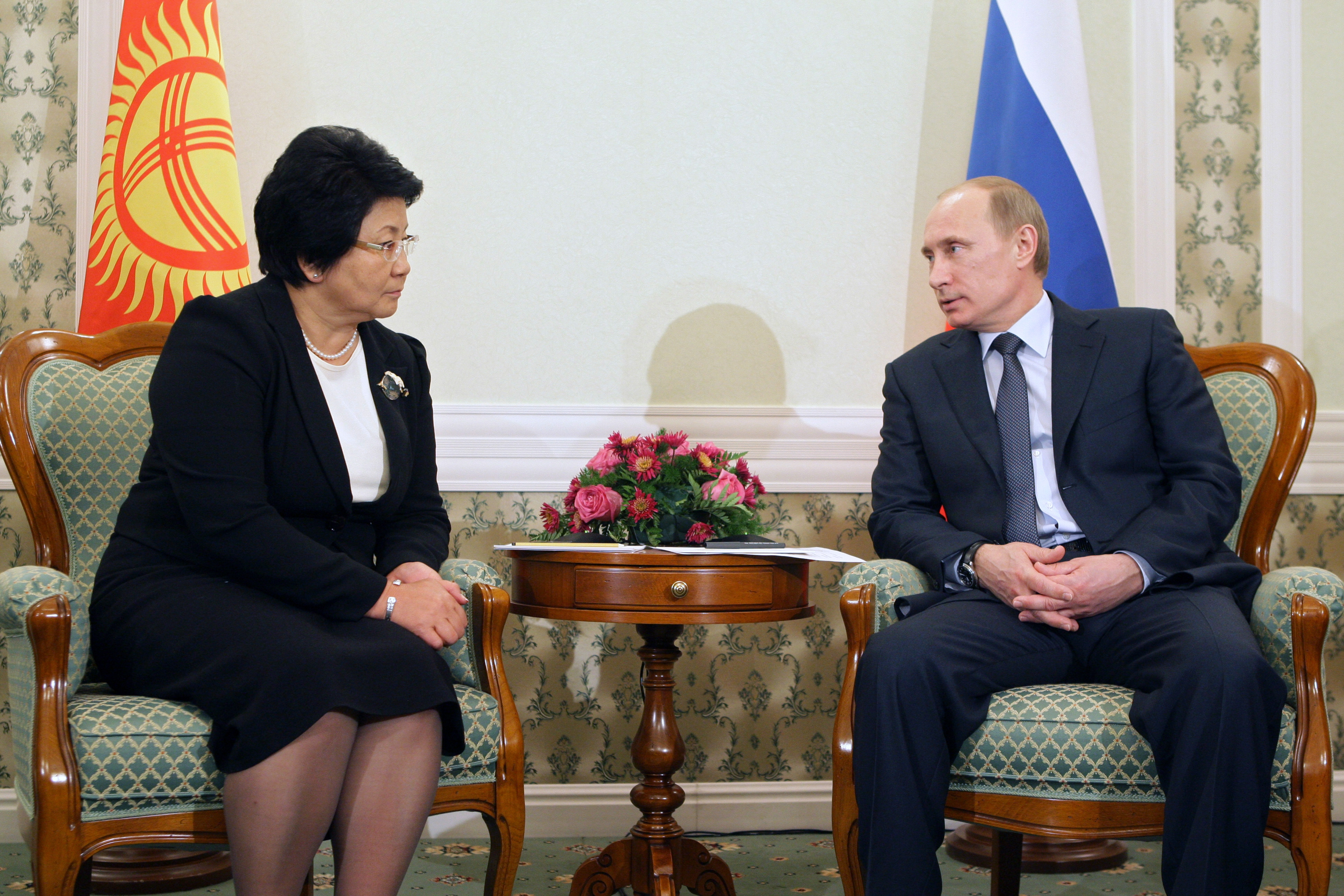
Otunbayeva with Vladimir Putin (2010)

Bakiyev fled the Jalal-Abad area as the riots became more violent. Unable to rally support, he resigned as president on 10 April 2010, and left the country for Kazakhstan. Nine days later he went to Minsk, Belarus, where he was given protected-exile status. On 21 April, he recanted his resignation and declared that he was still president of Kyrgyzstan. Otunbayeva vowed to bring him to trial.

As interim president, Otunbayeva had four male deputies. Otunbayeva is considered to be unusual as there are few women in politics in Kyrgyzstan. Her first conversation after she came to power was with Russian Prime Minister Vladimir Putin. She later stated in the interview:

We share a single information space with Russia, the Russian language is everywhere. We don't want the Russians to leave. Our entire smart technology business is made up of Russian people. My daughter-in-law is Russian. She says: "Mom, I found my roots in Karakol, where my grandparents are from." The people have nostalgia for one big country, because we have suffered over these 15-18 years.

Otunbayeva declared that new elections would be called within six months and that she would act as president until then.

With violent protests in support of ousted President Kurmanbek Bakiyev continuing in Jalalabad, the home city of the former president, it was announced on 19 May 2010, by the interim government that elections would be delayed until 2011 and Otunbayeva was named as president. Following a referendum on the new Kyrgyz constitution, she was sworn in on 3 July 2010. Otunbayeva however was prohibited by the new constitution from running in the 2011 presidential election and her term ended on 31 December 2011.

The referendum was supported by over 90% and changed the government from a presidential republic to a parliamentary republic. Parliamentary elections were held in October and the new parliament elected the Prime Minister and Cabinet.

== Role in ethnic clashes of 2010 ==
In June 2010, a bloody conflict broke out between ethnic Uzbeks and Kyrgyz in southern Kyrgyzstan, during which more than 400 people died and thousands of people lost their homes.

An international commission led by Kimmo Kiljunen condemned the government led by Roza Otunbaeva for inaction and failure to prevent bloodshed in southern Kyrgyzstan:

The provisional government, which took power two months before the events, either did not recognize or underestimated the deterioration in inter-ethnic relations in southern Kyrgyzstan, the provisional government had a special responsibility for ensuring that security agencies were adequately trained and equipped to cope with the situation of civil disobedience. The arguments put forward by President Otunbayeva that the surge in violence was of such proportions that it was difficult for the interim government to contain it does not relieve the authorities of their primary responsibility to protect the population.

The reaction of the authorities under the leadership of Roza Otunbaev was also harshly condemned by Amnesty International, that accused Provisional Government under her leadership in crimes against humanity, torture, unfair trials, involvement of power structures, rape and mass violence:

Investigators and prosecutors have still failed to investigate and bring to justice the huge number of crimes committed during and immediately after the June 2010 riots and in the 24 months since then, most notably murders and other violent crimes against ethnic Uzbeks. In addition, allegations of collusion and complicity of security forces in committing human rights violations during the June events also remained unaddressed. Dozens of reports of rape and other sexual violence were also not addressed.

In May 2011, Roza Otunbaeva's government rejected the conclusion of the International Commission of Inquiry into the June 2010 riots (Kyrgyzstan Commission of Inquiry) that crimes against humanity had been committed against the Uzbek population of the city of Osh during the riots. The OSCE also indicated that violence against Uzbek mahallas was carried out systematically and with the connivance or complicity of law enforcement agencies and the army under the control of Roza Otunbayeva.

=== Reaction in Kyrgyzstan ===
Later, the ex-prosecutor general of Kyrgyzstan reported on criminal cases against human rights activists which began with the direct order of Roza Otunbaeva. Several politicians called Otunbaeva "Black Rose" for her role in ethnic clashes. The trial for the June 2010 events is still ongoing in Kyrgyzstan, and the name of Roza Otunbaeva is voiced repeatedly. Kyrgyz politicians, and especially the leader of the opposition Ata-Zhurt party in parliament, Jyldyzkan Joldosheva, reported that they warned the head of the Provisional Government about the impending ethnic conflict and about Otunbaeva's complete disregard for them.

== Case of Azimjan Askarov and repressions against NGO ==
Following the outbreak of ethnic violence in 2010, dozens of Uzbek community and religious leaders were arrested by the Kyrgyzstan government and accused of inciting ethnic violence, among them Azimzhan Askarov, who had been filming killings and arson attacks during the riots. Askarov then distributed the video to international media and accused the Kyrgyz military of complicity in the killings.

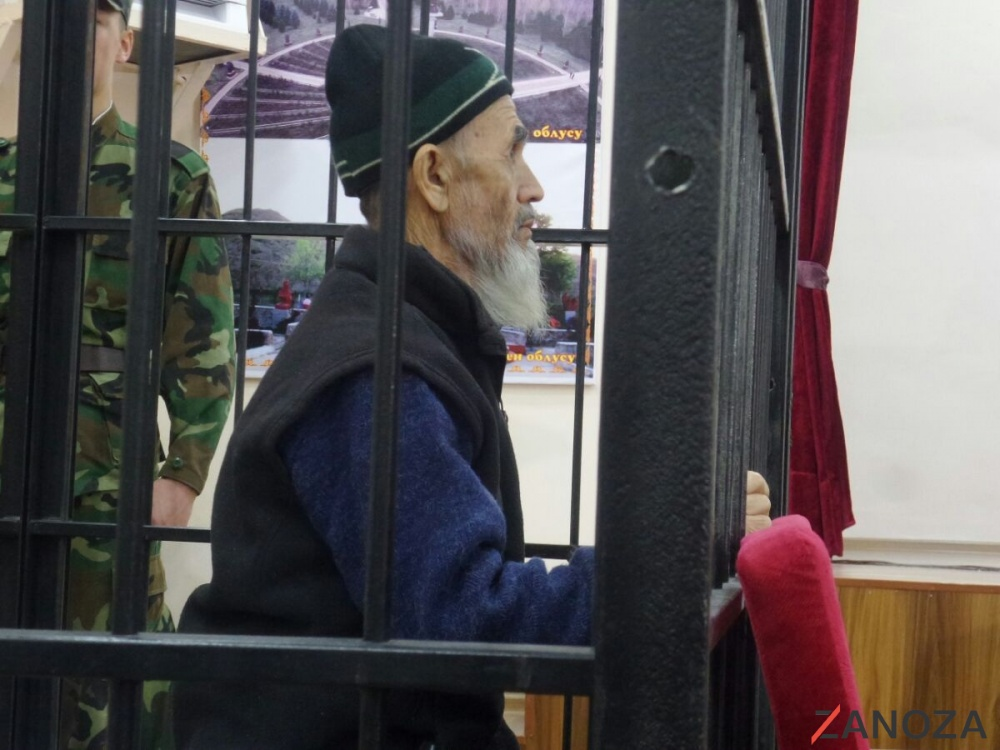
Azimzhan Askarov in prison cell during the trial stated that he was convicted with direct order of Otunbayeva Members of Azimzhan Askarov's family also spoke about Roza Otunbaeva's guilt in their appeals to the UN.

Azimjan Askarov openly stated in the court that he was convicted by direct order of Roza Otunbayeva. Human rights activists reported that they personally spoke to Roza Otunbayeva about the torture of Askarov, but she completely ignored them.

In 2017, Azimzhan Askarov was sentenced to life imprisonment by several Kyrgyz courts for the murder of policeman Maktybek Sulaimanov, who was burned alive, and participation in mass riots in 2010. The term of office of President Roza Otunbayeva expired on December 1, 2011.

Words of Askarov against Otunbayeva were also supported by international commission of International Federation of Human Rights FIDH:

The Observatory mission met with Kubatbek Baibolov, who held the position of Prosecutor General of Kyrgyzstan at the time of Askarov's sentencing. According to him, the acting president at the time, Roza Otunbayeva, gave the court a direct instruction to sentence Askarov to life imprisonment.

Kubatbek Baibolov, who served as Prosecutor General in 2010, confirmed that case against Askarov was politically motivated and directed by Otunbayeva. Members of Azimzhan Askarov's family also spoke about Roza Otunbaeva's guilt in their appeals to the UN. On March 31, 2016, the UN Human Rights Committee recognized that the state, during the investigation and trial of the criminal case against Azimzhan Askarov, violated Article 7, separately and in conjunction with Article 1 and Article 14, paragraph 3 (b) and (e) of the International Covenant on Civil and Political Rights. The Committee noted the use of torture, cruel, inhuman, degrading treatment.

=== Relationships with organized crime ===
Temirov Live journalists were able to discover photographs of the participation of closest sister of Roza Otunbaeva at a family event together with the largest criminal authority in Central Asia, Kamchy Kolbayev, who was under US sanctions and killed in 2023 in a special operation of the Kyrgyz government.

== Repression of opposition leaders ==
=== Case of Urmat Baryktabasov ===
Under Roza Otunbaeva, a mass arrest of supporters of Urmat Baryktabasov was carried out. Opposition leader Baryktabasov, leader of the Meken-Tuu (My Motherland) party, tried to reach Bishkek on August 5, 2010, together with his supporters. On the way to the capital, the column of oppositionists was dispersed by police who used special equipment. Baryktabasov and a number of his supporters were arrested.

"Many of them have nothing to do with Baryktabasov or the organization of rallies," the human rights activist explained. NGO leaders noted that among those detained were representatives of the youth wing of Zhasasyn of Kyrgyzstan! party. ("Live, Kyrgyzstan!"), the Zhashtar Kenesh ("Youth Parliament") movement and others. According to Umetalieva, she witnessed how beaten people were taken out of the State National Security Service in ambulances. According to doctors, the detainees were subjected to torture. Umetalieva noted that "if government members continue repression, the situation may get out of control." Urmat Baryktabasov was sentenced to 4 years in prison and denied all charges.

=== Persecution of party members ===
After the success of the Ata-Jurt party in the 2010 parliamentary elections in Kyrgyzstan, on October 23, the house of its leader, Kamchybek Tashiev, was robbed. He later told Al Jazeera that "they burst in like bandits... I think they intended to shoot me. I believe that they tried to destroy me - forces that want to overturn the election results and impose a state of emergency. I know that, of course, the State Committee for National Security [security services] was behind these actions." He accused Keneshbek Duyshebaev, head of the State Committee for National Security in the office of transitional President Roza Otunbaeva, of attacking him. During the 2010 elections, his party office was also looted and burned.

== Post-Presidency ==
In January 2012, Otunbayeva established the International Public Foundation "Roza Otunbayeva Initiative". The main objective of the Foundation is to implement programs and projects that will contribute to the social, political and economic development of the Kyrgyz Republic. During a 2016 speech by her successor at a military parade on Ala-Too Square for the 25th anniversary of Kyrgyzstan's independence, Otunbayeva walked off the stage after President Almazbek Atambayev repeatedly criticized her government.

During a speech at the Middlebury Institute of International Studies in May 2018, she claimed that the young Kyrgyz generation values freedom above all, saying that they "have been infected by freedom and it runs deep".

== Honours and awards ==
Roza Otunbayeva was listed as one of the 150 Most Influential Women in the World by Newsweek/Daily Beast 2011 Edition.

Otunbayeva has received France's "Legion of Honour" Award with the degree of Commander, as well as the highest order of Mongolia's "Polar Star" Award. She was awarded the Premio Minerva Medallion, which is presided over by the President of the Italian Republic, "For occupying the highest institutional role in Kyrgyzstan, and for her international activities promoting democracy and peace".

In 2011, Otunbayeva received an International Women of Courage Award, which is presented annually by the United States Department of State to women around the world who have shown leadership, courage, resourcefulness, and the willingness to sacrifice for others, especially while promoting women's rights. On December 13, 2012, the Eurasia Foundation (USA) awarded her with the 2012 Bill Maynes Award for demonstrating visionary leadership throughout Kyrgyzstan's constitutional transition and providing a lifelong example of public service.

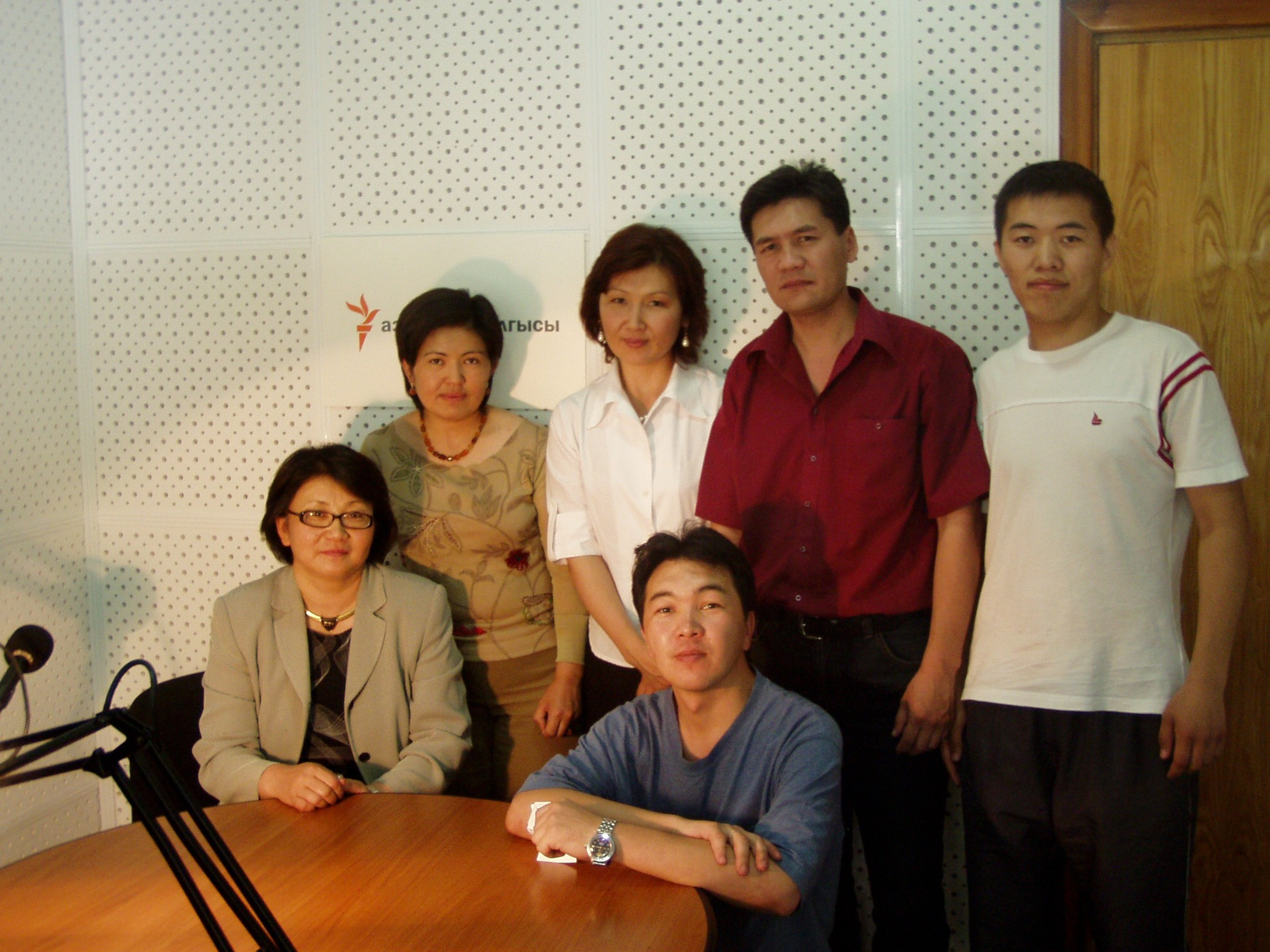
Roza Otunbayeva (left, seated), then-Foreign Minister, at the Azattyk Media studio in Bishkek, with journalists Cholpon Orozobekova, Aziza Turdueva, Kubat Otorbaev, Kanat Subakojoev, and studio manager Maksat Toroev (seated).

Otunbayeva is a member of:

- Club de Madrid (Madrid)
- Governing Board of the Interstate Foundation of Humanitarian Cooperation of the Commonwealth of Independent States (CIS) (Moscow)
- Leadership Council of the Sustainable Development Solutions Network, a Global Initiative of the United Nations (New York)
- Board of the UN University for Peace (UPEACE) in Costa Rica
- Board of the UNESCO Mahatma Gandhi Institute of Education for Peace and Sustainable Development (New Delhi)
- IOM Migration Advisory Board (Geneva)

She is an Honorary Professor at the:

- Shanghai University of Political Science and Law (China)
- Honorary Professor at the Ganjavi University (Azerbaijan)

She is also an Honorary Professor at:

- I. Razzakov Kyrgyz State Technical University
- B. Beishenalieva Kyrgyz State Arts and Culture University
- K. Tynystanov Issyk-Kul State University
- J. Balasagyn Kyrgyz National University
- K. Moldobasanova Kyrgyz National Conservatory
- MVD Academy of Kyrgyzstan
- Jalal-Abad State University
- K. Karasaev Bishkek Humanities University
- S. Naamatov Naryn State University

== See also ==
- 2010 Kyrgyzstani uprising
- List of elected and appointed female heads of state

== Notes ==
Political offices
| Preceded by Muratbek Imanaliyev | Minister of Foreign Affairs; 1992 | Succeeded by Ednan Karabayev |
| Preceded by Kurmanbek Bakiyev | President of Kyrgyzstan; 2010–2011 | Succeeded by Almazbek Atambayev |
