= Ednan Karabayev =

Kyrgyzstani politician

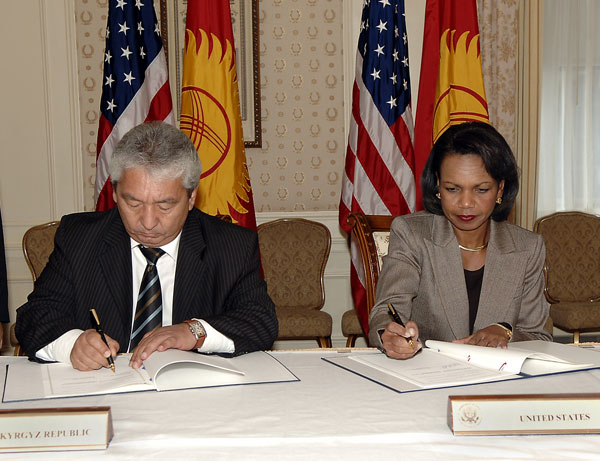
Ednan Karabayev with Condoleezza Rice (2007)

Ednan Oskonovich Karabayev (born 17 January 1953 in Talas, Kyrgyz SSR) was the foreign minister of Kyrgyzstan from 1992 to 1993, and from February 2007 to January 2009.
