= List of years in Kyrgyzstan =

This is a timeline of History of Kyrgyzstan. Each article deals with events in Kyrgyzstan in a given year.

== Twentieth century ==
1990s
1990
1991
1992
1993
1994
1995
1996
1997
1998
1999

1980s
1980
1981
1982
1983
1984
1985
1986
1987
1988
1989

1970s
1970
1971
1972
1973
1974
1975
1976
1977
1978
1979

1960s
1960
1961
1962
1963
1964
1965
1966
1967
1968
1969

== Twenty-first century ==
2020s
2020
2021
2022
2023
2024
2025
2026
2027
2028
2029

2010s
2010
2011
2012
2013
2014
2015
2016
2017
2018
2019

2000s
2000
2001
2002
2003
2004
2005
2006
2007
2008
2009
