= 2026 in Kyrgyzstan =

- Decades: 2000s; 2010s; 2020s
- See also: Other events of 2026; Timeline of Kyrgyz history

This is a list of individuals and events related to Kyrgyzstan in 2026.

== Incumbents ==
Photo	Post	Name
	President of Kyrgyzstan	Sadyr Japarov
	Prime Minister of Kyrgyzstan	Adylbek Kasymaliev

== Events ==
- 16 February – President Japarov dismisses his ministers for transportation, environment and emergency situations.
- 8 March – Two people are killed and 19 people are injured following a mining incident in Samarkandek, Batken Region.
- 27 March – President Japarov announces that the country has started printing out their national currency.
- 3 April – The Kyrgyz Ministry of Emergency Situations says that Kyrgyzstan has dispatched over 100 tons of humanitarian aid to Iran. The shipment is ordered by President Japarov.
- 12 May – Former security chief Kamchybek Tashiev and seven others are arrested on charges of planning a coup.
- 3 June – Kyrgyzstan is elected to a rotating seat at the United Nations Security Council.
- 4 August – President Japarov signs a law banning the use of cremation for deceased human bodies.

== Holidays ==
- 1 January – New Year's Day
- 7 January – Christmas
- 23 February – Defender of the Fatherland Day
- 8-9 March – International Women's Day
- 20 March – Orozo Ait
- 21 March – Nooruz Mairamy
- 7 April – Day of the People's April Revolution
- 1 May – International Workers' Day
- 5 May – Constitution Day
- 9-11 May – Great Patriotic War Against Fascism Victory Day
- 27 May – Kurman Ait
- 31 August – Independence Day
- 7–10 November – Days of History and Commemoration of Ancestors

== Deaths ==
- 1 January – Marat Amankulov, 55, MP (2015–2021).
- 8 June –
  - Myktybek Abdyldayev, 72, speaker of the Supreme Council (2020) and MP (since 2010).
  - Turgun Mashrapova, 98, member of the Supreme Soviet of the Soviet Union (1974–1979).
- 18 November – Eldos Almazov, 29, stand-up comedian, video blogger and streamer.

== See also ==
- Outline of Kyrgyzstan
- List of Kyrgyzstan-related topics
- History of Kyrgyzstan
