= 2027 in Kyrgyzstan =

- Decades: 2000s; 2010s; 2020s
- See also: Other events of 2027; Timeline of Kyrgyz history

This is a list of individuals and events related to Kyrgyzstan in 2027.

== Events ==
=== Predicted and scheduled ===
- 24 January – 2027 Kyrgyz presidential election

== Holidays ==
- 1 January – New Year's Day
- 7 January – Christmas
- 23 February – Defender of the Fatherland Day
- 8-9 March – International Women's Day
- 20 March – Orozo Ait
- 21 March – Nooruz Mairamy
- 7 April – Day of the People's April Revolution
- 1 May – International Workers' Day
- 5 May – Constitution Day
- 9-10 May – Great Patriotic War Against Fascism Victory Day
- 16 May – Kurman Ait
- 31 August – Independence Day
- 7–8 November – Days of History and Commemoration of Ancestors

== See also ==
- Outline of Kyrgyzstan
- List of Kyrgyzstan-related topics
- History of Kyrgyzstan
