= Public holidays in Kyrgyzstan =

This is the list of public holidays in Kyrgyzstan:

Date	English name	Local name/s	Notes
January 1	New Year's Day	Жаңы жыл (Jangy jyl); Новый Год (Novyy God)	
January 7	Orthodox Christmas	Төрөлүү майрамы (Törölüü mayramy); Рождество Христово (Rojdestvo hrıstovo / Rozhdestvo Khristovo)	Celebrated by local Orthodox Christians
February 23	Fatherland Defenders' Day	Мекенди коргоочунун күнү (Mekendi korgoochunun künü); День защитника Отечества (Den' zashchitnika Otechestva)	Formation of the Red Army in February 1918.
March 8	International Women's Day	Эл аралык аялдар күнү (El aralyk ayaldar künü); Международный женский день (Mezhdunarodnyy zhenskiy den')	
March 21	Nowruz	Нооруз	Which is originally the Persian New Year, is traditionally a springtime holiday marking the beginning of a new year.
April 7	Day of the People's April Revolution	Элдик Апрель революциясы күнү (Eldik Aprelʼ revolyutsiyasy künü)	Commemorates the Second Kyrgyz Revolution of 2010.
May 1	International Workers' Day	Эмгек күнү (Emgek künü)	
May 5	Constitution Day	Кыргыз Республикасынын конституция күнү (Kyrgyz Respublikasynyn konstitutsiya künü); День Конституции Кыргызская Республики (Den' Konstitutsii Kyrgyzskaya Respubliki)	
May 9	Great Patriotic War Against Fascism Victory Day	Жеңиш күнү (Jengish künü); День Победы (Den' Pobedy)	A holiday in the former Soviet Union carried over to present-day Kazakhstan and other former republics (Except Baltic Countries and Ukraine).
August 31	Independence Day	Кыргыз Республикасынын Эгемендүүлүк күнү (Kyrgyz Respublikasynyn Egemendüülük künü); День независимости Кыргызская Республики (Den' nezavisimosti Kyrgyzskaya Respubliki)	
November 7–8	Days of History and Commemoration of Ancestors	Тарых күн жана аталардын эскерүү (Tarykh kün jana atalardyn eskerüü)	Two-day holiday commemorating the national liberation uprising and the tragic events of 1916 known as Urkun. Previously, from independence to 2017, the country celebrated the Great October Socialist Revolution. It has now been replaced with День примирения и согласия ("Day of Reconciliation and Agreement"), celebrated on a Nov. 7 (at least officially) before amendments in Labour Codex (adopted in December 2004, new holiday, which celebrates at November 4 is the People Unity Day ("День народного единства)"
Shawwal 1	Orozo Ait	Орозо айт	End of Ramadan
Dhu'l-Hijja 10	Kurman Ait	Курман айт	Feast of Sacrifice

Two additional Muslim holidays Orozo Ait and Kurman Ait are defined by lunar calendar.

== Other holidays ==
- Day of the Armed Forces - 29 May
- Day of Aviation - August 18
