= 2022 in Kyrgyzstan =

- Decades: 2000s; 2010s; 2020s
- See also: Other events of 2022; Timeline of Kyrgyz history

This is a list of individuals and events related to Kyrgyzstan in 2022.

== Incumbents ==
| Photo | Post | Name |
|---|---|---|
| | President of Kyrgyzstan | Sadyr Japarov |
| | Prime Minister of Kyrgyzstan | Akylbek Japarov |

== Events ==
=== January - March ===
- 9 January – Health Minister Alymkadyr Beishenaliev announces that 55% of the Kyrgyzstan population has received their first doses of the COVID-19 vaccine.
- 25 January – Millions of people are left without electricity after a major power outage affects Kazakhstan, Kyrgyzstan and Uzbekistan. Uzbekistan's energy ministry reports that the power outage had been triggered by an "energy imbalance" in Kazakhstan's power grid.
- 27 January – Two civilians are killed while 21 more people are wounded near the border between Kyrgyzstan and Tajikistan after troops from both countries engage in a battle.
- 24 February – President Sadyr Japarov signs a decree that bans the slaughtering of cattle during funerals in the country.
- 25 February – The Kyrgyzstan Health Ministry announces that the country plans to purchase doses of the Johnson & Johnson COVID-19 vaccine, as well as around 100,800 doses of the Moderna COVID-19 vaccine.
- 4 March – A Turkish citizen wanted for the assassination of journalist Hrant Dink is detained in Bishkek, Kyrgyzstan.
- 5 March – Kyrgyzstan Foreign Minister Ruslan Kazakbayev expresses his support for any efforts to mediate a ceasefire between Russia and Ukraine.
- 10 March – An armed incident occurs between border guards at the Kyrgyzstan–Tajikistan border, killing one Tajik border guard. Following the incident, officials from the Batken Region in Kyrgyzstan and the Sughd Region in Tajikistan hold talks.
- 18 March – President Sadyr Japarov signs a law to rename the town of Isfana as Razzaqov in honor of former Secretary of the Communist Party of Kirghizia Iskhak Razzakov. The law was passed by the Kyrgyzstan Parliament on March 16.
- 20 March – A mine collapse in Özgön near the Osh Region kills three people.

=== May - July ===
- 4 April – Centerra Gold announces that they have reached an agreement with Kyrgyzstan to hand control of the Kumtor Gold Mine to the Kyrgyz government.
- 7 April – Kazakhstan will lift their COVID-19 travel restrictions at the country's borders with Kyrgyzstan, Russia and Uzbekistan.
- 23 May – A mudflow hits the village of Ak-Suu, Aksy District, cutting off access to the village and trapping three cars.
- 4 June – Tajikistan says that a border clash happened yesterday after Kyrgyz soldiers crossed the border close to Vorukh.
- 14 June – A Tajik border guard is killed and three others are injured in a clash with Kyrgyzstan border troops.

=== August - October ===
- 14 September – Two Tajik border guards are killed and two others are injured during clashes with Kyrgyz guards, who accuse Tajikistan of taking positions at a demarcated area.
- 16 September – According to Kyrgyzstan, Tajik forces again open fire on its outposts and clashes occur along the border with Tajik forces using armored vehicles and mortars. Tajikistan accuses Kyrgyz forces of shelling one of its outposts and several villages.
- 18 September – The death toll from the fighting between Kyrgyzstan and Tajikistan, which began eight days ago, increases to 94. Fifty-nine of the people were killed in Kyrgyzstan, and the 35 others were killed in Tajikistan. Another 139 people are injured.

== Deaths ==
- 22 January – Emilbek Abakirov, 92, Kyrgyz politician
- 25 January – Mark Tseitlin, 78, chess grandmaster
- 3 February – Chorobek Baigazakov, 75, politician, deputy (1990–1995)
- 12 February – Moldomusa Kongantiyev, 63, politician, minister of the interior (2008–2010)

== See also ==
- Outline of Kyrgyzstan
- List of Kyrgyzstan-related topics
- History of Kyrgyzstan
