= 2018 in Kyrgyzstan =

- Decades: 1990s; 2000s; 2010s; 2020s
- See also: Other events of 2018; Timeline of Kyrgyz history

Events in the year 2018 in Kyrgyzstan.

== Incumbents ==
- President – Sooronbay Jeenbekov
- Prime Minister – Sapar Isakov (until 19 April), Mukhammedkalyi Abylgaziev (from 20 April)

== Events ==
- February 9–25: Kyrgyzstan took part in the 2018 Winter Olympics in PyeongChang, South Korea.
- April 19: Prime Minister Sapar Isakov is ousted as Prime Minister of Kyrgyzstan from a parliamentary vote of no confidence.

== Deaths ==
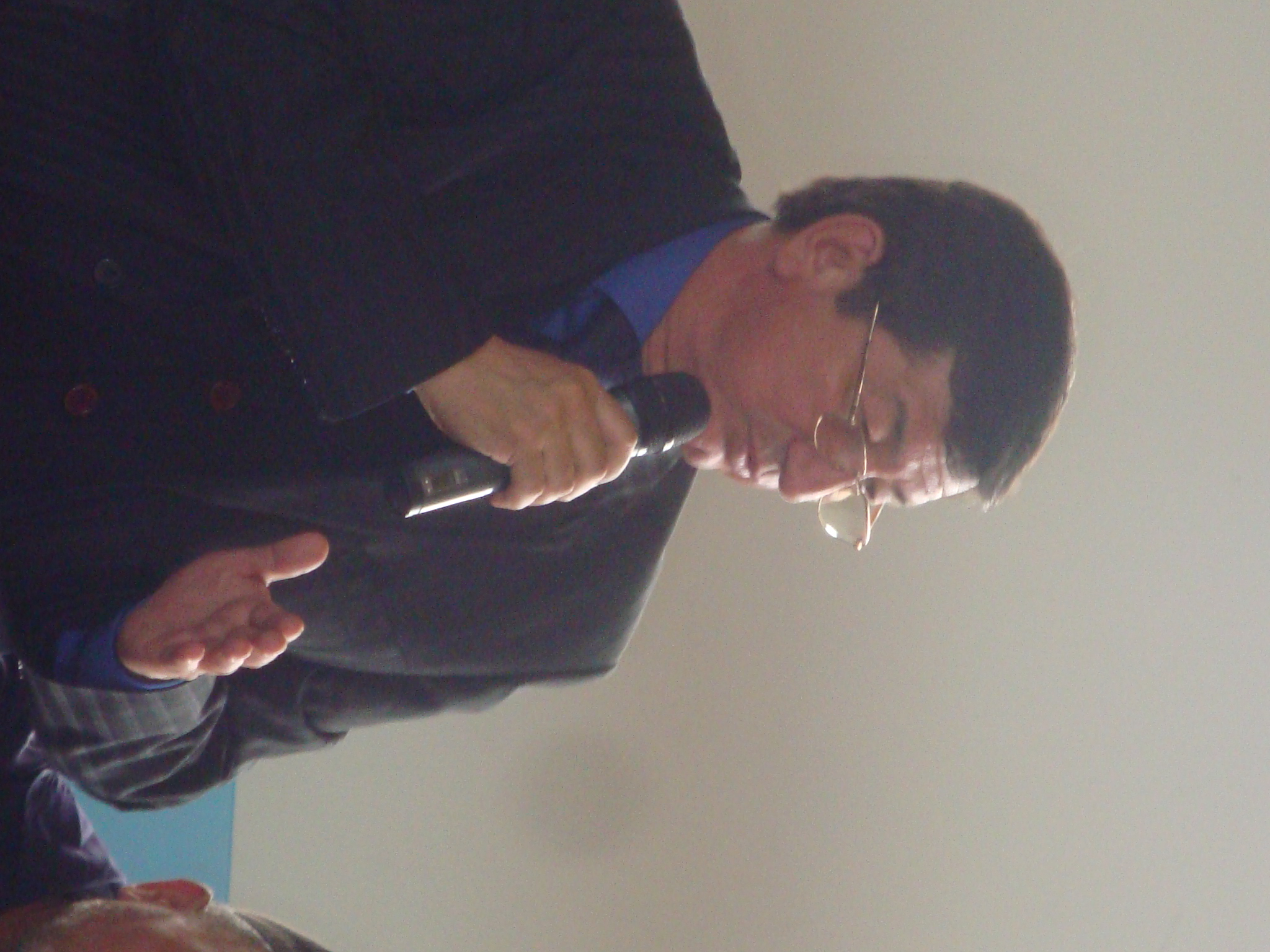
Kadyrzhan Batyrov

- 2 January – Jyrgalbek Kalmamatov, politician (b. 1972).
- 4 December – Kadyrzhan Batyrov, businessman and politician (b. 1956).
