= Border Guards Day =

Holiday in former Soviet Union

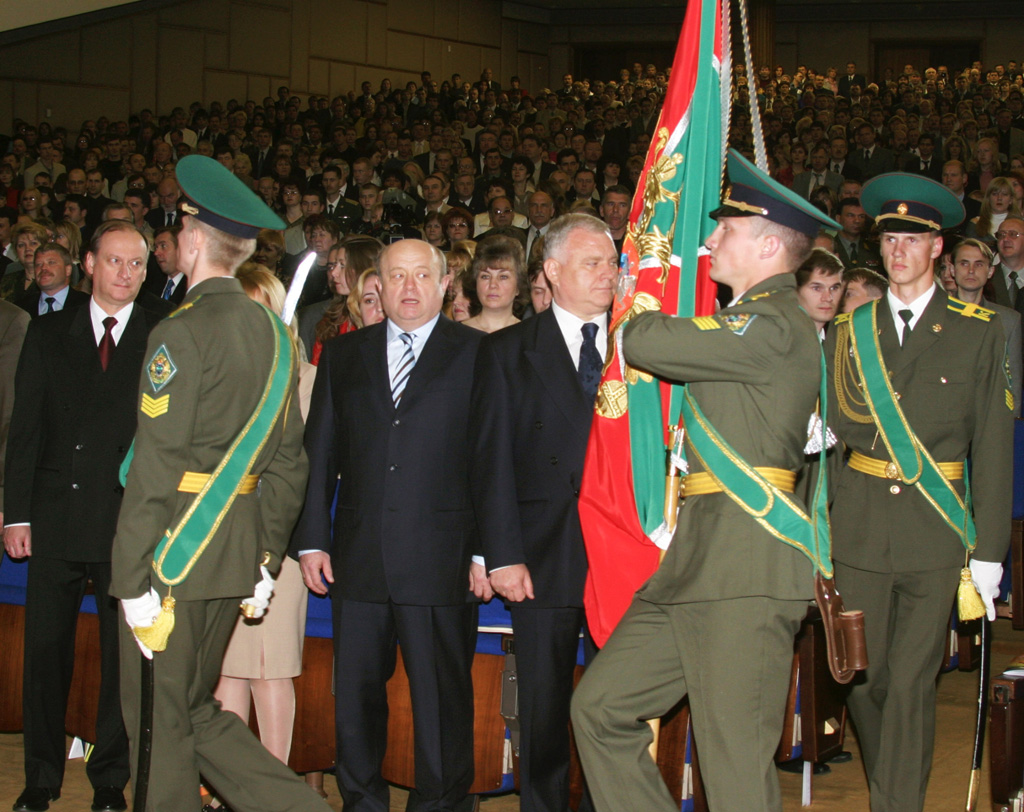
- Russian Prime Minister Mikhail Fradkov (center) attending a gala concert in the State Kremlin Palace to mark Border Guards Day, 28 May 2004.
- Official name: Day of the Border Troops
- Observed by: Russia; Belarus; Ukraine (Formerly); Kyrgyzstan; Kazakhstan; Moldova; Tajikistan
- Significance: Celebrates the border guards of the armed forces of former Soviet countries
- Observances: Wreath laying ceremonies, concerts, parades
- Date: 28 May
- Next time: 28 May 2027
- Frequency: annual

Border Guards Day (Russian: День пограничника; Kazakh: Шекараны қорғау күні, romanized: Şekarany qorğau künı; Tajik: Рӯзи сарҳадбонони сарҳадӣ; Kyrgyz: Чек ара кызматы күнү; Belarusian: дзень пагранічніка, romanized: dzień pahraničnika; Romanian: Ziua de Grăniceri), also known as Frontier Guards Day, is a former Soviet holiday that celebrates the border guard services of Russia and former Soviet republics. It is currently observed in Russia, Belarus, Kyrgyzstan, and Tajikistan on 28 May - the anniversary of the formation of the Soviet Border Troops in 1918.

== Background ==
The first Border Guards Day celebrations were marked on May 28, 1919, the first anniversary since the Border Troops were created as a directly reporting agency under the Cheka of Felix Dzerzhinsky, which was one of the pioneer border protection forces in the modern world (together with the Polish Straż Graniczna and the Italian Guardia di Finanza, among others), in the midst of the Russian Civil War, the first celebrations were owing to the duties of the border guards in the conflict.

== Celebrations in the Russian Federation ==
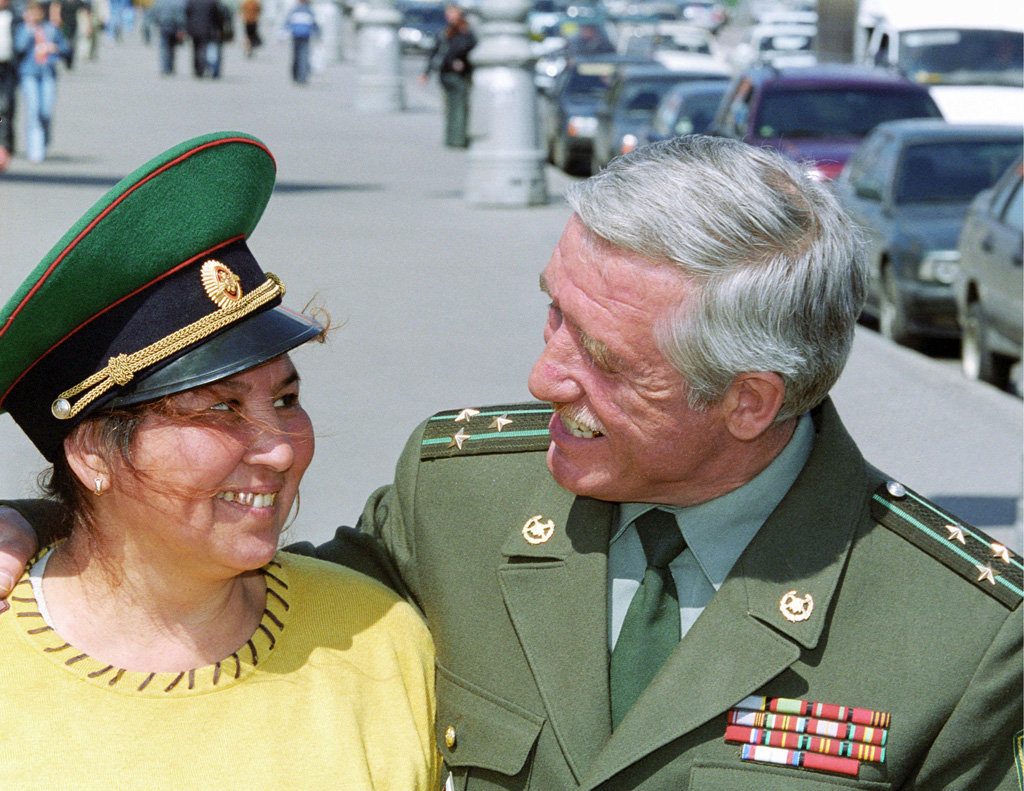
A border guard veteran and his wife embrace during the celebrations in 2004.

The holiday was established as a professional holiday in 1958, by order of the Council of Ministers of the USSR. Following the fall of the Soviet Union, the status of the holiday was unclear due to the lack effort in the Russian government to make it an official holiday in the Russian Federation. President Boris Yeltsin signed a decree in 1994 officially making Border Guards Day a professional day off for the servicemen of the Border Service of the Federal Security Service of the Russian Federation, which was founded 2 years earlier. Today, it is a celebration of more than 4 centuries of border protection and control in Russia, dating back to Prince Mikhail Ivanovich Vorotynsky's Zasechnaya cherta in the 16th century, an early prototype to the border checkpoints in operation today nationwide.

== Celebrations around the world ==
Although Border Guards Day is mainly celebrated in Russia, a number of former republics in the former USSR, have preserved and continue to celebrate this holiday on May 28. A number of other countries still celebrate the holiday on different dates.

=== Abkhazia ===
Abkhazia has recognized 28 May as Border Guards Day since its independence in 1991 and celebrates the holiday similarly to Russia.

=== Armenia ===
Armenia has recognized 26 April as Border Guards Day since 2007.

=== Azerbaijan ===
In Azerbaijan, the Day of the Border Guard is celebrated on August 18, in order to honor the parliamentary decree signed on August 18, 1919, which outlined the borders of Azerbaijan and its protection. In 2000, Heydar Aliyev announced that August 18 was set to be the new holiday of the State Border Service.

=== Baltics ===
The Baltic republics of Estonia, Latvia, Lithuania do not recognize May 28 as a holiday due to the Soviet occupation of the Baltic states. The Baltic border agencies of the three countries celebrate their own professional holidays on different days.

==== Latvia ====
The Day of the State Border Guard of Latvia has been celebrated on November 7 since 2015, marking the founding of the force in 1919.

==== Lithuania ====
The Day of the State Border Guard of Lithuania is celebrated on June 29.

=== Belarus ===
Belarus has recognized 28 May as Border Guards Day since its independence in 1991 and celebrates the holiday similarly to Russia. The border troops of both Belarus and Russia commonly hold joint parades during the holiday.

=== Kazakhstan ===
In Kazakhstan, the Day of the Border Guard is celebrated on August 18. It became a professional holiday in 1992, and was included to the calendar of professional holidays in 2002.

=== Kyrgyzstan ===
Kyrgyzstan has recognized 28 May as Border Guards Day since its independence in 1991 and celebrates the holiday similarly to Russia. The date of the holiday was shifted to October 29 in 2003 by order of President Akayev, but was changed back to its original date 2 years later due to appeals veterans of the Soviet Border Troops and the Kyrgyz Frontier Force.

=== Moldova ===
June 10 celebrates the founding of the Moldovan Border Police in 1995.

=== South Ossetia ===
South Ossetia has recognized 28 May as Border Guards Day since its independence in 1991 and celebrates the holiday similarly to Russia.

=== Tajikistan ===
Tajikistan has recognized 28 May as Border Guards Day since its independence in 1991 and celebrates the holiday similarly to Russia. 2014 celebrated the 20th anniversary since the establishment of the Tajik Border Troops. In honor of this anniversary, a military parade in central Dushanbe was held, with the commander of the Border Troops, Lieutenant General Rajabali Rahmonali and Commander of the Dushanbe Military Garrison, Major General Bakhtiyor Ruzmonshoev inspecting the more than 1,000 troops who participated in the parade.

=== Turkmenistan ===
Border Guards Day is celebrated on August 11 in Turkmenistan, honoring the founding of the State Border Service of Turkmenistan.

=== Ukraine ===
In Ukraine, Border Guards Day (Ukrainian: День прикордонника) has been celebrated on April 30 as an official holiday since 2018. After Ukraine gained its independence, the date of celebration was moved to November 4 by decree of President of Ukraine, Leonid Kravchuk. The new date however, did not take root, with border guards who served during the Soviet era recognizing May 28 as Border Guards Day. The holiday was moved back to its original in 2003, but was changed in 2018 to April 30 by order of President Petro Poroshenko as a result of his de-Russification policy following the Russian annexation of Crimea in 2014. The date commemorates the day during the Ukrainian War of Independence on which Ukrainian troops established the border of the Ukrainian State in the settlement of Kovpaky on April 30, 1918.

== See also ==
- Armed Forces Day
- Navy Day
- Defender of the Fatherland Day
- Paratroopers' Day
- Defender of the Fatherland Day (Kazakhstan)
- Day of the Armed Forces (Kyrgyzstan)
- Defender of the Motherland Day
- Armed Forces Day (Tajikistan)
