= 2021 in Kyrgyzstan =

- Decades: 2000s; 2010s; 2020s
- See also: Other events of 2021; Timeline of Kyrgyz history

This is a list of individuals and events related to Kyrgyzstan in 2021.

== Incumbents ==
Photo	Post	Name
	President of Kyrgyzstan (acting)	Talant Mamytov (until 28 January)
	President of Kyrgyzstan	Sadyr Japarov (starting 28 January)
	Prime Minister of Kyrgyzstan (acting)	Artem Novikov (until 3 February)
	Prime Minister of Kyrgyzstan	Ulukbek Maripov (starting 3 February)

== Events ==
=== March to April ===
- 28 April - Exchanges of gunfire between Kyrgyz and Tajik forces, near the Golovnoi water intake facility, reportedly injured 17 people and lead to the Kyrgyz government evacuating three villages in the southern Batken region.
- 29 April
  - Kyrgyz prime minister Ulukbek Maripov established an anti-crisis centre to monitor the situation in Bakten following clashes in the region.
  - Kyrgyzstan and Tajikistan agrees for a ceasefire on the conflict in Bakten.
  - Kyrgyzstan's National Security Committee claimed that Tajik troops fired mortar shells at a water reservoir in Kök-Tash, Batken Region, reportedly leading to one death.

=== May to June ===
- 15 May - State Committee for National Security searched the office of Kumtor Gold Company, the largest western-operated gold mine in Central Asia.
- 31 May - Former speaker of Kyrgyz Parliament Asylbek Jeenbekov and deputy Torobai Zupulkarov were detained for Kumtor corruption case.
- 2 June - Pervomaisky District Court of Bishkek sentenced former Kyrgyz prime minister Omurbek Babanov for two months in pre-trial detention. Former deputy of Kyrgyz parliament Iskhak Pirmatov and Talant Uzakbaev were also placed on detention for two months.

=== July to August ===
- 3 August - Former Kyrgyz prime minister Temir Sariev was arrested by the State Committee for National Security following corruption charges on Kumtor Gold Mine case.

=== October ===
- 13 October - Sadyr Japarov's third government is formed.

=== November ===
- 26 November - Security services in Kyrgyzstan said Friday they had detained 15 “active members” of a coup plot involving lawmakers and former officials ahead of a parliamentary vote at the weekend. The detained were part of a plan to get “1,000 aggressive young people” to protest the results of the vote, the state committee for national security said in a statement. “After the announcement of the results of the upcoming parliamentary elections...this group planned to organise mass protests in (the capital) Bishkek and subsequently to aggravate the situation, provoking clashes with the forces of law and order and further violent seizure of power,” the statement said. Security services “obtained irrefutable evidence of the criminal activity of a group of persons under the leadership of certain destructive political forces, including deputies of the (parliament) and former high-ranking officials.” Without naming the detained, the committee also said it had “found and seized firearms, ammunition and drugs” in a raid on the alleged group’s office.

== See also ==
- Outline of Kyrgyzstan
- List of Kyrgyzstan-related topics
- History of Kyrgyzstan
