= 2025 in Kyrgyzstan =

- Decades: 2000s; 2010s; 2020s
- See also: Other events of 2025; Timeline of Kyrgyz history

This is a list of individuals and events related to Kyrgyzstan in 2025.

== Incumbents ==
Photo	Post	Name
	President of Kyrgyzstan	Sadyr Japarov
	Prime Minister of Kyrgyzstan	Adylbek Kasymaliev

== Events ==
=== February ===
- 21 February – Kyrgyzstan and Tajikistan announce an agreement to delineate their common border.

=== March ===
- 31 March – Kyrgyzstan, Tajikistan and Uzbekistan sign an agreement fixing their common border's tripoint.

=== May ===
- 2 May – The Cabinet of Ministers submits a draft bill to close all rural libraries across the country.

=== June ===
- 3 June – Former president Almazbek Atambayev is sentenced in absentia to 11 years imprisonment for illicit enrichment, illegally acquiring land, and involvement in the 2019 Kyrgyz protests.
- 7 June – A statue of Vladimir Lenin believed to be the tallest of its kind in Central Asia is dismantled in Osh.

=== July ===
- 10 July – Six officials are arrested during a government meeting in Osh as part of a State Committee for National Security (GKNB) anti-corruption crackdown.
- 11 July – Flooding in Osh damages newly renovated streets and a municipal market after heavy rains overwhelm clogged drainage systems.

=== August ===
- 15 August – An Italian climber dies on Jengish Chokusu while trying to rescue a Russian companion who sustained a medical emergency and remains missing.
- 28 August – Kyrgyzstan begins building the Barskoon-Bedel highway to China’s Xinjiang, including tunnels under the Soek and Ashuu-Suu passes. The completion is expected to be in 2030.

=== September ===
- 25 September – The Supreme Council votes to dissolve itself, triggering a snap election.

=== November ===
- 20 November – The CEO of the Chinese gold mining firm Kemin Resource Group is arrested on charges relating to environmental damage caused by one of its mines.
- 30 November – 2025 Kyrgyz parliamentary election.

=== December ===
- 17 December – The new Supreme Council convenes for the first time following the 2025 Kyrgyz parliamentary election.

== Deaths ==
- 23 August – Ruslan Kurmanaliev, 53, actor.

== Holidays ==
- 1 January – New Year's Day
- 7 January – Christmas
- 23 February – Defender of the Fatherland Day
- 8 March – International Women's Day
- 21 March – Nooruz Mairamy
- 30 March – Orozo Ait
- 7 April – Day of the People's April Revolution
- 1 May – International Workers' Day
- 5 May – Constitution Day
- 9 May – Great Patriotic War Against Fascism Victory Day
- 6 June – Kurman Ait
- 31 August – Independence Day
- 7–10 November – Days of History and Commemoration of Ancestors

== See also ==
- Outline of Kyrgyzstan
- List of Kyrgyzstan-related topics
- History of Kyrgyzstan
