= 2010 in Kyrgyzstan =

- Decades: 1990s; 2000s; 2010s; 2020s
- See also: Other events of 2010; Timeline of Kyrgyz history

The following lists events that happened during 2010 in Kyrgyzstan.

== Incumbents ==
- President: Kurmanbek Bakiyev (until 15 April), Roza Otunbayeva (from 15 April)
- Prime Minister: Daniar Usenov (until 7 April), Vacant (7 April–17 December), Almazbek Atambayev (from 17 December)

== Events ==
=== April ===
- April 6 - Hundreds of protesters seize a government office in Bishkek to request the resignation of Kurmanbek Bakiyev after battling flashbangs and lachrymators. A local governor is taken hostage by protesters. Hundreds surround police HQ. Almazbek Atambayev is seized by police. There are riots in Talas.
- April 7 - Kyrgyz Revolution of 2010
  - President Kurmanbek Bakiyev reportedly flees the country, as the government steps down and protestors overrun the parliament building. The opposition announces the formation of a new provisional government headed by Roza Otunbayeva.
  - President Kurmanbek Bakiyev makes a last-ditch attempt to quell the riots by imposing a curfew as six people reportedly die.
  - Protesters seize the state television channel building in the capital, Bishkek. Kyrgyz opposition representatives and human rights activists appear on the TV channel KTR which resumes broadcasting after one hour.
  - Interior Minister Moldomusa Kongantiyev is reported to have been killed after being taken hostage by opposition protesters inside an interior department building in the northern city of Talas.
- April 8 - Kyrgyz Revolution of 2010
  - 100 people die in anti-government protests in Kyrgyzstan, according to opposition activist Toktoim Umetalieva.
  - The Kyrgyzstan government is ousted as the result of the popular revolt.
  - Opposition leader Roza Otunbayeva says she will lead a temporary government for six months.
  - President Kurmanbek Bakiyev escapes Bishkek, purportedly to a southern region of the country through Osh. He refuses to resign, but admits he has lost control of the Kyrgyz military.
