= 2020 in Kyrgyzstan =

- Decades: 2000s; 2010s; 2020s
- See also: Other events of 2020; Timeline of Kyrgyz history

Events in the year 2020 in Kyrgyzstan.

== Incumbents ==
- President – Sooronbay Jeenbekov (until 15 October); Sadyr Japarov (15 October-14 November); Talant Mamytov (starting 14 November)
- Prime Minister – Mukhammedkalyi Abylgaziev (until 15 June); Kubatbek Boronov (17 June-9 October); Sadyr Japarov (10 October-14 November); Artem Novikov (starting 14 November)

== Events ==
Ongoing – COVID-19 pandemic in Kyrgyzstan

=== March ===
- 18 March – The first three cases of COVID-19 in the country were confirmed, after a citizen returned from Saudi Arabia according to the nation's health ministry.

=== June ===
- 15 June – Prime Minister Abylgaziev resigned from his post as Prime Minister in connection with allegations against the government in a criminal case on the extension and renewal of radio frequency resources.
- 17 June – The Supreme Council of Kyrgyzstan confirms former first deputy prime minister Kubatbek Boronov as the new prime minister.
- 23 June – Judge Emilbek Kaipov of the Birinchi Mai District Court sentenced former President Almazbek Atambayev to 11 years and two months in prison on corruption charges. Former Prosecutor-General Indira Joldubaeva, former chief of the Hematology Center Abdukhalim Raimjanov, and Kalybek Kachkynaliev, a former adviser to the State Penitentiary Service chief, were also found guilty.

=== July ===
- 17 July – The country announces the addition of thousands of cases and hundreds of deaths to its COVID-19 tallies, describing the corresponding pneumonia-related cases, which had not been confirmed by tests, as most likely linked to the SARS-CoV-2 virus.

=== September ===
- 2 September – The number of COVID-19 cases in the country reaches past 44,000.
- 11 September – The number of recoveries of COVID-19 in the country reaches past 40,000.

=== October ===
- From 5 October – 2020 Kyrgyzstani protests
- 9 October – Prime Minister Kubatbek Boronov resigns.
- 15 October – President Sooronbay Jeenbekov resigns.

== See also ==
- 2020 in Kyrgyzstan
- 2020 in Kyrgyzstani sport
