= Day of the Armed Forces (Kyrgyzstan) =

National holiday in Kyrgyzstan

Day of the Armed Forces Куралдуу күчтөрүнүн күнү День Вооруженных сил
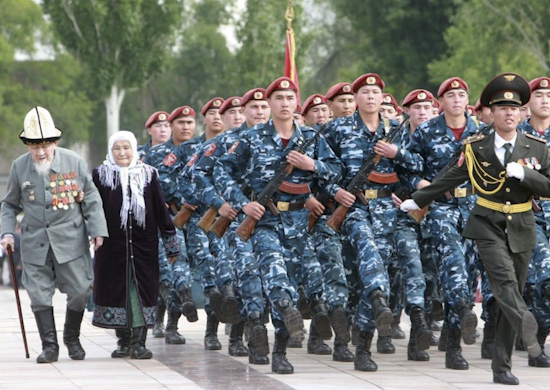
- A ceremony in honor of the Day of the Armed Forces in 2018.
- Official name: Куралдуу күчтөрүнүн күнү
- Observed by: Kyrgyzstan
- Celebrations: Military parades, ceremonies
- Date: May 29
- Next time: 29 May 2026
- Frequency: annual

Day of the Armed Forces is a national holiday in Kyrgyzstan celebrated annually on May 29 commemorating the founding of the Armed Forces of the Kyrgyz Republic. It the second military holiday celebrated in the country, with Defender of the Fatherland Day on 23 February being of equal status as of January 2003. Armed Forces Day also takes place a day after a different holiday, Border Guards Day, which commemorates jointly with Armed Forces Day.

== History and order of the holiday celebrations ==
On 29 May 1992, the Armed Forces were founded on the basis of the forces of the Soviet Army's Central Asian Military District based in the Kyrgyz SSR. The Day of the Armed Forces of Kyrgyzstan was established by the Decree of the Government on 19 May 1994 at the initiative of the Ministry of Defense.

The event is marked by military parades, fireworks and concerts throughout the country. In 2006, a military parade was held in the traditional style and order on Bishkek's Ala-Too Square, which was deemed "irresponsible" by opposition lawmaker Omurbek Tekebaev due to the fact that it coincided with opposition protests against President Kurmanbek Bakiyev. Defence Minister Ismail Isakov explained the timing as purely "coincidental".

Performance between the creative teams and bands of the National Guard, the State Border Service, and the Central Army House is commonplace. An exhibition of military equipment is also organized on the central square for the viewing of residents. In the evening, a festive fireworks display is conducted in the center of the capital.

== See also ==
- Public holidays in Kyrgyzstan
- Armed Forces Day
