= 2024 in Kyrgyzstan =

- Decades: 2000s; 2010s; 2020s
- See also: Other events of 2024; Timeline of Kyrgyz history

This is a list of individuals and events related to Kyrgyzstan in 2024.

== Incumbents ==
Photo	Post	Name
	President of Kyrgyzstan	Sadyr Japarov
	Prime Minister of Kyrgyzstan	Akylbek Japarov (until 16 December)
	Prime Minister of Kyrgyzstan	Adylbek Kasymaliev (starting 16 December)

== Events ==
=== May ===
- 26 March – Former deputy customs head Raimbek Matraimov is detained in Baku, Azerbaijan, and is extradited to Bishkek.
- 17 May – Violence breaks out in Bishkek after mobs attack foreign nationals.
- 22 May – The Kyrgyz Ministry of Internal Affairs announces that ten people, six Kyrgyz nationals and four foreigners, have been detained in connection with violent riots in Bishkek the previous week.
- 24 May – Hundreds of international students from Pakistan and other Asian countries leave Kyrgyzstan following attacks by Kyrgyz nationalist mobs on student hostels in Bishkek earlier this month.

=== June ===
- 14 June – Kyrgyzstan arrests 15 alleged Islamic State supporters.

=== July ===
- 24 July – Kyrgyzstan and Russia sign an agreement for the cleanup of 92 locations contaminated by more than 300 million cubic meters of toxic and radioactive waste brought about by mining during the Soviet era.
- 30 July – Kyrgyzstan says that 94% of its border with Tajikistan has been agreed upon by officials from both countries.

=== August ===
- 4 August – Scientists describe Alpkarakush kyrgyzicus, a new dinosaur taxon from Kyrgyzstan and the first theropod from the Jurassic period to be discovered in Central Asia.

=== December ===
- 16 December – President of Kyrgyzstan Sadyr Japarov announces that he has dismissed Akylbek Japarov as Prime Minister. Adylbek Kasymaliev replaces him.

== Holidays ==
- 1 January – New Year's Day
- 7 January – Christmas
- 23 February – Defender of the Fatherland Day
- 8 March – International Women's Day
- 21 March – Nooruz Mairamy
- 7 April – Day of the People's April Revolution
- 10 April – Orozo Ait
- 1 May – International Workers' Day
- 5 May – Constitution Day
- 9 May – Great Patriotic War Against Fascism Victory Day
- 16 June – Kurman Ait
- 31 August – Independence Day
- 7–8 November – Days of History and Commemoration of Ancestors

== Deaths ==
- 5 January – Arstanbek Abdyldayev, 55, political activist.

== See also ==
- Outline of Kyrgyzstan
- List of Kyrgyzstan-related topics
- History of Kyrgyzstan
