= Jyrgalbek Kalmamatov =

Kyrgyzstani politician

Jyrgalbek Kalmamatov (22 December 1972 – 2 January 2018) was a Kyrgyz politician and member of the Kyrgyzstan Party. He was born on December 22, 1972, in the village of Gulcho Osh Oblast. In 1993, he graduated from the Kyrgyz financial and economic school. He was elected to the Supreme Council in 2015, he died in office on 2 January 2018 of a heart attack at the age of 45. Kalmamatov had a wife and nine children.
