= Ruslan Kurmanaliev =

Kyrgyz actor (1972–2025)

Ruslan Kurmanaliev (Kyrgyz: Руслан Курманалиев; 25 February 1972 – 23 August 2025) was a Kyrgyz actor.

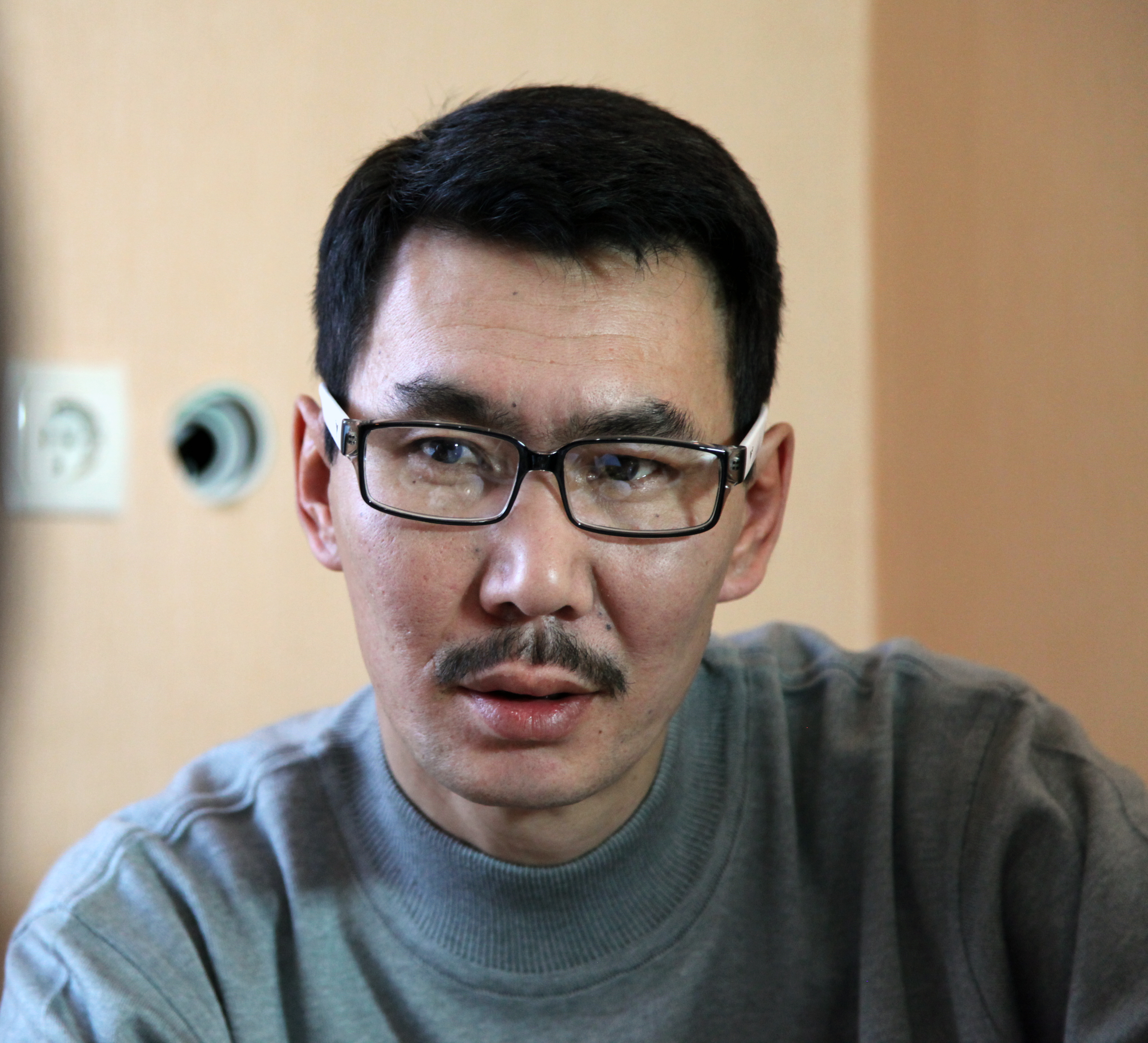
Ruslan Kurmanaliev

== Life and work ==
Kurmanaliev was born on 25 February 1972 in the Ak-Tala district, Naryn region. In 1993 he began to study at the theater school at the Kyrgyz State Academic Drama Theater, from which he graduated in 1996. In 1995 he was invited to work at the Tuguchu Theater. Since 2000 Ruslan had been an artist of the B. Kydykeeva Kyrgyz State Theater.

In 2018, he was credited in The Song of the Tree, a compilation feature film featuring short stories.

Kurmanaliev died on 23 August 2025, at the age of 53.
