= Kadyrzhan Batyrov =

Kyrgyz businessman and politician (1956–2018)

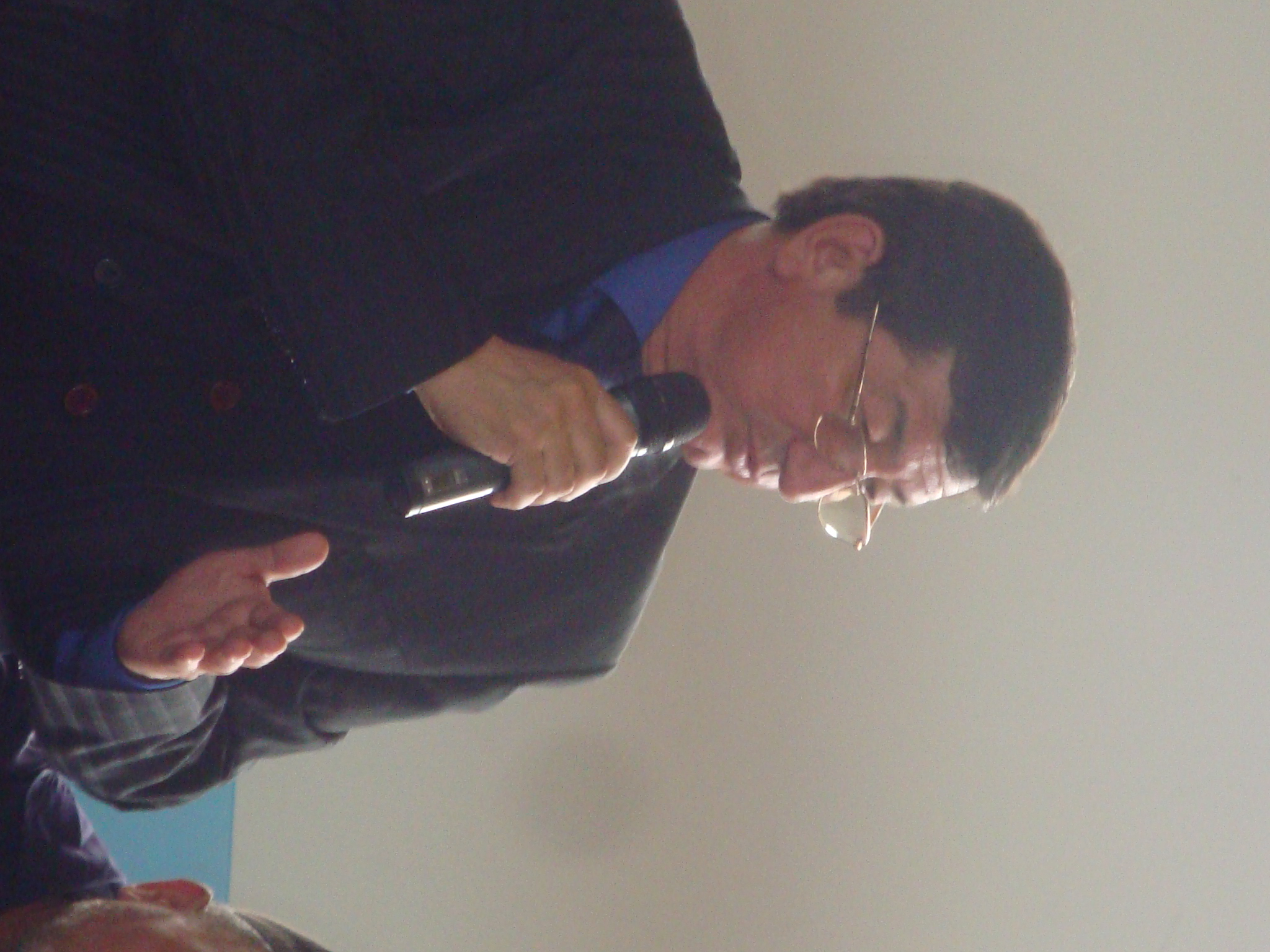
- Born: Qodirjon Botirov; 9 March 1956; Jalal-Abad, Kyrgyz SSR
- Died: 4 December 2018 (aged 62); Odesa, Ukraine
- Occupations: businessman, politician

Kadyrzhan Batyrov (Uzbek: Qodirjon Botirov, Қодиржон Ботиров; Russian: Кадыржан Батыров; 9 March 1956 – 4 December 2018) was a Kyrgyz businessman and politician of Uzbek origin.

== Biography ==
He was also head of the University of People's Friendship and a parliamentary deputy. Last years he resided in Sweden. He fled from Kyrgyzstan to Ukraine in 2010. Batyrov received a life sentence in absentia for his alleged role in ethnic conflicts in southern Kyrgyzstan in summer 2010. In September 2011 he applied for political asylum in Ukraine. In October 2011 Ukrainian prosecutors granted a request to extradite him to Kyrgyzstan. Prosecutors eventually withdrew permission to extradite Batyrov after UNHCR helped him to receive an offer of asylum in Sweden.

He died in his sleep in Odesa, Ukraine.
