= COVID-19 pandemic in Kyrgyzstan =

Ongoing COVID-19 viral pandemic in Kyrgyzstan

- Disease: COVID-19
- Pathogen: SARS-CoV-2
- Location: Kyrgyzstan
- First outbreak: Wuhan, Hubei, China
- Arrival date: 18 March 2020 (6 years, 5 months and 4 days)
- Confirmed cases: 179,036
- Recovered: 173,796
- Deaths: 2,614

Government website
- covid.kg med.kg

The COVID-19 pandemic in Kyrgyzstan was a part of the worldwide pandemic of coronavirus disease 2019 (COVID-19) caused by severe acute respiratory syndrome coronavirus 2 (SARS-CoV-2). The virus was confirmed to have reached Kyrgyzstan in March 2020.

== Background ==
On 12 January 2020, the World Health Organization (WHO) confirmed that a novel coronavirus was the cause of a respiratory illness in a cluster of people in Wuhan City, Hubei Province, China, which was reported to the WHO on 31 December 2019.

The case fatality ratio for COVID-19 has been much lower than SARS of 2003, but the transmission has been significantly greater, with a significant total death toll.

== Timeline ==
Cases

Deaths

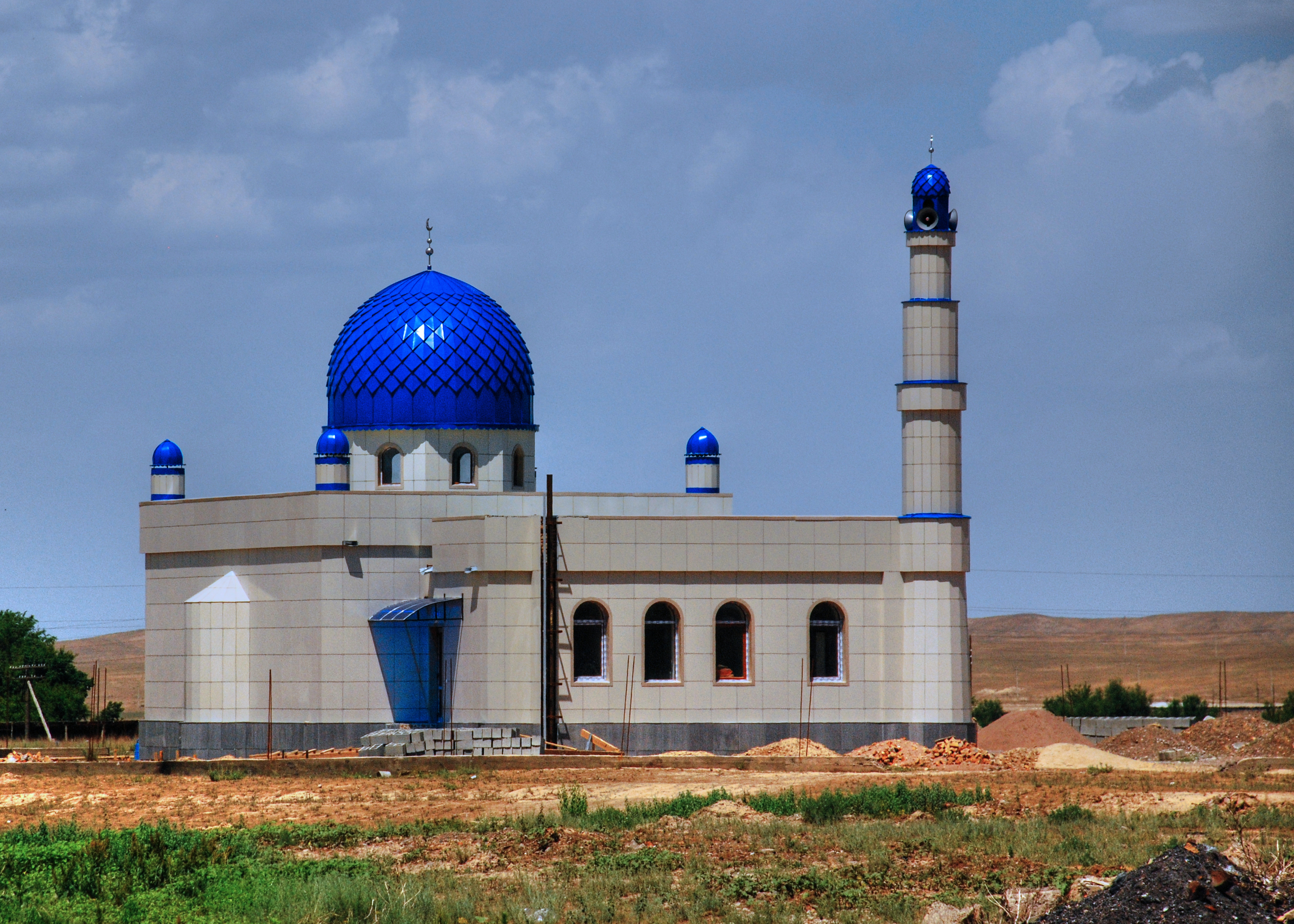
The Kyrgyz government has ordered the closure of Mosques for Friday prayer and has banned large gatherings

On 18 March 2020, the first three cases in the country were confirmed, after a citizen returned from Saudi Arabia according to the nation's health ministry, prior to the first reported case Kyrgyzstan closed its borders to foreigners. Kyrgyzstan, along with neighboring Tajikistan, Kazakhstan, and Uzbekistan have also taken measures to limit or ban large public gatherings, as well as banning Friday prayers at mosques. The health ministry also confirmed that all three suspected COVID-19 carriers were currently in quarantine. On the same day, the Prime Minister of Kyrgyzstan ruled that medical face masks being imported and exported from Kyrgyzstan would be exempt from value-added taxes.

On 20 March 2020, three new cases were reported in Nookat District, Osh Region in southern Kyrgyzstan. Those infected had also recently returned from a religious pilgrimage to Saudi Arabia. A state of emergency was declared in the district.

The government declared a one-month state of emergency starting 22 March 2020. On the same day, all public transportation ceased operation in Bishkek, with exception of trolleybuses, as a precondition measure aimed at containing the spread of the virus in the capital.

On 24 March 2020, the government issued a decree declaring the state of emergency from 25 March until 15 April in three major cities of Bishkek, Osh and Jalal-Abad, while local emergencies were declared in three provincial districts. In Bishkek, curfew was imposed from 20:00-07:00 local time, and checkpoints on the roads were established in and out of the city.

== Statistics ==
On July 17 Kyrgyzstan government announced that COVID-19 statistics will include both positive COVID-19 cases, as well as certain pneumonia cases that show similarities to COVID-19, in the name of transparency.

Due to hospitals being overwhelmed, categorizing between COVID-19 and pneumonia deaths became impractical - making many pneumonia cases probable COVID cases.

=== New COVID-19 cases in Kyrgyzstan by region ===
New COVID-19 cases in Kyrgyzstan by region

March–April 2020
Source	Regions									Cases (Note: Reported, confirmed cases. Actual case numbers may be higher.)				Deaths			Active cases	Severe cases		Medical staff cases		Recovered				Analysed samples		
Date	! class="nowrap ts-vertical-header " style="" | Bishkek City	! class="nowrap ts-vertical-header " style="" | Osh City	! class="nowrap ts-vertical-header " style="" | Chüy Region	! class="nowrap ts-vertical-header " style="" | Osh Region	! class="nowrap ts-vertical-header " style="" | Jalal-Abad Region	! class="nowrap ts-vertical-header " style="" | Batken Region	! class="nowrap ts-vertical-header " style="" | Naryn Region	! class="nowrap ts-vertical-header " style="" | Issyk-Kul Region	! class="nowrap ts-vertical-header " style="" | Talas Region	New	Total	Diff	7d avg	New	Total	Diff	Active cases	Total	Intubated	Total	% of all cases	New	Total	Diff	% of all cases	Daily tested	Total	Suspected
2020-03-12																												
2020-03-13																												303
2020-03-14																												
2020-03-15																												
2020-03-16																												
2020-03-17																												
2020-03-18					3						3						3											300
2020-03-19					3						3						3											528
2020-03-20				3	3					3	6	100.0%					6											410
2020-03-21				3	8	1				6	12	100.0%					12	1										
2020-03-22			2	3	8	1				2	14	16.7%					14	1										
2020-03-23			2	5	8	1				2	16	14.3%					16	1										
2020-03-24			2	20	19	1				26	42	162.5%	14				42	1										
2020-03-25			4	20	19	1				2	44	4.8%	20				44	1										585
2020-03-26			4	20	19	1					44		25				44	6										
2020-03-27			4	27	26	1				14	58	31.8%	33				58	1										
2020-03-28			4	27	26	1					58		39				58											
2020-03-29	7	8	3	24	40	1	1			26	84	44.8%	49				84											
2020-03-30	7	8	3	24	50	1	1			10	94	11.9%	61				91						3		3.2%			1459
2020-03-31	8	8	4	29	51	1	4	2		13	107	13.8%	70				104	3	1				3		2.8%			1592
2020-04-01	8	8	5	29	54	1	4	2		4	111	3.7%	79				108						3		2.7%	884	9128	1588
2020-04-02	8	10	5	30	54	3	4	2		5	116	4.5%	90				111	5	2			2	5	66.7%	4.3%	1008	9618	
2020-04-03	14	10	6	30	61	3	4	2		14	130	12.1%	100		1		124	4	1	8	6,2%		5		3.8%	112	9730	1900
2020-04-04	15	12	6	35	67	3	4	2		14	144	10.8%	112	1	2	100%	136	6	1	9	6,3%	1	6	20.0%	4.2%	321	10157	1666
2020-04-05	20	12	4	35	67	3	4	2		3	147	2.1%	121		2		136	5	2	9	6,1%	3	9	50.0%	6.1%			1454
2020-04-06	25	14	5	80	80	4	5	3		69	216	46.9%	139	2	4	100%	202	5	2	9	4,2%	1	10	11.1%	4.6%			
2020-04-07	25	20	5	86	80	4	5	3		12	228	5.6%	156		4		201	10		19	8,3%	13	23	130.0%	10.1%			1756
2020-04-08	35	33	7	97	81	4	10	3		42	270	18.4%	179		4		241	9	5	32	11,9%	2	25	8.7%	9.3%			1097
2020-04-09	36	36	7	98	86	4	10	3		10	280	3.7%	202		4		246	10	5	34	12,1%	5	30	20.0%	10.7%		15117	
2020-04-10	42	36	15	98	89	4	10	4		18	298	6.4%	226	1	5	25%	254	8	5	39	13,1%	9	39	30.0%	13.1%	1979	20575	
2020-04-11	54	42	18	116	89	4	12	4		41	339	13.8%	254		5		290	9	5	51	15,0%	5	44	12.8%	13.0%	2107	22682	1100
2020-04-12	59	54	21	119	89	4	25	6		38	377	11.2%	287		5		318	11	6	63	16,7%	10	54	22.7%	14.3%	1674	24356	1025
2020-04-13	69	59	27	128	91	5	34	6		42	419	11.1%	316		5		347	11	6	79	18,9%	13	67	24.1%	16.0%	753	24901	947
2020-04-14	77	59	28	128	93	5	34	6		11	430	2.6%	345		5		354	13	9	79	18,4%	4	71	6.0%	16.5%	1019	26147	974
2020-04-15	82	71	28	130	93	5	34	6		19	449	4.4%	370		5		366	11	7	98	21,8%	7	78	9.9%	17.4%	981	27033	902
2020-04-16	87	71	28	131	93	5	45	6		17	466	3.8%	397		5		370	11	4	98	21,0%	13	91	16.7%	19.5%	985	27951	872
2020-04-17	102	73	28	135	93	5	45	8		23	489	4.9%	424		5		370	13	4	116	23,7%	23	114	25.3%	23.3%	1133	29550	857
2020-04-18	102	74	28	140	93	5	56	8		17	506	3.5%	448		5		371	12	6	116	22,9%	16	130	14.0%	25.7%	1850	30868	1075
2020-04-19	111	83	30	147	102	6	67	8		48	554	9.5%	473		5		416	16	9	134	24,2%	3	133	2.3%	24.0%	770	31659	1000
2020-04-20	115	87	32	147	105	6	68	8		14	568	2.5%	495	2	7	40%	360	16	8	140	24,6%	68	201	51.1%	35.4%	809	32974	862
2020-04-21	115	87	32	147	105	6	68	8		14	568	2.5%	495		7		367	12	5	147	24,9%	15	216	7.1%	36.6%	1756	35072	714
2020-04-22	133	97	34	151	109	6	74	8		22	612	3.7%	541		7		351	12	5	157	25,7%	38	254	17.6%	41.5%	1707	36081	682
2020-04-23	141	101	38	154	109	6	74	8		19	631	3.1%	564	1	8	14.3%	321	11	5	162	25,7%	48	302	18.9%	47.9%	2125	39615	914
2020-04-24	147	104	42	157	109	6	83	8		25	656	4.0%	588		8		326	12	5	172	26.2%	20	322	6.6%	49.1%	3925	43784	914
2020-04-25	151	108	43	157	109	6	83	8		9	665	1.4%	611		8		312	13	6	175	26.3%	23	345	7.1%	51.9%	1871	43159	1354
2020-04-26	158	109	44	159	111	8	85	8		17	682	2.6%	629		8		304	13	6	180	26.4%	25	370	7.2%	54.3%		45627	1183
2020-04-27	164	110	46	160	111	8	86	10		13	695	1.9%	647		8		292	12	7	183	26.3%	25	395	6.8%	56.8%		46626	1044
2020-04-28	167	110	52	160	113	8	88	10		13	708	1.9%	664		8		284	12	6	185	26.1%	21	416	5.3%	58.8%	1283	49484	1012
2020-04-29	180	110	52	161	113	9	94	10		21	729	3.0%	681		8		284	10	4	191	26.2%	21	437	5.0%	59.9%	1795	50775	1000
2020-04-30	183	111	61	163	114	9	95	10		17	746	2.3%	697		8		276	12	6	195	26.1%	25	462	5.7%	61.9%		51472	864

Source	Regions									Cases				Deaths			Active cases	Severe cases		Medical staff cases		Recovered				Analysed samples		
Date	! class="nowrap ts-vertical-header " style="" | Bishkek City	! class="nowrap ts-vertical-header " style="" | Osh City	! class="nowrap ts-vertical-header " style="" | Chüy Region	! class="nowrap ts-vertical-header " style="" | Osh Region	! class="nowrap ts-vertical-header " style="" | Jalal-Abad Region	! class="nowrap ts-vertical-header " style="" | Batken Region	! class="nowrap ts-vertical-header " style="" | Naryn Region	! class="nowrap ts-vertical-header " style="" | Issyk-Kul Region	! class="nowrap ts-vertical-header " style="" | Talas Region	New	Total	Diff	7d avg	New	Total	Diff	Active cases	Total	Intubated	Total	% of all cases	New	Total	Diff	% of all cases	Daily tested	Total	Suspected
2020-05-01	188	111	61	166	114	10	96	10		10	756	1.3%	712		8		244	11	5	198	26.2%	42	504	9.1%	66.7%		52748	874
2020-05-02	191	113	61	167	118	12	97	10		13	769	1.7%	726		8		234	11	5	200	26.0%	23	527	4.6%	68.5%		53580	828
2020-05-03	205	113	70	169	118	13	97	10		26	795	3.4%	743	2	10	25.0%	221	11	5	207	26.0%	37	564	7.0%	70.9%		55620	741
2020-05-04	231	113	72	169	123	14	98	10		35	830	4.4%	762		10		245	13	6	216	26.0%	11	575	2.0%	69.3%		56488	908
2020-05-05	239	113	72	169	123	14	103	10		13	843	1.6%	781	1	11	10.0%	232	8	5	217	25.7%	25	600	4.3%	71.2%	2370	58030	917
2020-05-06	255	113	74	169	129	18	103	10		28	871	3.3%	801	1	12	9.1%	245	7	4	221	25.4%	14	614	3.4%	70.5%	1571	59490	675
...																												
2020-05-14	296	114	152	181	151	24	152	12		38	1082	3.6%	1063		12		335	7	5	248	22.9%	9	735	1.2%	67.9%	2322		1534
2020-05-15	302	118	156	182	153	24	163	13		29	1111	2.7%	1079	2	14	16.7%	352	5	3	248	22.3%	10	745	1.4%	67.1%	2010	75308	1532
...																												
2020-06-08	789	232	161	236	166	32	398	18		25	2032	1.2%	1938	1	23	4.5%	564	13	3	400	19.7%	20	1445	1.4%	71.1%	2359		2127
...																												
2020-06-16	1023	280	226	261	186	36	416	33	11	100	2472	4.2%		2	29	7.4%	596	32	6	474	19.2%	34	1847	1.9%	74.7%	3624		1671
...																												
2020-06-30	2,337	651	732	484	336	77	484	129	66	279	5,296	5.6%		7	57	14.0%	2,869	93	23	830	15.7%	76	2,370	3.3%	44.8%	3,444		?
2020-07-01	2,532	656	907	489	360	90	494	129	78	439	5,735	8.3%		5	62	8.8%	3,230	93	19	879	15.3%	73	2,443	3.1%	42.6%	3,281		?
2020-07-02	2,743	675	1138	495	387	108	497	139	79	526	6,261	9.2%		4	66	6.5%	3,665	110	24	921	14.7%	87	2,530	3.6%	40.4%	3,281		?
2020-07-03	2,973	711	1289	509	408	127	506	164	80	506	6,767	8.1%		10	76	15.2%	4,036	99	19	994	14.7%	125	2,655	4.9%	39.2%	2,955		?
2020-07-04	3,122	756	1354	517	416	139	528	181	81	327	7,094	4.8%		2	78	2.6%	4,302	104	18	1065	15.0%	59	2,714	2.2%	38.3%	2,780		?
2020-07-05	3,284	783	1385	530	416	152	546	200	81	283	7,377	4.0%		10	88	12.8%	4,487	102	16	1097	14.9%	88	2,802	3.2%	38.0%	1,975		
2020-07-06	3,445	824	1410	556	431	162	561	221	81	314	7,691	4.3%		4	92	4.5%	4,756	100	22	1147	14.9%	41	2,843	1.5%	37.0%	2,292		
2020-07-07	3,674	856	1494	579	478	172	572	234	82	450	8,141	5.9%		7	99	7.6%	5,126	98	21	1225	15.0%	73	2,916	2.6%	35.8%	2,253		
2020-07-08	3,857	878	1545	586	501	193	586	258	82	345	8,486	4.2%		13	112	13.1%	5,391	89	17	1287	15.2%	67	2,983	2.3%	35.2%	3,286		
2020-07-09	4,007	921	1604	614	526	213	604	275	83	361	8,847	4.3%		4	116	3.6%	5,678	90	14	1370	15.5%	70	3,053	2.3%	34.5%	2,600		
2020-07-10	4,267	948	1708	634	555	229	630	301	86	511	9,358	5.8%		6	122	5.2%	6,102	104	24	1450	15.5%	81	3,134	2.7%	33.5%	2,672		
2020-07-11	4,581	972	1832	647	581	257	647	307	86	552	9,910	5.9%		3	125	2.5%	6,549	119	25	1529	15.4%	102	3,236	3.3%	32.7%	2,767		
2020-07-12	5,081	1009	1928	667	591	291	648	322	92	719	10,629	7.3%		7	132	5.6%	7,110	124	24	1656	15.6%	151	3,387	4.7%	31.9%	2,479		
2020-07-13	5,346	1054	1965	693	642	334	652	337	94	488	11,117	4.6%		15	147	11.4%	7,510	121	21	1781	16.0%	73	3,460	2.2%	31.1%	1,456		
2020-07-14	5,522	1112	2052	699	682	355	653	368	95	421	11,538	3.8%		2	149	1.4%	6,394	128	21	1875	16.3%	1535	4,995	44.4%	43.3%	3,095		
2020-07-15	5,694	1165	2122	729	714	421	654	382	96	439	11,977	3.8%		11	160	7.4%	6,503	139	18	1980	16.5%	319	5,314	6.4%	44.4%	3,095		
2020-07-16	5,967	1203	2196	745	757	460	654	412	104	521	12,498	4.4%		7	167	4.4%	6,699	150	16	2076	16.6%	318	5,632	6.0%	45.1%	2,266		
2020-07-17	6,267	1270	2278	787	805	513	654	418	109	603	13,101	4.8%		6	173	3.6%	6,832	159	21	2199	16.8%	464	6,096	8.2%	46.5%	2,406		
+Pneum											+10,682				+687		+6065			+0 ?!			+3930					
2020-07-18	12,704	1645	3443	1938	1781	930	1146	1279	636	1264	24,984	5.3%		73	933	8.5%	12,947	1402	70	2269	9.1%	1141	11,167	11.4%	44.6%	2,558		
2020-07-19	13,073	1796	3566	2116	1821	1000	1177	1310	673	1485	26,532	5.9%		70	1,003	7.5%	13,201	?				1161	12,328	10.4%	46.5%	?		
2020-07-20	13,373	1873	3658	2171	1857	1034	1182	1322	673	611	27,143	2.3%		34	1,037	3.4%	12,997	?	?	2381	8.8%	781	13,109	6.3%	48.3%	?		
2020-07-21	13,696	1873	3780	2388	1964	1095	1236	1476	743	1108	28,251	4.1%		42	1,079	4.1%	12,396	1656	141	2428	8.6%	1667	14,776	12.7%	52.3%	2,695		
2020-07-22	13,930	1985	3956	2498	2057	1153	1271	1705	804	1108	29,359	3.9%		44	1,123	4.1%	12,476	?	?	2478	8.4%	984	15,760	6.7%	53.7%	2,778		
2020-07-23	14,132	2085	4050	2634	2214	1216	1312	1843	840	967	30,326	3.3%		46	1,169	4.1%	12,366	?	?	2527	8.3%	1031	16,791	6.5%	55.4%	2,754		
2020-07-24	14,405	2160	4190	2725	2352	1266	1334	1950	865	921	31,247	3.0%		42	1,211	3.6%	11,998	?	?	2580	8.3%	1247	18,038	7.4%	57.7%	2,564		
2020-07-25	14,662	2220	4261	2844	2443	1324	1354	2072	944	877	32,124	2.8%		38	1,249	3.1%	11,672	?	?	2633	8.2%	1165	19,203	6.5%	59.8%	?		
2020-07-26	14,852	2294	4350	2902	2572	1354	1378	2127	984	689	32,813	2.1%		28	1,277	2.2%	11,148	?	?	2661	8.1%	1185	20,388	6.2%	62.1%	?		
2020-07-27	15,006	2353	4371	2941	2642	1386	1387	2199	1011	483	33,296	1.5%		24	1,301	1.9%	10,790	?	?	2683	8.1%	817	21,205	4.0%	63.7%	?		
2020-07-28	15,145	2386	4407	3006	2743	1411	1423	2282	1041	548	33,844	1.6%		28	1,329	2.2%	10,219	?	?	2691	8.0%	1091	22,296	5.1%	65.9%	?		
2020-07-29	15,263	2466	4489	3056	2858	1438	1438	2439	1065	668	34,512	2.0%		18	1,347	1.4%	9,822	?	?	2711	7.9%	1047	23,343	4.7%	67.6%	?		
2020-07-30	15,381	2555	4570	3130	2943	1488	1451	2533	1092	631	35,143	1.8%		17	1,364	1.3%	9,305	?	?	2743	7.8%	1131	24,474	4.8%	69.6%	?		
2020-07-31	15,602	2607	4612	3211	3045	1535	1464	2615	1114	662	35,805	1.9%		14	1,378	1.0%	8,901	?	?	2768	7.7%	1052	25,526	4.3%	71.3%	?		
2020-08-01	15,714	2673	4645	3306	3098	1558	1480	2709	1116	494	36,299	1.4%		19	1,397	1.4%	8,476	?	?	2790	7.7%	900	26,426	3.5%	72.8%	?		
2020-08-02	15,826	2692	4658	3361	3177	1579	1495	2807	1124	420	36,719	1.2%		12	1,409	0.9%	8,036	?	?	2809	7.6%	848	27,274	3.2%	74.3%	?		
2020-08-03	15,920	2739	4691	3440	3214	1613	1507	2873	1132	410	37,129	1.1%		11	1,420	0.8%	7,782	?	?	2829	7.6%	653	27,927	2.4%	75.2%	?		
2020-08-04	16,034	2782	4728	3479	3284	1643	1528	2914	1149	412	37,541	1.1%		7	1,427	0.5%	7,371	?	?	2854	7.6%	816	28,743	2.9%	76.6%	?		
2020-08-05	16,224	2866	4773	3543	3331	1685	1541	2955	1192	569	38,110	1.5%		11	1,438	0.8%	7,162			2874	7.5%	767	29,510	2.7%	77.4%			
2020-08-06	16,386	2947	4811	3614	3375	1745	1553	3000	1228	549	38,659	1.4%		9	1,447	0.6%	7,113			2911	7.5%	589	30,099	2.0%	77.9%			
2020-08-07	16,511	2998	4839	3688	3428	1792	1562	3081	1263	503	39,162	1.3%		4	1,451	0.3%	6,947			2928	7.5%	665	30,764	2.2%	78.6%			
2020-08-08	16,635	3029	4875	3735	3506	1837	1578	3122	1270	425	39,587	1.1%		9	1,460	0.6%	6,846			2938	7.4%	517	31,281	1.7%	79.0%			
2020-08-09	16,743	3056	4906	3782	3539	1874	1587	3147	1285	332	39,919	0.8%		8	1,468	0.5%	6,629			2948	7.4%	541	31,822	1.7%	79.7%			
2020-08-10	16,827	3080	4923	3807	3576	1909	1597	3168	1290	258	40,177	0.6%		6	1,474	0.4%	6,474			2959	7.4%	407	32,229	1.3%	80.2%			
2020-08-11	16,931	3099	4944	3841	3616	1936	1610	3185	1293	278	40,455	0.7%		4	1,478	0.3%	6,213			2967	7.3%	535	32,764	1.7%	81.0%			
2020-08-12	17,019	3120	4971	3883	3644	1979	1621	3222	1300	304	40,759	0.8%		6	1,484	0.4%	6,248			2981	7.3%	263	33,027	0.8%	81.0%			
2020-08-13	17,118	3136	4986	3918	3698	1998	1629	3277	1309	310	41,069	0.8%		3	1,487	0.2%	6,264			2991	7.3%	291	33,318	0.9%	81.1%			
2020-08-14	17,191	3155	5010	3950	3737	2040	1634	3333	1323	304	41,373	0.7%		4	1,491	0.3%	6,260			3006	7.3%	304	33,622	0.9%	81.3%			
2020-08-15	17,238	3198	5034	3978	3771	2053	1644	3398	1331	272	41,645	0.7%		2	1,493	0.1%	6,201			3018	7.2%	329	33,951	1.0%	81.5%			
2020-08-16	17,284	3212	5053	4004	3798	2075	1647	3445	1338	211	41,856	0.5%		2	1,495	0.1%	6,055			3030	7.2%	355	34,306	1.0%	82.0%			
2020-08-17	17,319	3213	5074	4017	3823	2094	1650	3460	1341	135	41,991	0.3%		1	1,496	0.1%	5,928			3035	7.2%	261	34,567	0.8%	82.3%			
+Death revise															-445													
2020-08-18	17,359	3224	5087	4031	3847	2106	1661	3484	1347	155	42,146	0.4%		2	1,053	0.1%	6,208			3038	7.2%	318	34,885	0.9%	82.8%			
2020-08-19	17,398	3232	5104	4055	3873	2128	1664	3523	1348	179	42,325	0.4%		1	1,054	0.1%	6,074			3045	7.2%	312	35,197	0.9%	83.2%			
...																												
2020-09-20	17,869	3,434	5,495	4,321	4,471	2,687	1,737	3,945	1,457	81	45,416	0.2%			1,063		2,775			3,199	7.0%	94	41,578	0.2%	91.5%			
Date										New	Total	Diff	7d avg	New	Total	Diff	Active cases	Total	Intubated	Total	% of all cases	New	Total	Diff	% of all cases	Daily tested	Total	Suspected
Date	! class="nowrap ts-vertical-header " style="" | Bishkek City	! class="nowrap ts-vertical-header " style="" | Osh City	! class="nowrap ts-vertical-header " style="" | Chüy Region	! class="nowrap ts-vertical-header " style="" | Osh Region	! class="nowrap ts-vertical-header " style="" | Jalal-Abad Region	! class="nowrap ts-vertical-header " style="" | Batken Region	! class="nowrap ts-vertical-header " style="" | Naryn Region	! class="nowrap ts-vertical-header " style="" | Issyk-Kul Region	! class="nowrap ts-vertical-header " style="" | Talas Region	New	Total	Diff	7d avg	New	Total	Diff	Active cases	Total	Intubated	Total	% of all cases	New	Total	Diff	% of all cases	Daily tested	Total	Suspected
Source: Ministry of Health of the Kyrgyz Republic	Regions									Cases				Deaths			Active cases	Severe cases		Medical staff cases		Recovered				Analysed samples		
Regions										Total cases				Total deaths				Total severe cases				Total recoveries				Total analysed samples		
Total cases	6 267	1 270	2 278	787	805	513	654	418	109	13 101 (243.5 per 100k pop) (603 new)				173 (3.22 per 100k pop) CFR=2.76%				159 (2.3% of active cases) Currently intubated: 21				6 096 (46.5% of all cases) (464 new)				xxxxx (xxxx per 100k pop)		
Cases per 100k	595	406	237	58	65	95	226	84	41	13 101 (243.5 per 100k pop) (603 new)				173 (3.22 per 100k pop) CFR=2.76%				159 (2.3% of active cases) Currently intubated: 21				6 096 (46.5% of all cases) (464 new)				xxxxx (xxxx per 100k pop)		
Total deaths	57	10	41	20	12	9	17	4	3	13 101 (243.5 per 100k pop) (603 new)				173 (3.22 per 100k pop) CFR=2.76%				159 (2.3% of active cases) Currently intubated: 21				6 096 (46.5% of all cases) (464 new)				xxxxx (xxxx per 100k pop)		
Deaths per 100k	5.4	3.2	4.3	1.5	1.0	1.7	5.9	0.8	1.1	13 101 (243.5 per 100k pop) (603 new)				173 (3.22 per 100k pop) CFR=2.76%				159 (2.3% of active cases) Currently intubated: 21				6 096 (46.5% of all cases) (464 new)				xxxxx (xxxx per 100k pop)		
CFR	3.48%	1.94%	6.73%	5.81%	3.63%	6.16%	3.38%	6.45%	8.33%	13 101 (243.5 per 100k pop) (603 new)				173 (3.22 per 100k pop) CFR=2.76%				159 (2.3% of active cases) Currently intubated: 21				6 096 (46.5% of all cases) (464 new)				xxxxx (xxxx per 100k pop)		
Active cases (Note: Not equal with Active cases amount.)	4 600	755	1 669	443	474	367	151	356	73	13 101 (243.5 per 100k pop) (603 new)				173 (3.22 per 100k pop) CFR=2.76%				159 (2.3% of active cases) Currently intubated: 21				6 096 (46.5% of all cases) (464 new)				xxxxx (xxxx per 100k pop)		
Active per 100k	436	242	174	32	38	68	52	72	27	13 101 (243.5 per 100k pop) (603 new)				173 (3.22 per 100k pop) CFR=2.76%				159 (2.3% of active cases) Currently intubated: 21				6 096 (46.5% of all cases) (464 new)				xxxxx (xxxx per 100k pop)		
Calculating on 17 July 2020. (Note: On July 18 government stopped to report sex and age deathes data such as severe cases amount.) (Note: Not include 785 deathes of pneumonia which reported without details of sex/age/location.) Source: Akipress. Notes										6 190			47.2%	106			61.3%	1.71%				Male				Sex		
Calculating on 17 July 2020. Source: Akipress. Notes										6 911			52.8%	67			37.7%	0.97%				Female				Sex		
Calculating on 17 July 2020. Source: Akipress. Notes																						Unspecified				Sex		
Calculating on 17 July 2020. Source: Akipress. Notes																						0-9				Age		
Calculating on 17 July 2020. Source: Akipress. Notes																						10-19				Age		
Calculating on 17 July 2020. Source: Akipress. Notes														1			0.6%					20-29				Age		
Calculating on 17 July 2020. Source: Akipress. Notes														8			4.6%					30-39				Age		
Calculating on 17 July 2020. Source: Akipress. Notes														14			8.1%					40-49				Age		
Calculating on 17 July 2020. Source: Akipress. Notes														48			27.7%					50-59				Age		
Calculating on 17 July 2020. Source: Akipress. Notes														56			32.4%					60-69				Age		
Calculating on 17 July 2020. Source: Akipress. Notes														33			19.1%					70-79				Age		
Calculating on 17 July 2020. Source: Akipress. Notes														12			6.9%					80-89				Age		
Calculating on 17 July 2020. Source: Akipress. Notes														1			0.6%					90+				Age		
Calculating on 17 July 2020. Source: Akipress. Notes																						Unspecified				Age		

=== New COVID-19 cases in Kyrgyzstan by region table (2nd wave) ===
New COVID-19 cases in Kyrgyzstan by region (2nd wave)
Source	Regions									All cases			Active cases			Deaths			Recovered				Medical staff cases					
Date	! class="nowrap ts-vertical-header " style="" | Bishkek City	! class="nowrap ts-vertical-header " style="" | Osh City	! class="nowrap ts-vertical-header " style="" | Chüy Region	! class="nowrap ts-vertical-header " style="" | Osh Region	! class="nowrap ts-vertical-header " style="" | Jalal-Abad Region	! class="nowrap ts-vertical-header " style="" | Batken Region	! class="nowrap ts-vertical-header " style="" | Naryn Region	! class="nowrap ts-vertical-header " style="" | Issyk-Kul Region	! class="nowrap ts-vertical-header " style="" | Talas Region	Total	New	Diff	Total	Diff	per 100K	Total	New	Diff	Total	New	Diff	per 100K	Total	New	% of all cases	Rec	New rec	% rec of all medic cases
2020-09-20	10	2	5	8	20	19		14	3	45416	81	0.2%	2775	-13	49.6	1063			41578	94	0.2%	744	3199	2	7.0%	2801	22	87.6%
2020-09-21	8	1	1	7	4	25	2	2	5	45471	55	0.1%	2726	-49	48.7	1063			41682	104	0.3%	745	3202	3	7.0%	2822	21	88.1%
2020-09-22	4	2	8	17	13	20		5	2	45542	71	0.2%	2683	-43	48.0	1063			41796	114	0.3%	747	3203	1	7.0%	2847	25	88.9%
2020-09-23	9	1	8	24	8	29	1	5	3	45630	88	0.2%	2663	-20	47.6	1063			41904	108	0.3%	749	3208	5	7.0%	2874	27	89.6%
2020-09-24	19	8	4	38	20	29	2	4	3	45757	127	0.3%	2689	26	48.1	1063			42005	101	0.2%	751	3214	6	7.0%	2896	22	90.1%
2020-09-25	18	22	5	50	22	41	3	7	7	45932	175	0.4%	2722	33	48.7	1063			42147	142	0.3%	754	3227	13	7.0%	2918	22	90.4%
2020-09-26	22	9	12	22	34	43	3	11	2	46090	158	0.3%	2725	3	48.7	1063			42302	155	0.4%	756	3234	7	7.0%	2937	19	90.8%
2020-09-27	29	13	9	33	23	45	2	6	1	46251	161	0.3%	2735	10	48.9	1063			42453	151	0.4%	759	3239	5	7.0%	2951	14	91.1%
2020-09-28	19	8	6	18	10	37	2	3	1	46355	104	0.2%	2672	-63	47.8	1064	1	0.1%	42619	166	0.4%	762	3241	2	7.0%	2976	25	91.8%
2020-09-29	9	5	15	38	31	55	2	11	1	46522	167	0.4%	2697	25	48.2	1064			42761	142	0.3%	765	3243	2	7.0%	2992	16	92.3%
2020-09-30	19	13	10	34	41	17		11	2	46669	147	0.3%	2726	29	48.7	1064			42879	118	0.3%	767	3255	12	7.0%	3008	16	92.4%
2020-10-01	18,043	3,527	5,584	4,623	4,700	3,105	1,754	4,020	1,485																			
2020-10-01	18	11	11	21	23	77		10	1	46841	172	0.4%	2794	68	50.0	1064			42983	104	0.2%	769	3266	11	7.0%	3021	13	92.5%
2020-10-02	17	19	23	41	40	63	1	10	1	47056	215	0.5%	2854	60	51.0	1065	1	0.1%	43137	154	0.4%	771	3294	28	7.0%	3029	8	92.0%
2020-10-03	22	8	2	33	17	38	2	6		47184	128	0.3%	2840	-14	50.8	1066	1	0.1%	43278	141	0.3%	774	3304	10	7.0%	3038	9	91.9%
2020-10-04	26	25	8	62	79	33	3	6	2	47428	244	0.5%	2944	104	52.6	1066			43418	140	0.3%	776	3318	14	7.0%	3049	11	91.9%
2020-10-05	26	4	8	34	46	75	1	9	4	47635	207	0.4%	3048	104	54.5	1066			43521	103	0.2%	778	3327	9	7.0%	3059	10	91.9%
2020-10-06	20	22	19	9	21	59	5	9		47799	164	0.3%	3089	41	55.2	1066			43644	123	0.3%	780	3336	9	7.0%	3063	4	91.8%
2020-10-07	57	20	10	61	47	89	1	5	8	48097	298	0.6%	3230	141	57.8	1069	3	0.3%	43798	154	0.4%	783	3354	18	7.0%	3069	6	91.5%
2020-10-08	77	13	17	62	44	19	2	8	3	48342	245	0.5%	3312	82	59.2	1073	4	0.4%	43957	159	0.4%	786	3364	10	7.0%	3072	3	91.3%
2020-10-09	40	25	28	49	47	74		10	2	48617	275	0.6%	3473	161	62.1	1077	4	0.4%	44067	110	0.3%	788	3379	15	7.0%	3075	3	91.0%
2020-10-10	53	17	16	69	59	71	3	12	7	48924	307	0.6%	3615	142	64.6	1082	5	0.5%	44227	160	0.4%	791	3393	14	6.9%	3081	6	90.8%
2020-10-11	53	54	20	52	63	41	9	12	2	49,230	306	0.6%	3,750	135	67.1	1,085	3	0.3%	44,395	168	0.4%	794	3,415	22	6.9%	3,085	4	90.3%
2020-10-12	59	33	13	51	40	86		13	3	49,528	298	0.6%	3,916	166	70.0	1,090	5	0.5%	44,522	127	0.3%	796	3,437	22	6.9%	3,089	4	89.9%
2020-10-13	81	18	21	46	77	83		17		49,871	343	0,7%	4,067	151	72,7	1,092	2	0,2%	44,712	190	0,4%	800	3,449	12	6,9%	3,096	7	89,8%
2020-10-14	68	36	12	74	70	43		18	9	50,201	330	0,7%	4,223	156	75,5	1,094	2	0,2%	44,884	172	0,4%	803	3,456	7	6,9%	3,105	9	89,8%
2020-10-15	59	55	19	50	86	83	1	19	16	50,589	388	0,8%	4,410	187	78,9	1,099	5	0,5%	45,080	196	0,4%	806	3,488	32	6,9%	3,113	8	89,2%
2020-10-16	70	44	34	147	65	52		15	4	51,020	431	0,9%	4,629	219	82,8	1,103	4	0,4%	45,288	208	0,5%	810	3,508	20	6,9%	3,128	15	89,2%
2020-10-17	98	38	32	97	98	82	1	17	7	51,490	470	0,9%	4,873	244	87,1	1,108	5	0,5%	45,509	221	0,5%	814	3,529	21	6,9%	3,145	17	89,1%
2020-10-18	88	38	46	105	143	90	6	26	12	52,044	554	1,1%	5,197	324	92,9	1,111	3	0,3%	45,736	227	0,5%	818	3,534	5	6,8%	3,157	12	89,3%
2020-10-19	73	54	14	93	125	107	1	8	7	52,526	482	0,9%	5,552	355	99,3	1,111			45,863	127	0,3%	820	3,544	10	6,7%	3,166	9	89,3%
2020-10-20	42	67	27	52	57	118		15	6	52,910	384	0,7%	5,658	106	101,2	1,113	2	0,2%	46,139	276	0,6%	825	3,545	1	6,7%	3,184	18	89,8%
2020-10-21	125	37	53	82	117	97	4	24	10	53,459	549	1,0%	5,897	239	105,5	1,118	5	0,4%	46,444	305	0,7%	831	3,555	10	6,6%	3,200	16	90,0%
Date	Bishkek	Osh	Chuy Region	Osh Region	Jalal-Abad Region	Batken Region	Naryn Region	Issyk Kul Region	Talas Region	All cases			Active cases			Deaths			Recovered				Medical staff cases					
Total cases (Note: Reported, confirmed cases. Actual case numbers may be higher.)	19,072	4,117	5,953	5,810	5,924	4,411	1,790	4,255	1,578	52,910 (946.2 per 100k pop) (384 new)			5,897 (105.5 per 100k pop) (13,201 highest rate)			1,113 (20.0 per 100k pop) CFR=2.36%			46,139 (825.1 per 100k pop) (276 new)				xxxxx (xxxx per 100k pop)					
Cases per 100k	1,810	1,317	620	425	478	821	618	858	590	52,910 (946.2 per 100k pop) (384 new)			5,897 (105.5 per 100k pop) (13,201 highest rate)			1,113 (20.0 per 100k pop) CFR=2.36%			46,139 (825.1 per 100k pop) (276 new)				xxxxx (xxxx per 100k pop)					
Total deaths	678	54	195	163	141	62	83	96	56	52,910 (946.2 per 100k pop) (384 new)			5,897 (105.5 per 100k pop) (13,201 highest rate)			1,113 (20.0 per 100k pop) CFR=2.36%			46,139 (825.1 per 100k pop) (276 new)				xxxxx (xxxx per 100k pop)					
Deaths per 100k	64.8	17.9	20.3	12.9	11.4	12.8	29.3	19.4	21.3	52,910 (946.2 per 100k pop) (384 new)			5,897 (105.5 per 100k pop) (13,201 highest rate)			1,113 (20.0 per 100k pop) CFR=2.36%			46,139 (825.1 per 100k pop) (276 new)				xxxxx (xxxx per 100k pop)					
CFR, %%	3.86%	1.70%	3.76%	3.29%	2.77%	2.15%	4.75%	2.47%	3.92%	52,910 (946.2 per 100k pop) (384 new)			5,897 (105.5 per 100k pop) (13,201 highest rate)			1,113 (20.0 per 100k pop) CFR=2.36%			46,139 (825.1 per 100k pop) (276 new)				xxxxx (xxxx per 100k pop)					
Active (Note: Not equal with Active cases amount.)	1,398	886	767	466	829	1,201	0	213	60	52,910 (946.2 per 100k pop) (384 new)			5,897 (105.5 per 100k pop) (13,201 highest rate)			1,113 (20.0 per 100k pop) CFR=2.36%			46,139 (825.1 per 100k pop) (276 new)				xxxxx (xxxx per 100k pop)					
Active per 100k	133	283	80	34	67	223		43	22	52,910 (946.2 per 100k pop) (384 new)			5,897 (105.5 per 100k pop) (13,201 highest rate)			1,113 (20.0 per 100k pop) CFR=2.36%			46,139 (825.1 per 100k pop) (276 new)				xxxxx (xxxx per 100k pop)					
Calculating on October 20, 2020. Source: Akipress. Notes
