= Turgun Mashrapova =

Soviet and Kyrgyz politician (1928–2026)

- Тургун Машрапова

Member of the Supreme Soviet of the Soviet Union
- In office 1974–1979

Personal details
- Born: 16 May 1928 Kyzyl-Ordo, Kirghyz ASSR, Russian SFSR, USSR
- Died: June 2026 (aged 98) Osh Region, Kyrgyzstan
- Profession: Politician

Turgun Mashrapova (Kyrgyz: Тургун Машрапова; 16 May 1928 – June 2026) was a Soviet-Kyrgyz politician who was a member of the Supreme Soviet of the Soviet Union (1974–1979).

== Death ==
Mashrapova died in June 2026, at the age of 98.
