= 2016 in Kyrgyzstan =

- Decades: 1990s; 2000s; 2010s; 2020s
- See also: Other events of 2016; Timeline of Kyrgyz history

Events in the year 2016 in Kyrgyzstan.

== Incumbents ==
- President – Almazbek Atambayev
- Prime Minister – Temir Sariyev (until April); Sooronbay Jeenbekov (from April)

== Events ==
- September 3–8: 2016 World Nomad Games in Cholpon-Ata, Kyrgyzstan.
- December 11: Referendum on changing the Constitution of Kyrgyzstan.
