= Sadyr Japarov's third government =

The Sadyr Japarov III government has governed Kyrgyzstan since 13 October 2021.

== Ministers ==
- Chairman of the Cabinet of Ministers – Ulukbek Maripov.
  - First Deputy Chairman – Artyom Novikov
  - Deputy Chairman — Ulukbek Karymshakov
- Minister of Economy and Finance – Ulukbek Karymshakov
- Minister of Defense – Taalaibek Omuraliev
- Minister of Foreign Affairs – Ruslan Kazakbayev
- Minister of Justice – Asel Chinbayeva
- Minister of Internal Affairs – Ulan Niyazbekov
- Minister of Education and Science – Almazbek Beyshenaliev
- Minister of Health and Social Development – Alymkadyr Beyshenaliev
- Minister of Transportation, Architecture, Construction and Communication – Gulmira Abdralieva
- Minister of Energy and Industry – Kubanychbek Turdubayev
- Minister of Agriculture, Water Resources and Regional Development – Askarbek Janybekov
- Minister of Emergency Situations – Boobek Ajikeev
- Minister of Culture, Information, Sports and Youth Policy – Kayrat Iymanaliev
- Chairman of the State Committee for National Security – Kamchybek Tashiev
- Head of the Government Office — Jenishbek Asankulov, Minister of Economy and Finance.
