= 2005 in Kyrgyzstan =

- Decades: 1980s; 1990s; 2000s; 2010s; 2020s
- See also: Other events of 2005; Timeline of Kyrgyz history

This article is a list of events in the year 2005 in Kyrgyzstan.

== Incumbents ==
- President: Askar Akayev (until March 24), Ishenbai Kadyrbekov (March 24 to March 25), Kurmanbek Bakiyev (from March 25)
- Prime Minister: Nikolai Tanayev (until March 25), Kurmanbek Bakiyev (March 25 to June 20, July 10 to August 15), Medetbek Kerimkulov (June 20 to July 10), Felix Kulov (from August 15)

== Events ==
=== February ===
- February 23 - Thousands protest in support for the opposition who has been barred from the upcoming elections.

=== March ===
- March 20 - After allegations of fraud in the parliamentary election, tens of thousands of protesters take to the streets and take the town of Jalal-Abad, demanding President Akayev step down.
- March 21 - The Tulip Revolution begins as protesters take the second largest city in Kyrgyzstan, Osh.
- March 23 - Riot police break up a protest in the capital of Bishkek. President Akayev sacks his ministers for their "poor work" in handling the protests.
- March 24 - The protesters have overrun the presidential palace and the opposition plans for new elections. President Akayev is reported to have resigned and fled Bishkek by helicopter.
- March 29 - Kurmanbek Bakiyev is sworn in as interim President as Akayev states he is ready to resign.
