= 2015 in Kyrgyzstan =

- Decades: 1990s; 2000s; 2010s; 2020s
- See also: Other events of 2015; Timeline of Kyrgyz history

The following events occurred in Kyrgyzstan in the year 2015.

== Incumbents ==
- President: Almazbek Atambayev
- Prime Minister: Djoomart Otorbaev (until May 1), Temir Sariyev (starting May 1)

== Events ==
=== January ===
- January 1 - The Eurasian Economic Union will come into effect, creating a political and economic union between Russia, Belarus, Armenia, Kazakhstan and Kyrgyzstan.

=== May ===
- May 9 - A Victory Day Parade is held at Ala-Too Square for the first time in honor of the 70th jubilee anniversary of the end of the Great Patriotic War.
