= 2019 in Kyrgyzstan =

- Decades: 1990s; 2000s; 2010s; 2020s
- See also: Other events of 2019; Timeline of Kyrgyz history

Events in the year 2019 in Kyrgyzstan.

== Incumbents ==
- President – Sooronbay Jeenbekov
- Prime Minister – Mukhammedkalyi Abylgaziev

== Deaths ==
- 21 December – Bolotbek Shamshiyev, film director (b. 1941).
