= Chorobek Baigazakov =

Kyrgyz politician (1946–2022)

Member of the Supreme Councill of Kyrgyzstan
- In office 31 August 1991 – 1995

Member of the Supreme Soviet of the Kirghiz Soviet Socialist Republic
- In office 1990 – 31 August 1995

Personal details
- Born: 5 December 1946 Bash-Kayyngdy, Kirghiz SSR, Soviet Union
- Died: 3 February 2022 (aged 75)
- Education: Kyrgyz National University

Chorobek Baigazakov (Russian: Чоробек Байгазаков; 5 December 1946 – 3 February 2022) was a Soviet and Kyrgyz politician. He served in the Supreme Council from 1990 to 1995, which was called the Supreme Soviet of the Kirghiz Soviet Socialist Republic until 31 August 1991. He died on 3 February 2022, at the age of 75.
