= 2017 in Kyrgyzstan =

- Decades: 1990s; 2000s; 2010s; 2020s
- See also: Other events of 2017; Timeline of Kyrgyz history

Events from the year 2017 in Kyrgyzstan

== Incumbents ==
- President – Almazbek Atambayev (until November); Sooronbay Jeenbekov (from 24 November)
- Prime Minister – Sooronbay Jeenbekov (until August); Muhammetkaliy Abulgaziyev (acting 22–26 August); Sapar Isakov (from 26 August)

== Events ==
- 16 January – a Boeing 747-412F flying Turkish Airlines Flight 6491 crashed during landing at its scheduled stopover at Manas International Airport in Bishkek. A total of 39 people were killed in the accident.
- 5 September – Uzbek President Shavkat Mirziyoyev becomes the first Uzbek leader to visit Bishkek in 17 years.
- 15 October – the 2017 Kyrgyz presidential election. The election was won by Sooronbay Jeenbekov, who was inaugurated as president on 24 November.
- 24 November – Sooronbay Jeenbekov, took the oath of office as head of state during his inauguration on 24 November.

== Deaths ==
- 16 July – Zhibek Nukeeva, beauty queen, Miss Kyrgyzstan 2013 (b. 1995).
