= 2023 in Kyrgyzstan =

- Decades: 2000s; 2010s; 2020s
- See also: Other events of 2023; Timeline of Kyrgyz history

This is a list of individuals and events related to Kyrgyzstan in 2023.

== Incumbents ==
Photo	Post	Name
	President of Kyrgyzstan	Sadyr Japarov
	Prime Minister of Kyrgyzstan	Akylbek Japarov

== Events ==
- 3 August – The Kyrgyzstan Emergency Situations Ministry declares an emergency in the Tüp District due to flooding.
- 1 September – Twenty-five people are arrested after a riot at a kok-boru event breaks out in Kyrgyzstan on Independence Day.
- 26 October – Ulan Japarov, the nephew of Kyrgyzstan President Sadyr Japarov, is placed under house arrest for the remainder of his prison sentence until November 26 after being sentenced for corruption charges.
- 3 November – Kyrgyzstan warns their citizens to not travel to fight against Israel.
- 20 December – The Parliament of Kyrgyzstan votes 59–5 in favor of passing a bill to modify the national flag. The proposed changes are not yet official.

== Deaths ==
- 3 February – Gennady Bazarov, 80, filmmaker
- 9 March – Marat Sarulu, 65, film director and screenwriter
- 6 August – Ahmed Anarbayev, 75, Olympic swimmer (1968).

== See also ==
- Outline of Kyrgyzstan
- List of Kyrgyzstan-related topics
- History of Kyrgyzstan
