= Moldomusa Kongantiyev =

Kyrgyzstani politician (1958–2022)

Moldomusa Tashbolotovich Kongantiyev (Kyrgyz: Молдомуса Ташболотович Конгантиев; 31 March 1958 – 12 February 2022) was a Kyrgyzstani politician who served as Interior Minister of Kyrgyzstan until April 2010.

Kongantiyev was born on 31 March 1958. In April 2010, there were conflicting media reports as to whether Kongantiyev was killed in Talas or taken hostage during the 2010 Kyrgyzstan riots. The Interior Ministry of Kyrgyzstan denied reports about Kongantiyev's death, and on 8 April 2010 he was shown heavily beaten up, but alive, in a television report. Opposition leader Bolotbek Sherniyazov was named new interim interior minister.

He died on 12 February 2022, at the age of 63.
