= Day of the People's April Revolution =

Kyrgyz national holiday

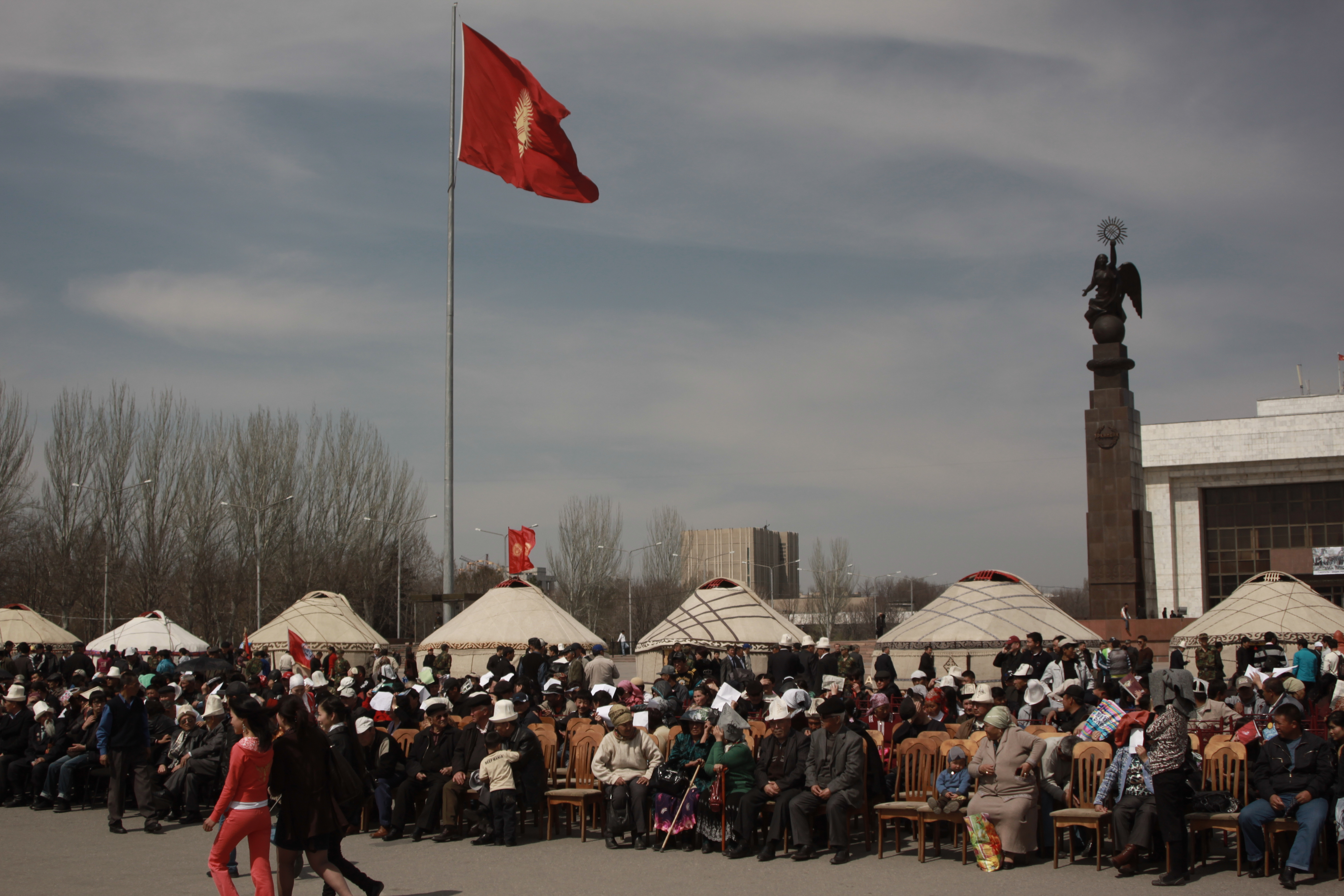
A memorial tribute on Ala-Too Square in 2011.

The Day of the People's April Revolution is a national holiday in Kyrgyzstan that commemorates the Kyrgyz Revolution of 2010. Kyrgyz President Almazbek Atambaev signed a presidential decree authorizing the public holiday on April 4, 2016. On April 7, 2010, protesters led by opposition leaders stormed the parliament building in Bishkek and took over the headquarters of several major broadcasters. Roza Otunbayeva was then chosen as head of the Interim Government.The anniversary of the Revolution was declared a public holiday in 2011. and became a non-working holiday in 2016.

== See also ==
- Public holidays in Kyrgyzstan
