= Defender of the Fatherland Day =

Holiday observed in several former Soviet republics

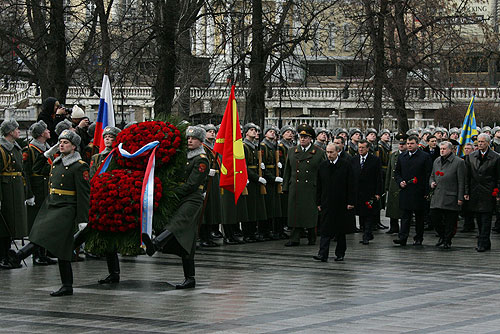
- Wreath-laying ceremony at the Tomb of the Unknown Soldier in Moscow, 23 February 2008
- Observed by: Russia, Belarus, Kyrgyzstan, Kazakhstan, and Tajikistan
- Significance: Celebrates the armed forces and commemorates the founding of the Red Army
- Observances: Wreath laying ceremonies, concerts, parades
- Date: 23 February
- Next time: 23 February 2026
- Frequency: Annual

Defender of the Fatherland Day (Russian: День защитника Отечества Den' zashchitnika Otechestva; Kazakh: Отан қорғаушы күні, romanized: Otan qorğauşy künı; Tajik: Рӯзи Дорандаи Ватан, romanized: Rūzi Dorandai Vatan; Kyrgyz: Мекенди коргоочулардын күнү, romanized: Mekendi korgoochulardyn künü; Belarusian: Дзень абаронцы Айчыны, romanized: Dzeń abaroncy Ajčyny) is a holiday observed in Russia, Turkmenistan, Belarus, Kyrgyzstan, Kazakhstan and Tajikistan honouring their countries' armed forces and commemorating the founding of the Red Army. It is celebrated on 23 February, except in Kazakhstan, where it is celebrated on 7 May. Ukraine abolished the holiday starting 1992 and, after the Revolution of Dignity, has instated the somewhat similar Defender of Ukraine Day on 1 October.

== History ==
First celebrated in 1919, the holiday marks the date in 1918 during the Russian Civil War when the first mass draft into the Red Army occurred in Petrograd and Moscow (on 17 February). In January 1919, it was decided to combine the celebration of that day with the anniversary of the publication of the decree on the establishment of the Red Army (of 18 February 1918). In 1919, 17 February fell on a Monday, so it was decided to move the holiday to the following Sunday, 23 February. That choice of day has been retained ever since. It was originally known as "Red Army Day" (Russian: День Красной Армии). In 1923, it was officially named Day of the Red Army and the Navy.

In 1949, it was renamed to Soviet Army and Navy Day (Russian: День Советской армии и Военно-морского флота, romanized: Dyen' Sovyetskoy armii i Voyenno-morskogo flota). Following the fall of the Soviet Union in 1991, the holiday was given its current name in 2002 by Russian president Vladimir Putin, who decreed it a state holiday (in Russia).

== Celebrations in Russia and worldwide ==
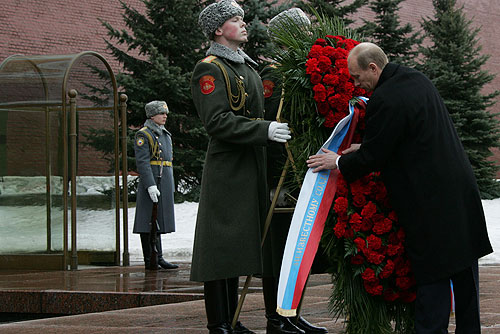
The 2008 holiday, with ceremonies being performed by President Putin

Officially, as the name suggests, the holiday celebrates people who are serving or were serving the Russian Armed Forces or the Soviet Armed Forces (both men and women, both military and civilian personnel), but unofficially, nationally it has also come to include the celebration of men as a whole, and to act as a counterpart of International Women's Day on 8 March.

The holiday is celebrated with parades and processions in honor of veterans, and women also give small gifts to men in their lives, especially husbands (or boyfriends, fiances), fathers, sons and brothers. As a part of the workplace culture, women often give small gifts to their male co-workers. Consequently, in colloquial usage, the holiday is often referred to as "Men's Day" (Russian: День мужчин, romanized: Den' muzhchin).

One of the holiday traditions in Moscow is a ceremony near the Kremlin, the laying of wreaths at the Tomb of the Unknown Soldier. The Russian president, the heads of both chambers of parliament, military leaders, representatives of other branches of government, heads of political parties as well as Russian Orthodox Church officials arrive at the Alexander Garden which is located near the Moscow Kremlin walls. After a moment of silence, the national anthem is played and a solemn march of an honour guard unit passes. In the evening, the country's leadership is present at a concert dedicated to the holiday on the State Kremlin Palace. Also in the evening in Moscow and in many other cities of Russia, fireworks are displayed.

=== In other countries ===
==== In Belarus ====
In Belarus, the holiday (known as Дзень абаронцы Айчыны in the Belarusian language) celebrates the date of 23 February 1918, the date of the formation of the armed forces of modern day Belarus. It was made an official holiday by President Alexander Lukashenko on 25 March 2004. Traditionally, on 23 February, the president of Belarus lays a wreath at the monument on Victory Square in Minsk. Being that they both celebrate the holiday, soldiers of the Armed Forces of Belarus and Russian Armed Forces soldiers also hold joint festive events on 23 February.

==== In Kazakhstan ====
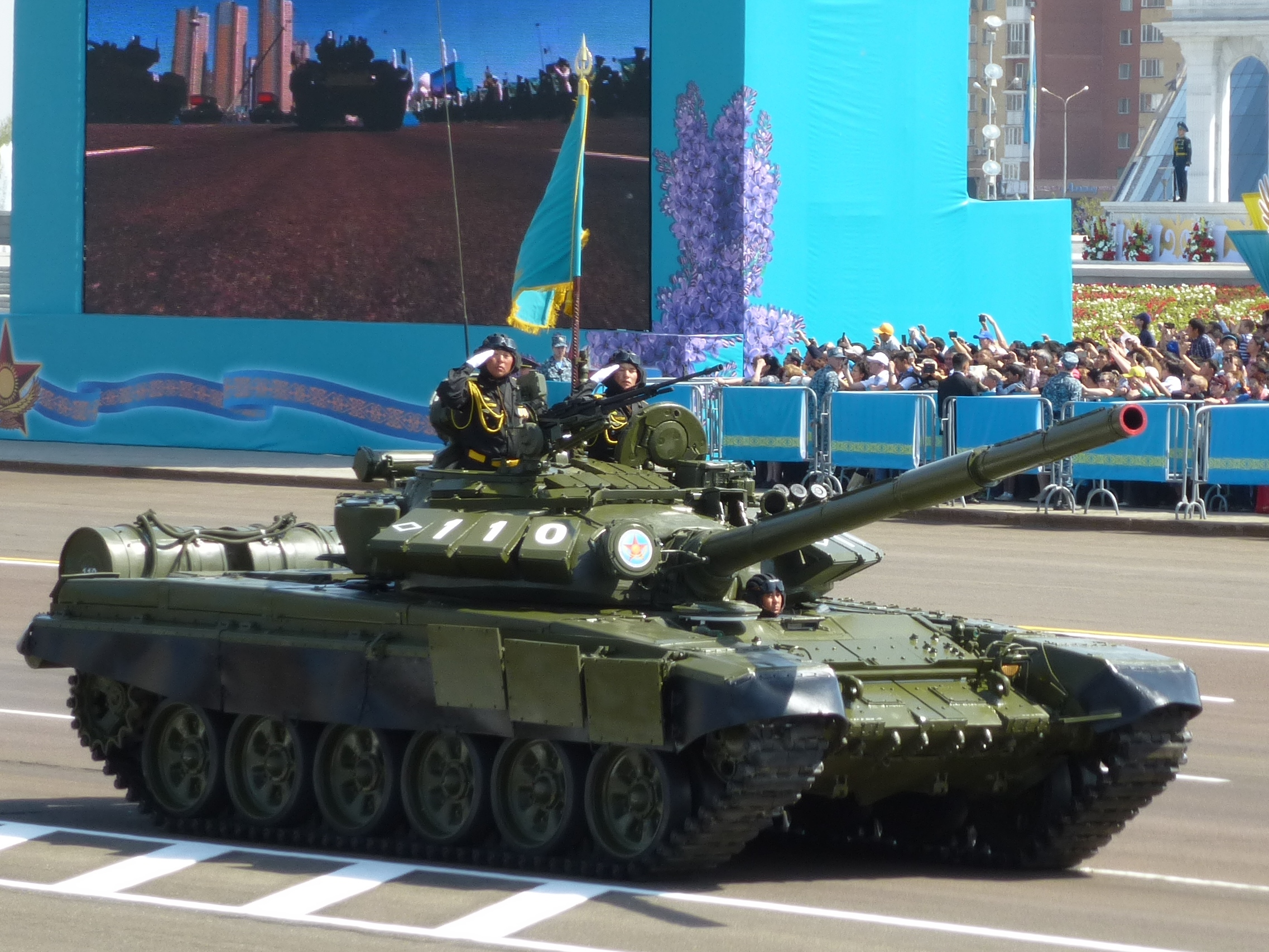
A T-72 tank during a Defender of the Fatherland Day parade in Astana, Kazakhstan, in 2015.

In Kazakhstan, Defender of the Fatherland Day is celebrated on 7 May. The Kazakh Armed Forces was established on this date 1992 and was only made national holiday in October 2012. The holiday often coincides with the Victory Day celebrations on 9 May.

==== In Kyrgyzstan ====
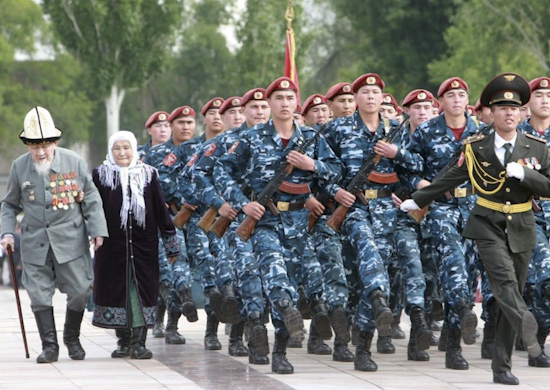
A Defender of the Fatherland Day parade in Bishkek, Kyrgyzstan, 2018.

In Kyrgyzstan, Defender of the Fatherland Day is a non-working holiday. In Bishkek, there is a military parade of the Bishkek Garrison. The holiday was first introduced in the country by the Government of Kyrgyzstan on 20 January 2003. Personnel of the Kyrgyz Army have their own professional holiday on 29 May, which is the Day of the Armed Forces of Kyrgyzstan.

==== In Tajikistan ====
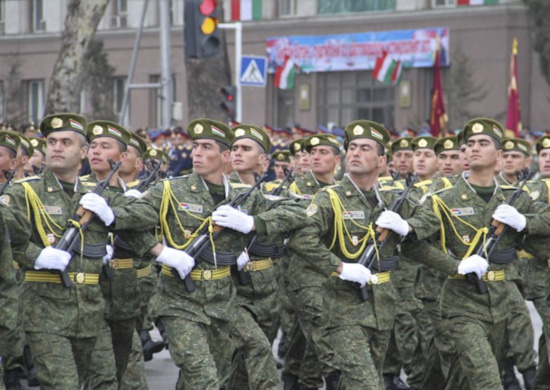
Armed Forces Day in Dushanbe, Tajikistan, 2013.

In Tajikistan, the holiday is known as "Tajik National Army Day" (Tajik: Рӯзи Артиши Миллӣ Тоҷик), celebrating the Tajik National Army. However, it has been known that other military units, such as the Tajik Air Force, have taken part in the celebration.

==== In Turkmenistan ====
Defender of the Fatherland Day (Turkmen: Watan goragçysynyň günü) in Turkmenistan is celebrated on 27 January, celebrating the anniversary of the founding of the Armed Forces of Turkmenistan. It was previously celebrated as Army Day until President Gurbanguly Berdimuhamedow changed its name in 2009. The Ministry of Defense organizes festive concerts and activities in military units on this day. The current military doctrine was adopted on the eve of the holiday in 2016.

==== In Ukraine ====
In Ukraine, Defender of the Fatherland Day (Ukrainian: День захисника Вітчизни/ Den' zakhysnyka Vitchyzny) was never celebrated as a state holiday. In 1999 President Leonid Kuchma recognized 23 February as Defenders of the Fatherland Day without, however, granting it any official status. President Petro Poroshenko made a statement on 24 August 2014, according to which, Ukraine "should not celebrate the holidays of the military-historical calendar of Russia, but will honor the defenders of our homeland, not someone else's". On 14 October 2014, a decree by Poroshenko instated the Defender of Ukraine Day, with its official holiday status. Armed Forces Day for the entire Armed Forces is celebrated yearly on 6 December with special programs and nationwide gun salutes and fireworks displays.

In the early 21st century, even though it was not a public holiday, many women on this day gave some extra attention to male relatives, friends, husbands and boyfriends, especially to those serving in the Armed Forces of Ukraine.

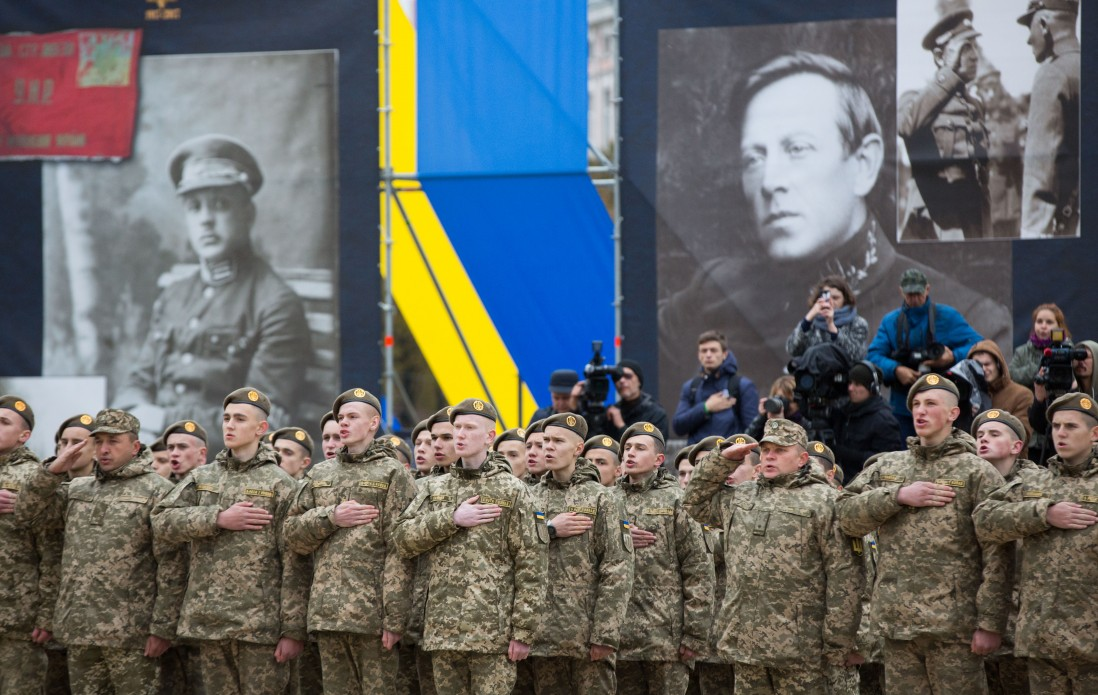
Soldiers taking the oath of allegiance in Kyiv, Ukraine, October 2017.

=== In states with limited recognition ===
==== In Transnistria ====
In the unrecognized state of Transnistria, Defender of the Fatherland Day is a public holiday. The main celebrations are held in Tiraspol. They are attended by the President of the republic and the heads of defence/law enforcement agencies. By decree of President Igor Smirnov on 13 June 2001, it was included in the list of professional holidays and is a non-working holiday.

==== In South Ossetia ====
23 February is an official holiday in the partially recognized Republic of South Ossetia. The country's leadership pay to veterans who served in the Soviet Army as well as all those who served in the Armed Forces of South Ossetia and died in the 1991–1992 South Ossetia War and the Russo-Georgian War. The holiday also coincide with festive events that surround the creation of the Ministry of Defense of the republic.

== See also ==
- Army Day (Armenia)
- Border Guards Day
- Day of the Armed Forces of Azerbaijan
- Defender of the Motherland Day
- Navy Day
- Personification of Russia
- Police and Internal Affairs Servicemen's Day
