= Chalong, Phuket =

Chalong ฉลอง
- Tambon
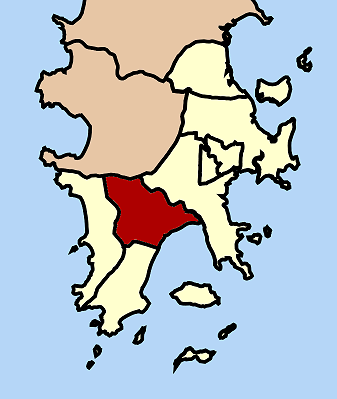
- Location of Chalong in Mueang Phuket
- Coordinates: 7°50′23″N 98°20′43″E
- Country: Thailand
- Province: Phuket
- District: Mueang Phuket

Area
  - Total: 34.069 km^{2} (13.154 sq mi)

Population (2005)
  - Total: 15,460
  - Density: 453.8/km^{2} (1,175/sq mi)
- Postal Code: 83000 (Villages 1-5); 83100 (Villages 6-10)
- Geocode: 830106

Chalong (Thai: ฉลอง, pronounced [t͡ɕʰā.lɔ̌ːŋ]) is a sub-district (tambon) in the southern portion of Phuket Province, Thailand. It is one of eight sub-districts in the capital district (amphoe mueang) Mueang Phuket.

== Sights ==
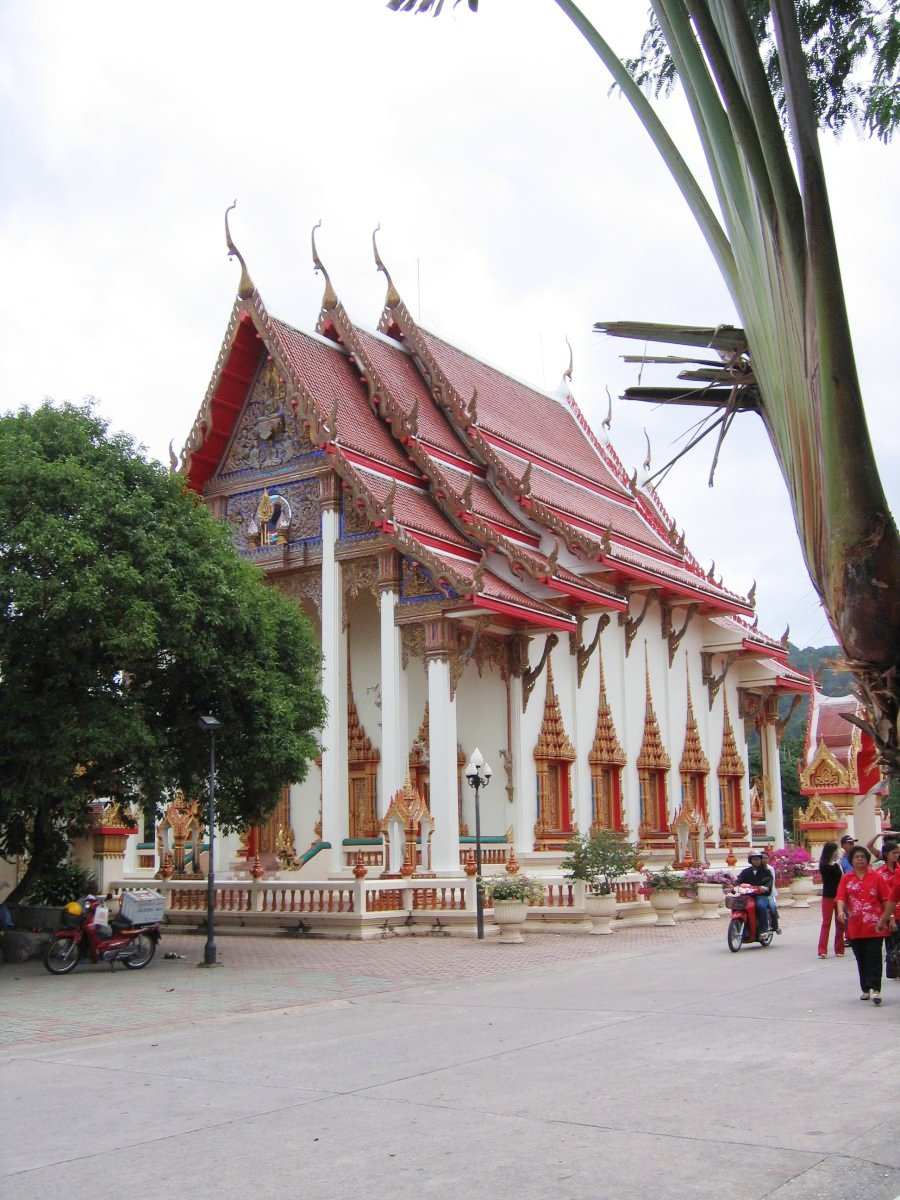
Wat Chalong

The most important of the 29 Buddhist temples on Phuket is Wat Chalong (วัดฉลอง, วัดไชยธาราราม). It is dedicated to two monks, Luang Pho Chaem (หลวงพ่อแช่ม) and Luang Pho Chuang (หลวงพ่อช่วง), who with their knowledge of herbal medicine helped the injured in a tin miners rebellion in 1876.

== Geography ==
Neighboring tambons are (from south clockwise) Rawai, Karon, Patong, and Kathu of Kathu District and Wichit. To the southeast is Chalong Bay, with one of the most touristy beaches on the island.

== Administration ==
The tambon is administered by a tambon administrative organization (TAO) created in 1995. It is divided into 10 villages (muban).

1. Khao Noi (เขาน้อย)
2. Bon Suan (บนสวน)
3. Pa Lai (ป่าไล่)
4. Na Yai (นาใหญ่)
5. Na Kok (นากก)
6. Chalong (ฉลอง)
7. Wat Mai (วัดใหม่)
8. Khok Sai (โคกทราย)
9. Khok Tanot (โคกโตนด)
10. Yot Sane (ยอดเสน่ห์)

== Climate ==
Climate data for Phuket (Station 48564, 07°53′N 98°24′E, 1961–1990)
Month	Jan	Feb	Mar	Apr	May	Jun	Jul	Aug	Sep	Oct	Nov	Dec	Year
Record high °C (°F)	35.5 (95.9)	36.2 (97.2)	37.5 (99.5)	36.8 (98.2)	36.0 (96.8)	35.0 (95.0)	34.0 (93.2)	34.5 (94.1)	33.3 (91.9)	33.9 (93.0)	33.4 (92.1)	33.5 (92.3)	37.5 (99.5)
Mean daily maximum °C (°F)	31.8 (89.2)	32.9 (91.2)	33.5 (92.3)	33.4 (92.1)	32.0 (89.6)	31.6 (88.9)	31.2 (88.2)	31.2 (88.2)	30.7 (87.3)	30.9 (87.6)	31.0 (87.8)	31.2 (88.2)	31.8 (89.2)
Daily mean °C (°F)	27.9 (82.2)	28.7 (83.7)	29.3 (84.7)	29.5 (85.1)	28.4 (83.1)	28.3 (82.9)	27.8 (82.0)	27.9 (82.2)	27.3 (81.1)	27.4 (81.3)	27.5 (81.5)	27.6 (81.7)	28.1 (82.6)
Mean daily minimum °C (°F)	23.3 (73.9)	23.7 (74.7)	24.3 (75.7)	24.8 (76.6)	24.5 (76.1)	24.5 (76.1)	24.2 (75.6)	24.4 (75.9)	23.9 (75.0)	23.8 (74.8)	23.8 (74.8)	23.7 (74.7)	24.1 (75.4)
Record low °C (°F)	17.8 (64.0)	17.1 (62.8)	18.5 (65.3)	21.1 (70.0)	20.7 (69.3)	20.5 (68.9)	21.0 (69.8)	20.7 (69.3)	21.2 (70.2)	21.0 (69.8)	19.8 (67.6)	17.2 (63.0)	17.1 (62.8)
Average precipitation mm (inches)	29.8 (1.17)	20.9 (0.82)	49.1 (1.93)	121.9 (4.80)	319.4 (12.57)	268.9 (10.59)	290.5 (11.44)	272.6 (10.73)	399.0 (15.71)	309.6 (12.19)	175.7 (6.92)	59.4 (2.34)	2,316.8 (91.21)
Average rainy days	4	3	5	11	21	19	19	19	23	22	16	8	170
Mean monthly sunshine hours	286.2	271.5	282.3	247.9	188.5	139.5	172.6	174.1	143.2	179.8	197.1	244.3	2,527
Source 1: Thai Meteorological Department, Hong Kong Observatory
Source 2: NOAA (sun, extremes)
