= Phuket province =

Province of Thailand

Phuket ภูเก็ต
- Province

Other transcription(s)
  - Southern Thai: ภูเก็ต (pronounced [pʰûː.két̚])
  - Malay: Bukit (Rumi) بوکيت (Jawi)
  - Hokkien: 普吉; Phóo-kiat (Tâi-lô)
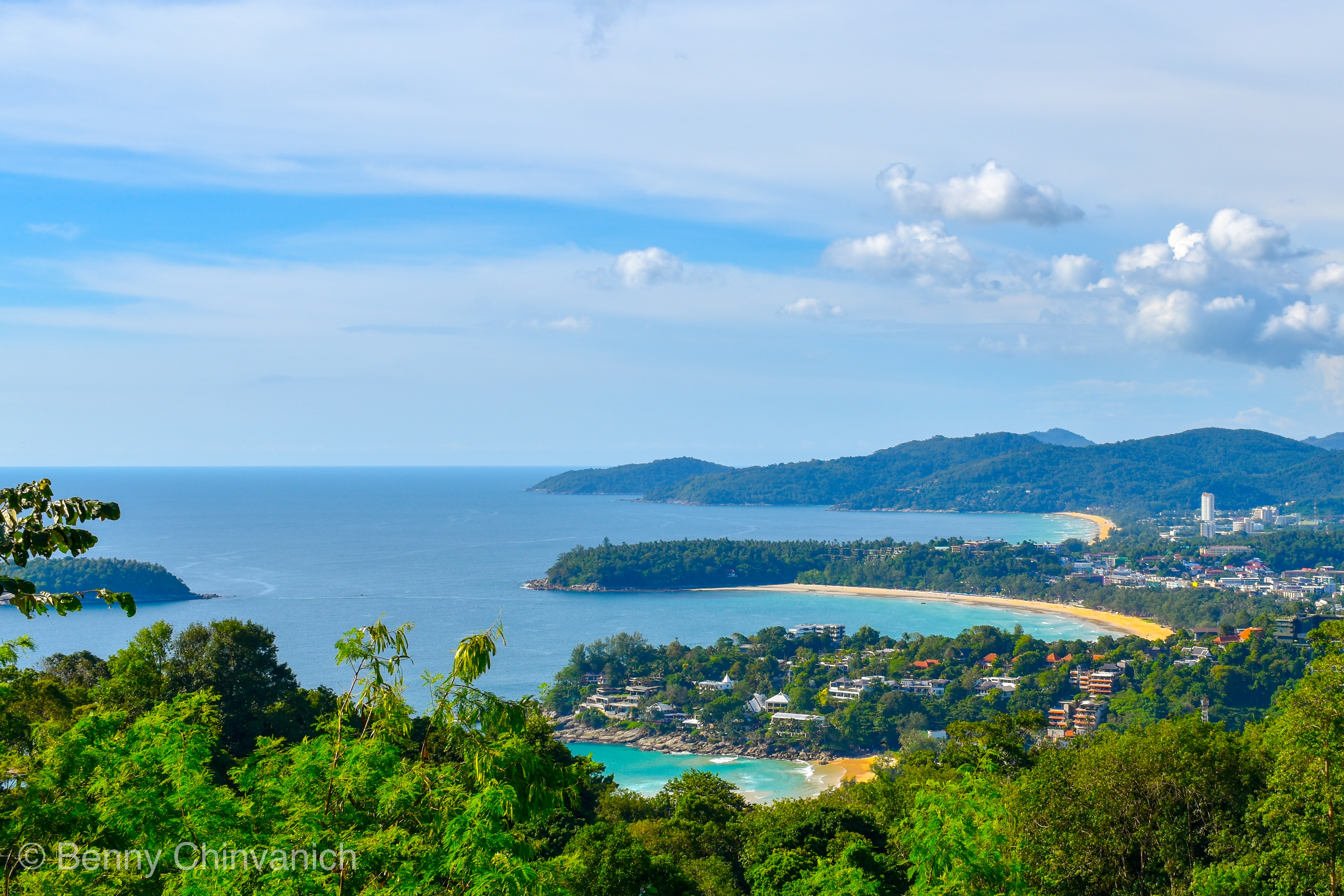
- Phuket viewpoint

- Flag Seal
- Nicknames: Junk Ceylon; Thalang
- Mottoes: ไข่มุกอันดามัน สวรรค์เมืองใต้ หาดทรายสีทอง สองวีรสตรี บารมีหลวงพ่อแช่ม ("Pearl of the Andaman. Heavenly City of the South. Golden beaches. Two heroines. Virtue of Luang Pho Chaem.")
- Map of Thailand highlighting Phuket province
- Coordinates: 7°53′24″N 98°23′54″E
- Country: Thailand
- Capital: Phuket (city)

Government
  - Governor: Sophon Suwannarat

Area
  - Total: 547 km^{2} (211 sq mi)
  - Rank: 76th

Population (2025)
  - Total: ▲432,464
  - Rank: 61st
  - Density: 786/km^{2} (2,040/sq mi)
  - Rank: 5th

Human Achievement Index
  - HAI (2022): 0.6399 "average" Ranked 41st

GDP
  - Total: baht 209 billion (US$7.5 billion) (2019)
- Time zone: UTC+7 (ICT)
- Postal code: 83xxx
- Calling code: 076
- ISO 3166 code: TH-83
- Website: phuket.go.th

Phuket Provincial Administrative Organization องค์การบริหารส่วนจังหวัดภูเก็ต
- Provincial Administrative Organization
- Interactive map of Phuket Provincial Administrative Organization

Government
  - Type: Local administrative divisions
  - Body: Phuket Provincial Administrative Organization
  - Chief Executive: Rewat Areerob
- Website: phuketpao.go.th

Phuket (/ˌpuːˈkɛt/ poo-KET; Thai: ภูเก็ต, [pʰūː.kèt], Malay: Bukit or Tongkah) is one of the southern provinces (changwat) of Thailand. It consists of the island of Phuket, the country's largest island, and another 32 smaller islands off its coast. Phuket lies off the west coast of mainland Thailand in the Andaman Sea. Phuket Island is connected by the Sarasin Bridge to Phang Nga province to the north. The next nearest province is Krabi, to the east across Phang Nga Bay.

Phuket province, encompassing an area of 547 km^{2} (211 sq mi), ranks as the second-smallest province in Thailand. Historically, Phuket Island was situated on a major trading route between India and China. This strategic location led to its frequent mention of foreign ships in the logs, including those from Portugal, France, the Netherlands, and England. Despite this attention from various European powers, Phuket was never colonized by any European nation.

Economically, the province's wealth was initially derived from tin and rubber production. Recently, Phuket has transitioned to tourism as its primary source of income. More than 100,000 foreigners are estimated to have settled in Phuket.

== Toponymy ==
The name Phuket (of which the digraph ph represents an aspirated /pʰ/) is derived from the corruption of the word Bukit (Jawi: بوکيت) in Malay which means 'hill', as this is what the island appears like from a distance. With its geographical location in the Malay Peninsula, Phuket was historically inhabited by the Austronesian Malays, before it was settled by the Thai due to southward expansions of Siamese kingdoms, most recently the Rattanakosin Kingdom.

Phuket was formerly known as Thalang (ถลาง Tha-Laang), which is also derived from the old Malay Telong (Jawi: تلوڠ) which means 'cape'. The northern district of the province, which was the location of the old capital, still uses this name. In Western sources and navigation charts, it was known as Junk Ceylon (a corruption of the Malay Tanjung Salang; Jawi: تنجوڠ سالڠ 'Cape Salang').

== History ==
Historical affiliations

Tambralinga before 1277

Kingdom of Nakhon Si Thammarat 1277–1782
Kingdom of Siam 1782–1932
Kingdom of Thailand 1932–2026

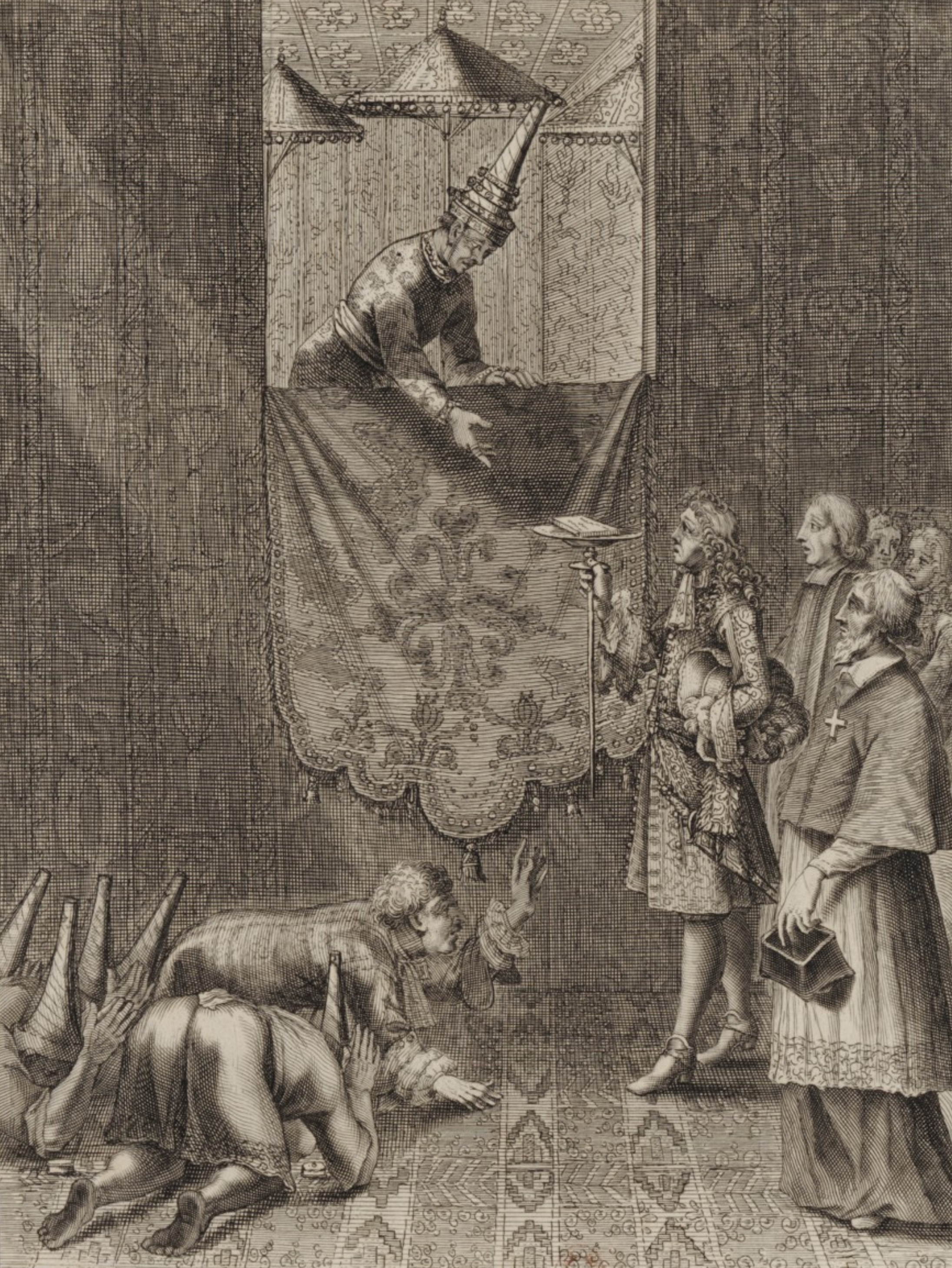
French ambassador Chevalier de Chaumont with King Narai

=== 16th–18th century: European contact ===
Fernão Mendes Pinto, a Portuguese explorer, arrived in Siam in 1545. His travel accounts provide insights into various parts of the country, including a detailed description of ports in the southern part of the Kingdom. Pinto's records are among the earliest European accounts to mention Phuket, which he referred to as Junk Ceylon a name used by the Portuguese in their maps. This designation appears seven times in his writings. According to Pinto, Junk Ceylon was a significant port of call for trading vessels, where they often stopped for supplies and provisions.

However, Pinto noted that during the mid-16th century, the island's prominence was in decline. This downturn was attributed to the presence of pirates and the challenging sea conditions, which made the area less favorable for merchant vessels. In addition to Phuket, Pinto's accounts also include references to other important port cities of the time, such as Patani and Ligor, the latter being the present-day Nakhon Si Thammarat.

During the 17th century, Junk Ceylon (now known as Phuket) was a focal point of international trade, particularly for its tin resources. The Dutch and English, and later the French after the 1680s, competed for trading opportunities on the island. In September 1680, the French East India Company's ship arrived at the island and departed with a cargo full of tin.

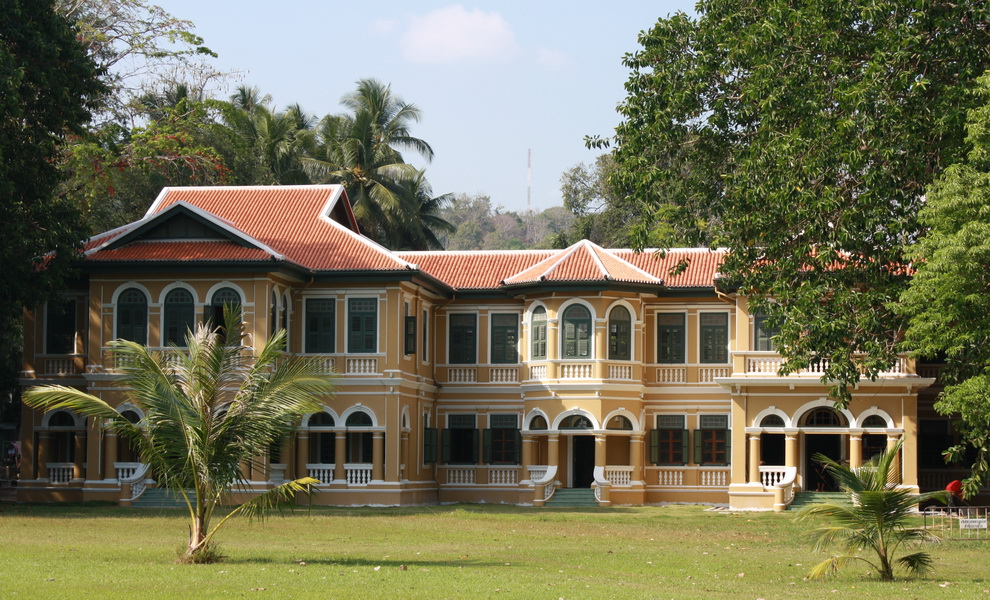
Stately Sino-Portuguese mansion in Phuket Town

To diminish Dutch and English influence in the region, the Siamese King Narai appointed a French medical missionary, Brother René Charbonneau of the Société des Missions Étrangères, as the governor of Junk Ceylon. Charbonneau held this position until 1685.

King Narai, in 1685, granted the French a tin monopoly in Phuket, formalized through an agreement with the French ambassador, the Chevalier de Chaumont. Subsequently, Sieur de Billy, previously the maître d'hôtel for Chaumont, was appointed as the governor of the island. However, following the Siamese revolution in 1688, the French presence in Siam was significantly reduced. On 10 April 1689, Desfarges led a military expedition to recapture Thalang in an attempt to re-establish French control in the region. This occupation was short-lived, with Desfarges returning to Puducherry in January 1690.

==== 1785: Burmese invasion ====
Before the Burmese assault on Thalang in 1785, during what is known as the "Nine Armies' Wars", Francis Light, a captain with the British East India Company, alerted the authorities in Phuket of the impending Burmese attack. Light's warning came at a time when the island's military governor had recently died, leading the Burmese to believe that Phuket could be easily conquered. However, Than Phu Ying Chan, the widow of the deceased governor, along with her sister Mook (คุณมุก), devised a strategic defense. They instructed the women of the island to dress as soldiers and position themselves along the walls of Thalang City. This ruse led the Burmese to overestimate the strength of the island's defenses, prompting them to abort their attack and eventually retreat after a month-long siege, which ended on 13 March 1785. In recognition of their bravery and ingenuity, King Rama I bestowed the titles Thao Thep Kasattri and Thao Si Sunthon upon the two sisters, celebrating them as heroines of Phuket.

The official seal of Phuket features a depiction of the Two Heroines Monument, located along Highway 402 in Phuket, in honor of the sisters. Encircled by a traditional Thai kranok pattern, This seal has been in use since 1985.

=== 19th–20th centuries ===
During the reign of King Chulalongkorn, also known as Rama V, from 1 October 1868 to 23 October 1910, Phuket was designated as the administrative center for the tin-producing southern provinces of Siam (now Thailand). King Chulalongkorn's tenure is noted for the modernization of the nation, encompassing governmental and social reforms, as well as negotiations involving territorial concessions to the British and French. Amid the pressures of Western expansionism during this period, King Chulalongkorn's leadership is credited with maintaining Siam's sovereignty and averting colonization.

In 1876, there was a significant uprising among Chinese laborers working in the tin mines of Phuket and its neighboring provinces. The unrest was reportedly influenced by the declining prices of tin and the government's stringent fiscal policies at the time.

Phuket underwent another administrative change in 1933 when Monthon Phuket (มณฑลภูเก็ต) was dissolved, leading to Phuket's establishment as a separate province.

=== 21st century (2001–present) ===
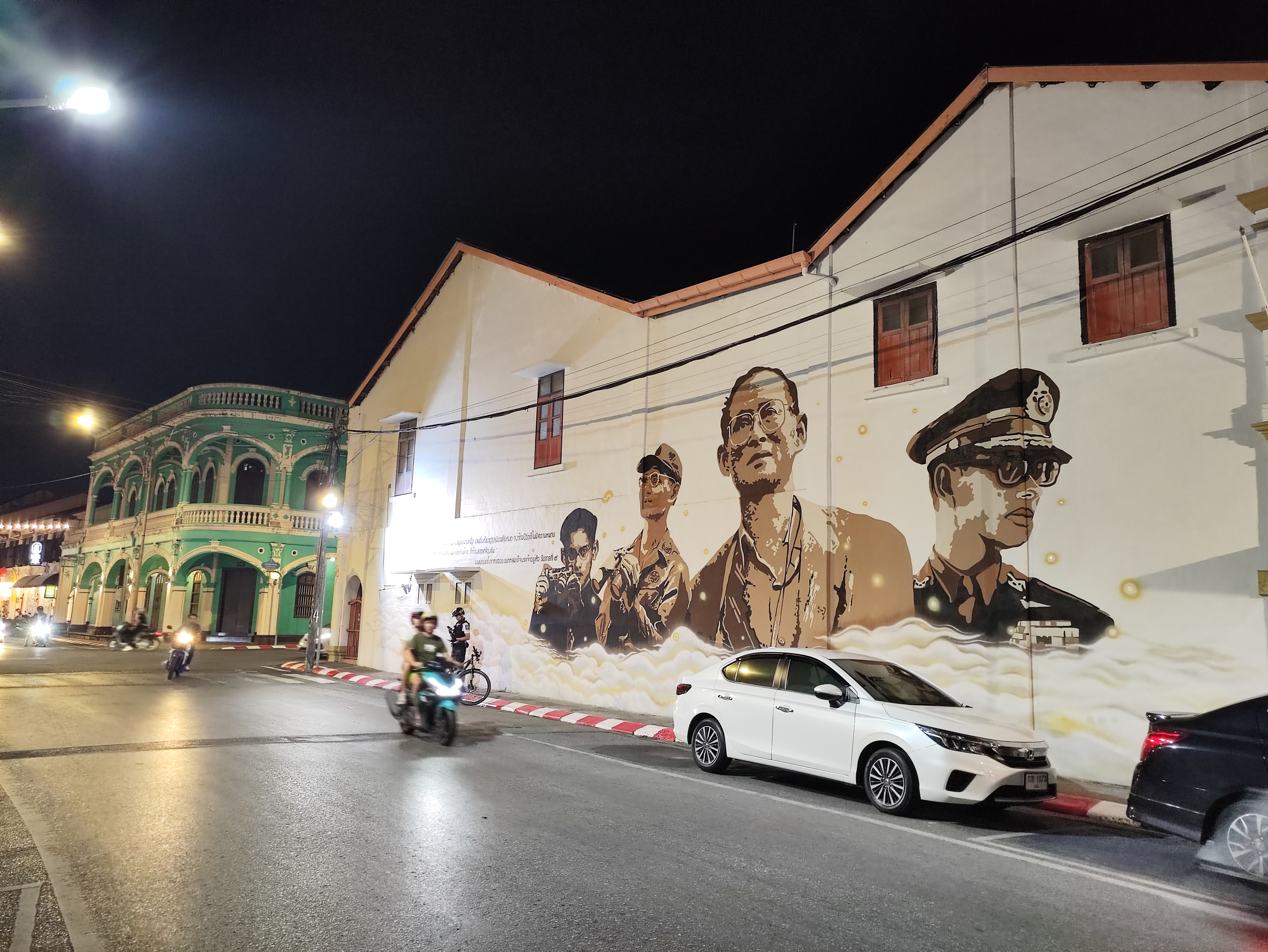
Mural of King Rama 9 on the Dibuk Road – Phuket

On 26 December 2004, Phuket, along with other areas on Thailand's west coast, experienced significant devastation due to a tsunami triggered by an earthquake off the coast of Sumatra, Indonesia. This natural disaster had far-reaching impacts, resulting in approximately 5,300 fatalities in Thailand and causing extensive damage and loss of life across South and Southeast Asia, totaling around two hundred thousand deaths. In Phuket, around 250 individuals, including foreign tourists, were reported deceased. Major beaches on Phuket's west coast, including Kamala, Patong, Karon, and Kata, suffered substantial damage, as did some resorts and communities along the island's southern shores. Notably, the Takua Pa District in Phang Nga province, north of Phuket, was among Thailand's most severely affected areas, with significant casualties, including a considerable number of Burmese laborers. In response to the tsunami disaster, Thailand initiated the installation of a series of tsunami-detection buoys in December 2006. These buoys, part of a regional warning system in the Indian Ocean, are located approximately 1,000 km (620 mi) offshore, positioned between Thailand and Sri Lanka.

In early 2020, the COVID-19 pandemic reached Phuket. By March of that year, Phuket and other regions in Southern Thailand implemented lockdown measures, including stay-at-home orders, a mandate for mask-wearing, and social distancing protocols. While these measures were relatively effective in controlling the spread of the virus, they had a significant impact on Phuket's tourism-dependent economy. By 2022, Thailand transitioned towards the post-pandemic phase, marking the end of the country's intensive COVID-19 response measures.

The murder of Nicole Sauvain-Weisskopf, a Swiss national on holiday, occurred in Phuket in August 2021.

== Symbols ==
The provincial slogan is "Pearl of the Andaman. Heavenly City of the South. Golden beaches. Two heroines. Virtue of Luang Pho Chaem." The provincial seal and flag show the monument of the heroic sisters Thao Thep Krasattri and Thao Si Sunthon.

The provincial tree is Pterocarpus indicus, and the provincial flower is Bougainvillea sp. Phuket is an important pearl cultivation area and is also nicknamed Pearl of the Andaman. The pearl oyster Pinctada maxima is the provincial aquatic animal.

== Geography ==
Phuket
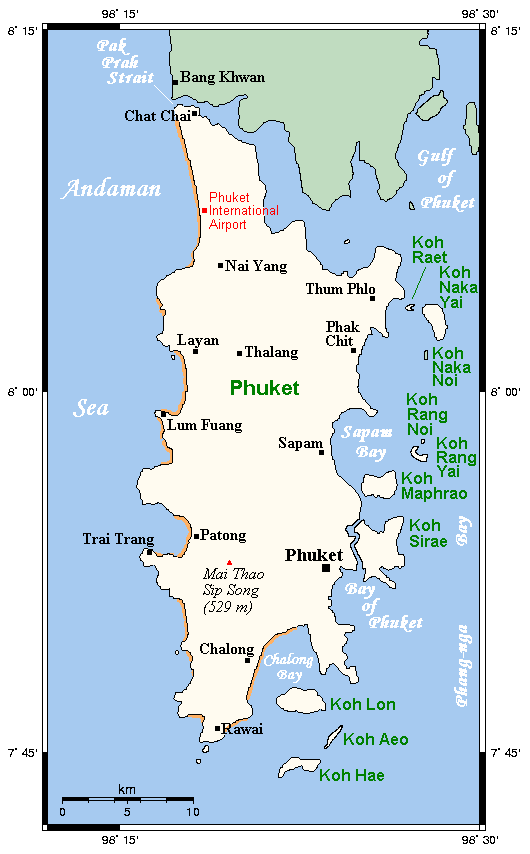
- Map of Phuket (beaches in brown)
- Interactive map of Phuket

Geography
- Location: Andaman Sea (West); Strait of Malacca (East)
- Coordinates: 7°53′24″N 98°23′54″E
- Area: 576 km^{2} (222 sq mi)
- Length: 50 km (31 mi)
- Width: 20 km (12 mi)
- Highest elevation: 529 m (1736 ft)
- Highest point: Khao Mai Thao Sip Song

Administration
- Thailand
- Province: Phuket
- District: Thalang (North); Kathu (West); Mueang Phuket (Southeast)

Demographics
- Population: 386,605 (2015)
- Pop. density: 1,042/km^{2} (2699/sq mi)

Phuket Island (Ko Phuket), the largest island in Thailand, is situated in the southern part of the country, within the Andaman Sea. The island is characterized by its mountainous terrain, with a mountain range extending from the north to the south along its western side. This range is part of the larger Phuket mountain range, which spans approximately 440 km (270 mi) from the Kra Isthmus.

The island's highest point is traditionally cited as Khao Mai Thao Sip Song, with an altitude of 529 m (1,736 ft) above sea level. However, there are reports suggesting the presence of an unnamed peak in the Kamala Hills, behind Kathu Waterfall, which may reach an elevation of 542 meters above sea level.

As per the 2000 census, Phuket's population was 249,446, which increased to 525,709 by the 2010 census. This marked the highest growth rate of all provinces in Thailand, averaging 7.4 percent annually. The current population of Phuket is estimated to be around 600,000, comprising a diverse mix of migrants, international expatriates, Thais registered in other provinces, and local inhabitants. However, the official registered population, which counts only those included in a thabian ban or house registration book, was reported as 360,905 at the end of 2012. This figure does not encompass all residents, as many are not registered in the house registration system. In October 2025, Phuket MP Chalermpong Sangdee told Parliament that Phuket's current resident population is estimated to be around 2,000,000 people.

Phuket Island, situated approximately 863 kilometres (536 mi) south of Bangkok, spans an area of 543 square kilometres (210 sq mi), not accounting for its smaller islets. It is accompanied by several other islands including Ko Lone (4.77 square kilometres (1.84 sq mi)), Ko Maprao (3.7 square kilometres (1.4 sq mi)), Ko Naka Yai (2.08 square kilometres (0.80 sq mi)), Ko Racha Noi (3.06 square kilometres (1.18 sq mi)), Ko Racha Yai (4.5 square kilometres (1.7 sq mi)), and Ko Sire, the second largest, covering 8.8 square kilometres (3.4 sq mi).

The island measures 48 kilometres (30 mi) in length from north to south, and its width extends to 21 kilometres (13 mi). Around 60% of Phuket Island is covered with forests, rubber, and palm oil plantations. Its west coast is adorned with several sandy beaches, while the east coast features predominantly muddy beaches. The southernmost tip of the island is marked by Laem Phromthep (Thai: แหลมพรหมเทพ "Brahma's Cape"), known for being a popular viewpoint.

In the northern, more mountainous part of the island, the Khao Phra Thaeo No-Hunting Area spans over 20 km^{2} (7.7 mi^{2}), dedicated to preserving rainforest ecosystems. This reserve's three highest peaks include Khao Prathiu (384 metres (1,260 ft)), Khao Bang Pae (388 metres (1,273 ft)), and Khao Phara (422 metres (1,385 ft)). Additionally, the Sirinat National Park on the northwest coast, established in 1981, encompasses an area of 90 km^{2} (35 mi^{2}), including 68 km^{2} (26 mi^{2}) of marine area. This park is significant for encompassing the Nai Yang Beach, a nesting site for sea turtles. The total forested area of Phuket is approximately 113 km^{2} (44 sq mi), accounting for 20.6 percent of the province's total area.

Location protected areas of Phuket
Phuket protected areas: / National park; 1 / Sirinat; / Non-hunting area; 2 / Khao Phra Thaeo

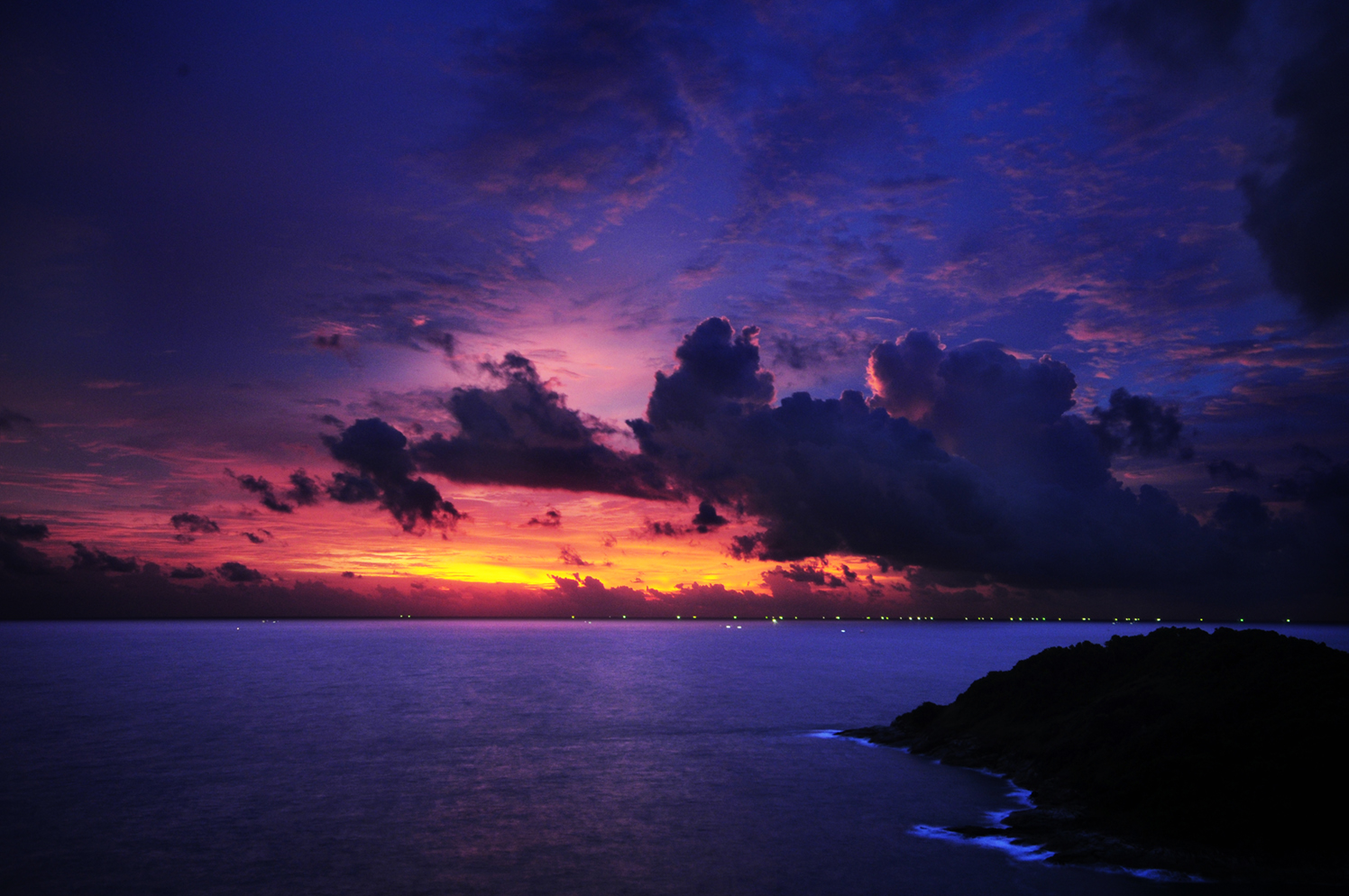
Patong Beach is the most popular and well-developed beach on Phuket Island

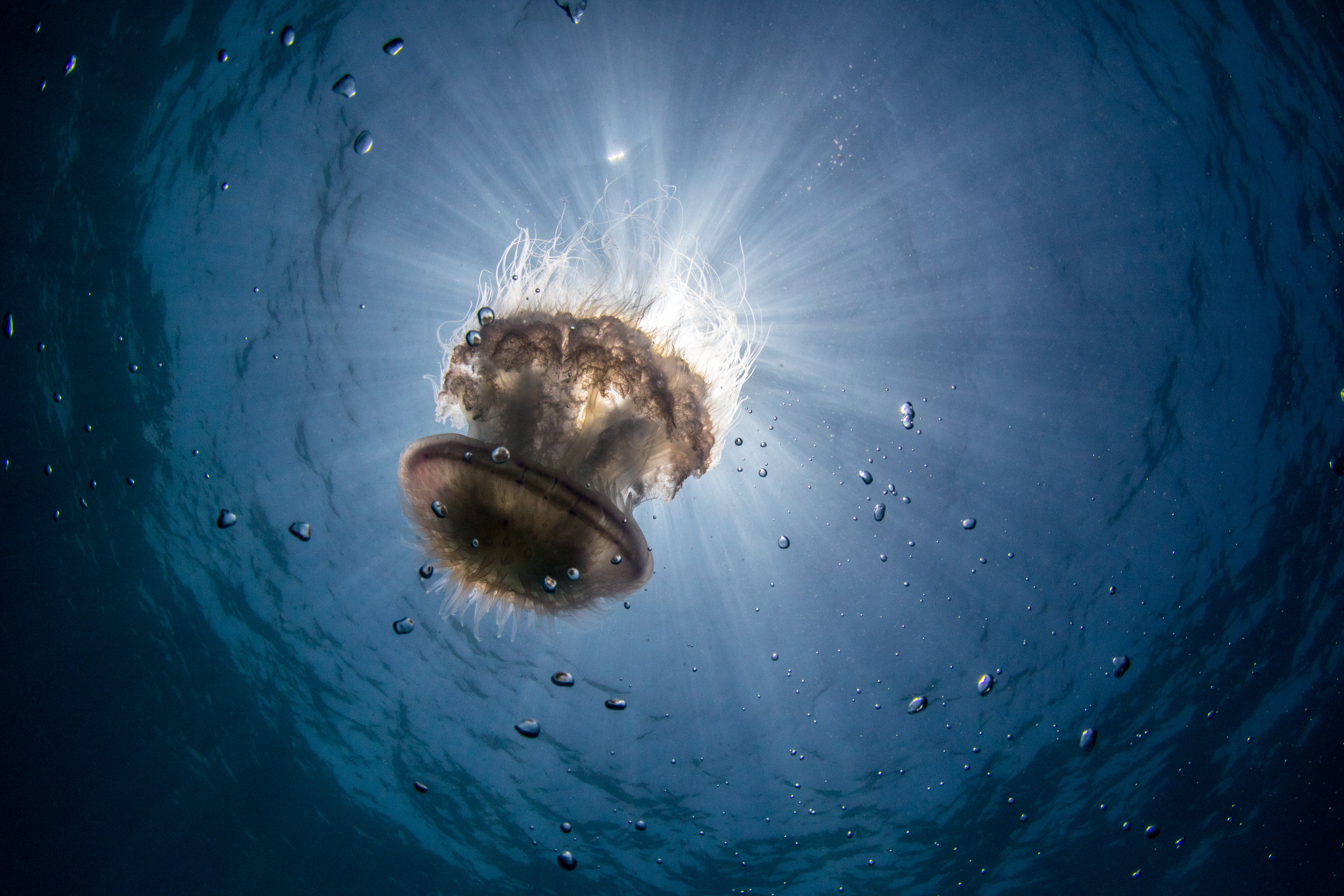
Jellyfish at Phuket

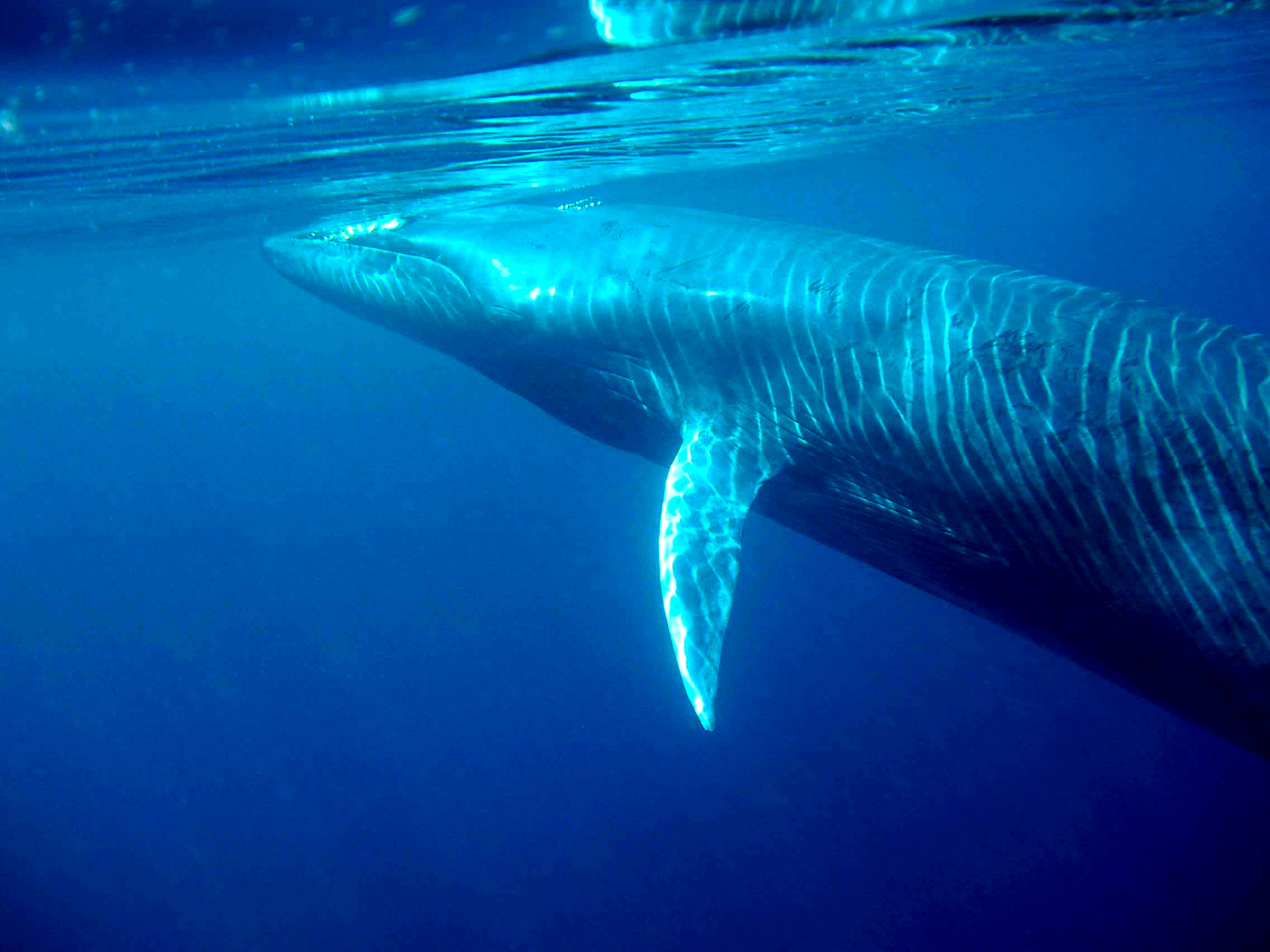
Bryde's whale swims off the Islands

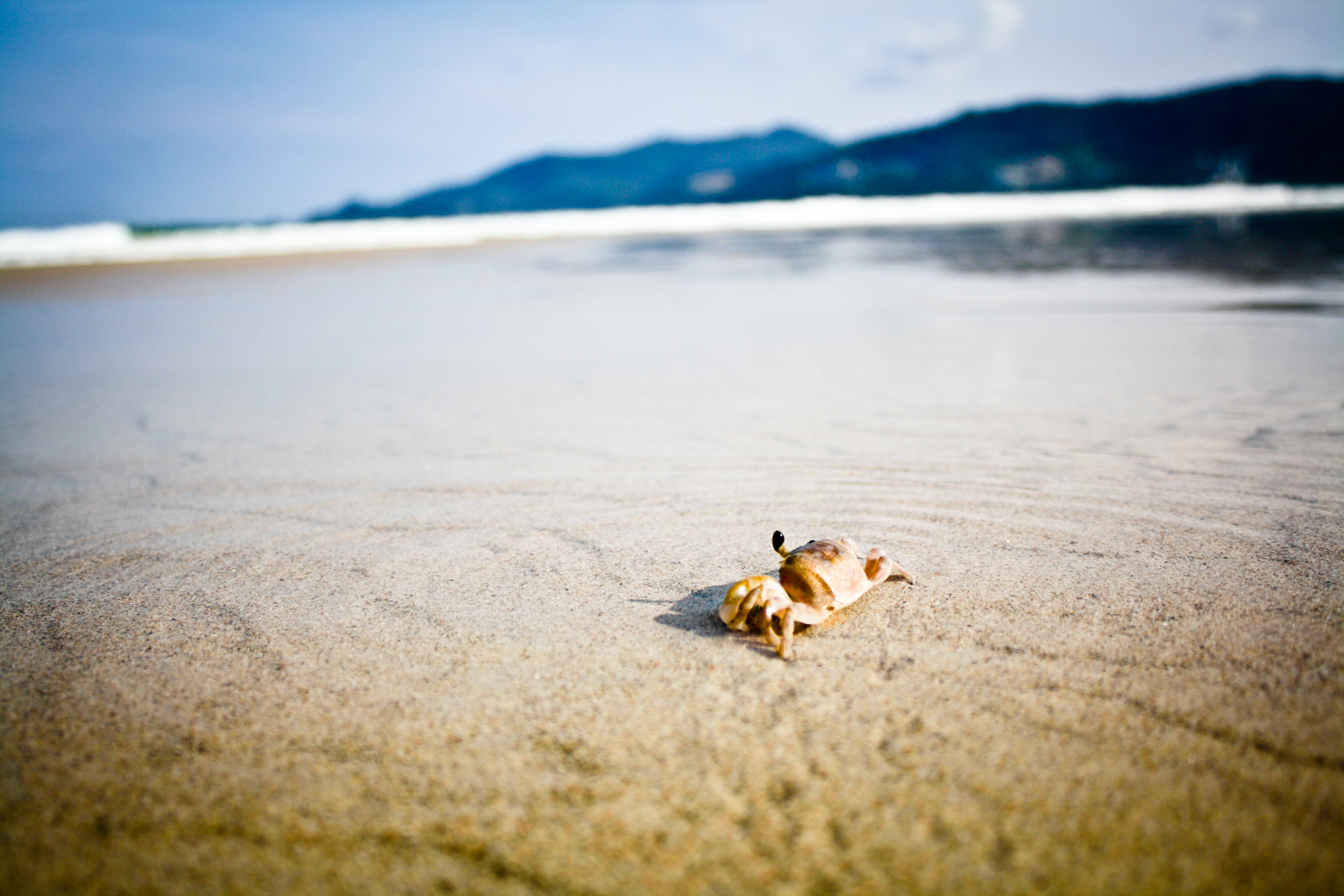
Small crab on the sand beach at Phuket

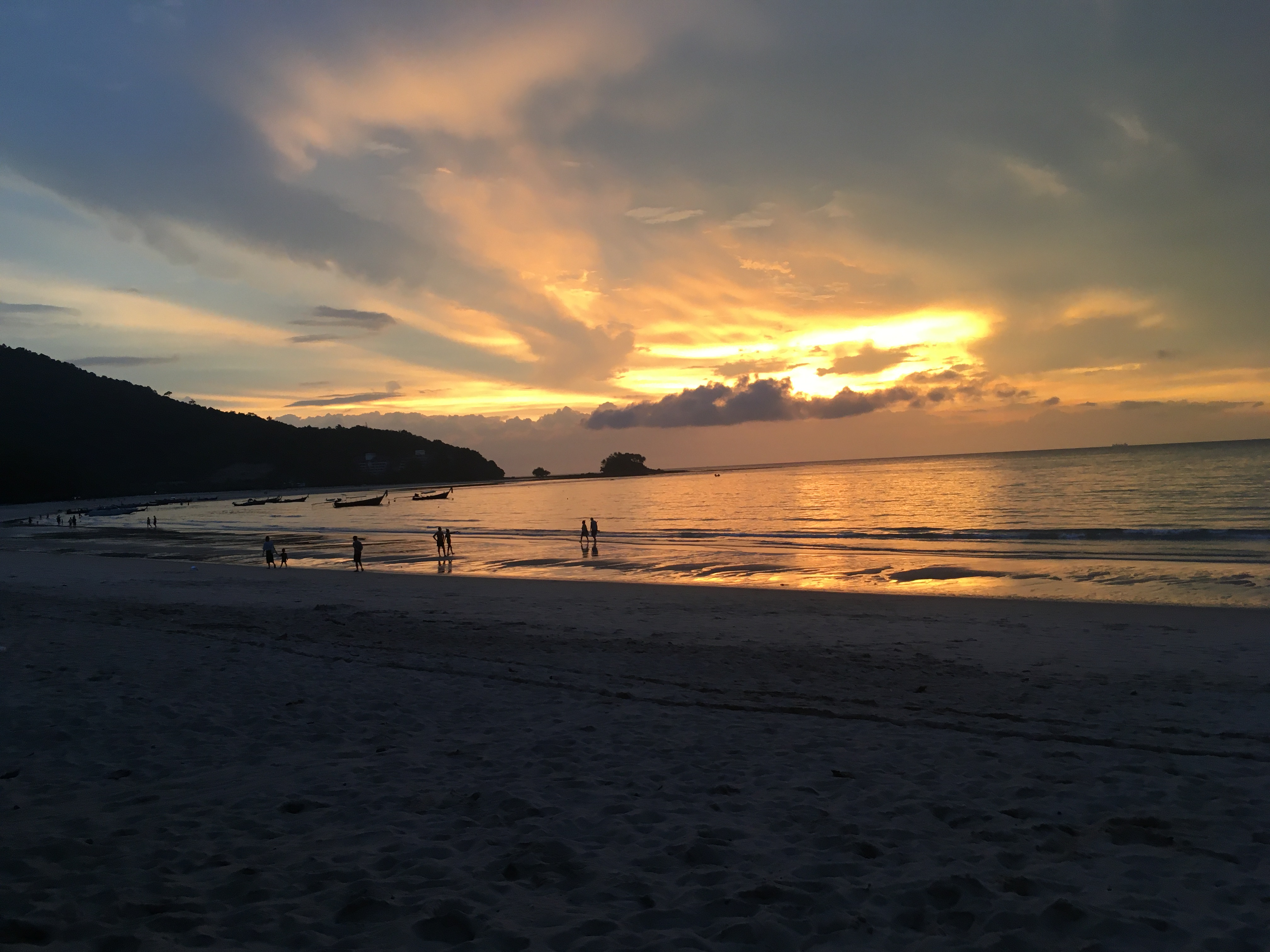
Sunset on Nai Yang beach, northern Phuket

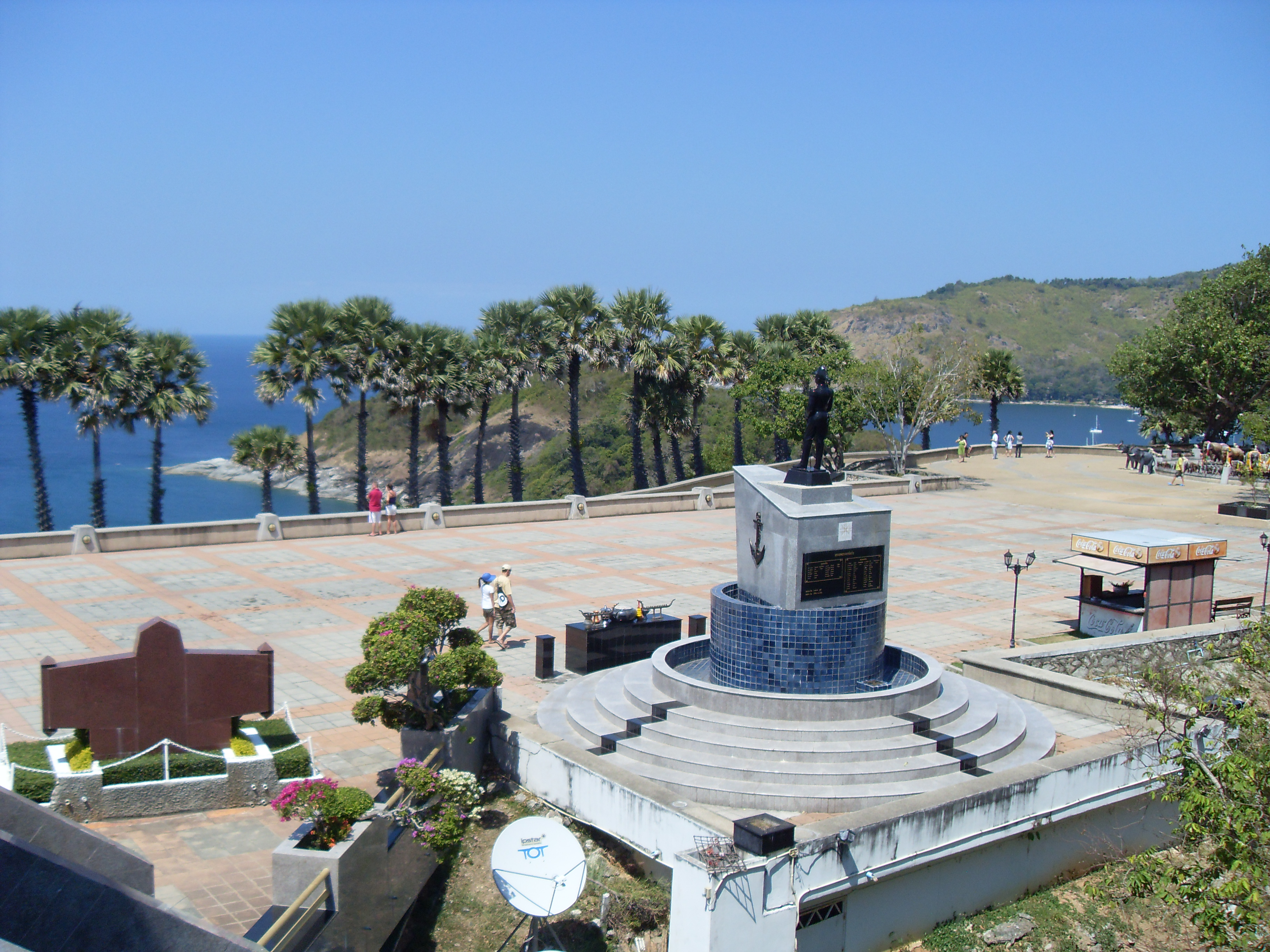
View from Krom Luang Chumpon monument

=== Climate ===
Phuket, characterized by a tropical monsoon climate under the Köppen climate classification, experiences relatively uniform temperatures throughout the year due to its equatorial location. The region typically observes an average annual high temperature around 32 °C (90 °F) and an average annual low around 25 °C (77 °F). The climate of Phuket is divided into two distinct seasons: a dry season extending from December through March, and a wet season that spans the remaining eight months. Notably, even during the dry season, Phuket is subject to occasional rainfall. On average, the city receives approximately 2,200 millimetres (87 in) of rainfall annually.

Climate data for Phuket (Mueang Phuket district) (1981–2010)
Month	Jan	Feb	Mar	Apr	May	Jun	Jul	Aug	Sep	Oct	Nov	Dec	Year
Record high °C (°F)	36.3 (97.3)	36.7 (98.1)	37.8 (100.0)	37.8 (100.0)	37.8 (100.0)	35.8 (96.4)	35.0 (95.0)	35.5 (95.9)	35.0 (95.0)	35.3 (95.5)	34.8 (94.6)	34.2 (93.6)	37.8 (100.0)
Mean daily maximum °C (°F)	32.7 (90.9)	33.6 (92.5)	34.0 (93.2)	33.9 (93.0)	32.8 (91.0)	32.4 (90.3)	32.0 (89.6)	32.0 (89.6)	31.5 (88.7)	31.5 (88.7)	31.7 (89.1)	31.7 (89.1)	32.5 (90.5)
Daily mean °C (°F)	28.1 (82.6)	28.7 (83.7)	29.2 (84.6)	29.4 (84.9)	28.8 (83.8)	28.6 (83.5)	28.2 (82.8)	28.1 (82.6)	27.5 (81.5)	27.4 (81.3)	27.7 (81.9)	27.6 (81.7)	28.3 (82.9)
Mean daily minimum °C (°F)	24.5 (76.1)	24.9 (76.8)	25.4 (77.7)	25.8 (78.4)	25.6 (78.1)	25.5 (77.9)	25.1 (77.2)	25.3 (77.5)	24.6 (76.3)	24.5 (76.1)	24.7 (76.5)	24.4 (75.9)	25.0 (77.0)
Record low °C (°F)	19.5 (67.1)	18.6 (65.5)	20.0 (68.0)	20.5 (68.9)	21.2 (70.2)	21.9 (71.4)	20.5 (68.9)	21.1 (70.0)	21.1 (70.0)	20.5 (68.9)	20.3 (68.5)	18.4 (65.1)	18.4 (65.1)
Average rainfall mm (inches)	30.3 (1.19)	23.9 (0.94)	73.5 (2.89)	142.9 (5.63)	259.5 (10.22)	213.3 (8.40)	258.2 (10.17)	286.8 (11.29)	361.2 (14.22)	320.1 (12.60)	177.4 (6.98)	72.4 (2.85)	2,219.5 (87.38)
Average rainy days	4.6	3.1	6.7	11.8	18.8	18.2	19.6	19.0	22.1	22.5	15.4	9.3	171.1
Average relative humidity (%)	70	69	71	75	79	79	79	79	82	82	79	75	77
Mean monthly sunshine hours	235.6	214.7	204.6	183.0	151.9	150.0	151.9	151.9	108.0	145.7	174.0	198.4	2,069.7
Mean daily sunshine hours	7.6	7.6	6.6	6.1	4.9	5.0	4.9	4.9	3.6	4.7	5.8	6.4	5.7
Source 1: Thai Meteorological Department
Source 2: Office of Water Management and Hydrology, Royal Irrigation Department (sun and humidity)

Climate data for Phuket (Phuket International Airport) (1981–2010)
Month	Jan	Feb	Mar	Apr	May	Jun	Jul	Aug	Sep	Oct	Nov	Dec	Year
Record high °C (°F)	35.5 (95.9)	38.5 (101.3)	37.5 (99.5)	37.6 (99.7)	37.7 (99.9)	35.0 (95.0)	34.2 (93.6)	34.8 (94.6)	34.4 (93.9)	33.9 (93.0)	36.1 (97.0)	33.5 (92.3)	38.5 (101.3)
Mean daily maximum °C (°F)	32.1 (89.8)	33.1 (91.6)	33.6 (92.5)	33.4 (92.1)	32.2 (90.0)	31.7 (89.1)	31.3 (88.3)	31.2 (88.2)	30.7 (87.3)	30.8 (87.4)	31.1 (88.0)	31.2 (88.2)	31.9 (89.4)
Daily mean °C (°F)	27.0 (80.6)	27.7 (81.9)	28.3 (82.9)	28.6 (83.5)	28.4 (83.1)	28.3 (82.9)	27.9 (82.2)	28.0 (82.4)	27.3 (81.1)	27.0 (80.6)	26.9 (80.4)	26.7 (80.1)	27.7 (81.9)
Mean daily minimum °C (°F)	22.6 (72.7)	22.8 (73.0)	23.4 (74.1)	24.2 (75.6)	24.7 (76.5)	24.9 (76.8)	24.6 (76.3)	24.9 (76.8)	24.2 (75.6)	23.8 (74.8)	23.5 (74.3)	22.9 (73.2)	23.9 (75.0)
Record low °C (°F)	17.9 (64.2)	17.1 (62.8)	18.5 (65.3)	20.2 (68.4)	19.5 (67.1)	19.6 (67.3)	20.2 (68.4)	18.9 (66.0)	19.0 (66.2)	20.8 (69.4)	17.0 (62.6)	18.9 (66.0)	17.0 (62.6)
Average rainfall mm (inches)	36.2 (1.43)	27.2 (1.07)	100.3 (3.95)	154.0 (6.06)	281.5 (11.08)	256.8 (10.11)	261.5 (10.30)	329.8 (12.98)	399.1 (15.71)	353.4 (13.91)	207.8 (8.18)	67.4 (2.65)	2,475 (97.43)
Average rainy days	6.2	4.1	7.9	12.9	20.2	18.9	20.3	20.2	22.8	23.3	16.6	10.0	183.4
Average relative humidity (%)	76	74	76	80	82	82	82	82	84	86	83	79	81
Mean monthly sunshine hours	198.4	180.8	201.5	183.0	155.0	150.0	155.0	114.7	108.0	108.5	138.0	179.8	1,872.7
Mean daily sunshine hours	6.4	6.4	6.5	6.1	5.0	5.0	5.0	3.7	3.6	3.5	4.6	5.8	5.1
Source 1: Thai Meteorological Department
Source 2: Office of Water Management and Hydrology, Royal Irrigation Department (sun and humidity)

== Demographics ==
In Thailand, Buddhism is the predominant religion, with a notable presence in Phuket. Approximately 20% of Phuket's population adheres to Islam, primarily descendants of the island's original Austronesian inhabitants. This Muslim community includes a substantial number of individuals of Malay descent. The ethnic composition of Phuket also includes a significant proportion of people of Chinese ancestry, many descendants of tin miners who migrated to the island during the 19th century. The Peranakan community, locally referred to as "Phuket Babas", forms a distinct part of this Chinese demographic, with historical links to the Peranakans of Penang and Malacca.

According to the preliminary results of the 2010 census, Phuket had a population of 525,018, including approximately 115,881 expatriates, accounting for 21.1% of the total population. However, these figures may not be entirely accurate, as the Phuket Provincial Employment Office has recorded over 64,000 legally residing workers from Burma (Myanmar), Laos, and Cambodia, suggesting a higher actual population. The Thai census of 2015 reported a population of 386,605 for Phuket.

During peak tourist seasons, Phuket experiences a significant influx of visitors, with the population increasing to over one million. Tourists, predominantly from Western Europe, China, Russia, and the United States, are drawn to the island around Christmas, contributing to this seasonal population increase.

=== Religion ===
Religion in Phuket (2017)
1. Buddhism (68.6%)
2. Islam (26.6%)
3. Christianity (0.98%)
4. Other (3.76%)

== Administrative divisions ==
=== Provincial government ===
Phuket is divided into three districts (amphoe), which are further divided into 17 subdistricts (tambon), and 103 villages (muban).

No.	Name	Thai	Malay
1.	Mueang Phuket	เมืองภูเก็ต	Bukit
2.	Kathu	กะทู้	Pantai Berbatu
3.	Thalang	ถลาง	Telong

=== Local government ===
As of 26 November 2019 there are: one Phuket Provincial Administration Organisation (ongkan borihan suan changwat) and 12 municipal (thesaban) areas in the province. Phuket has city (thesaban nakhon) status. Kathu and Patong have town (thesaban mueang) status. Further 9 subdistrict municipalities (thesaban tambon). The non-municipal areas are administered by six Subdistrict Administrative Organisations (SAO; ongkan borihan suan tambon).

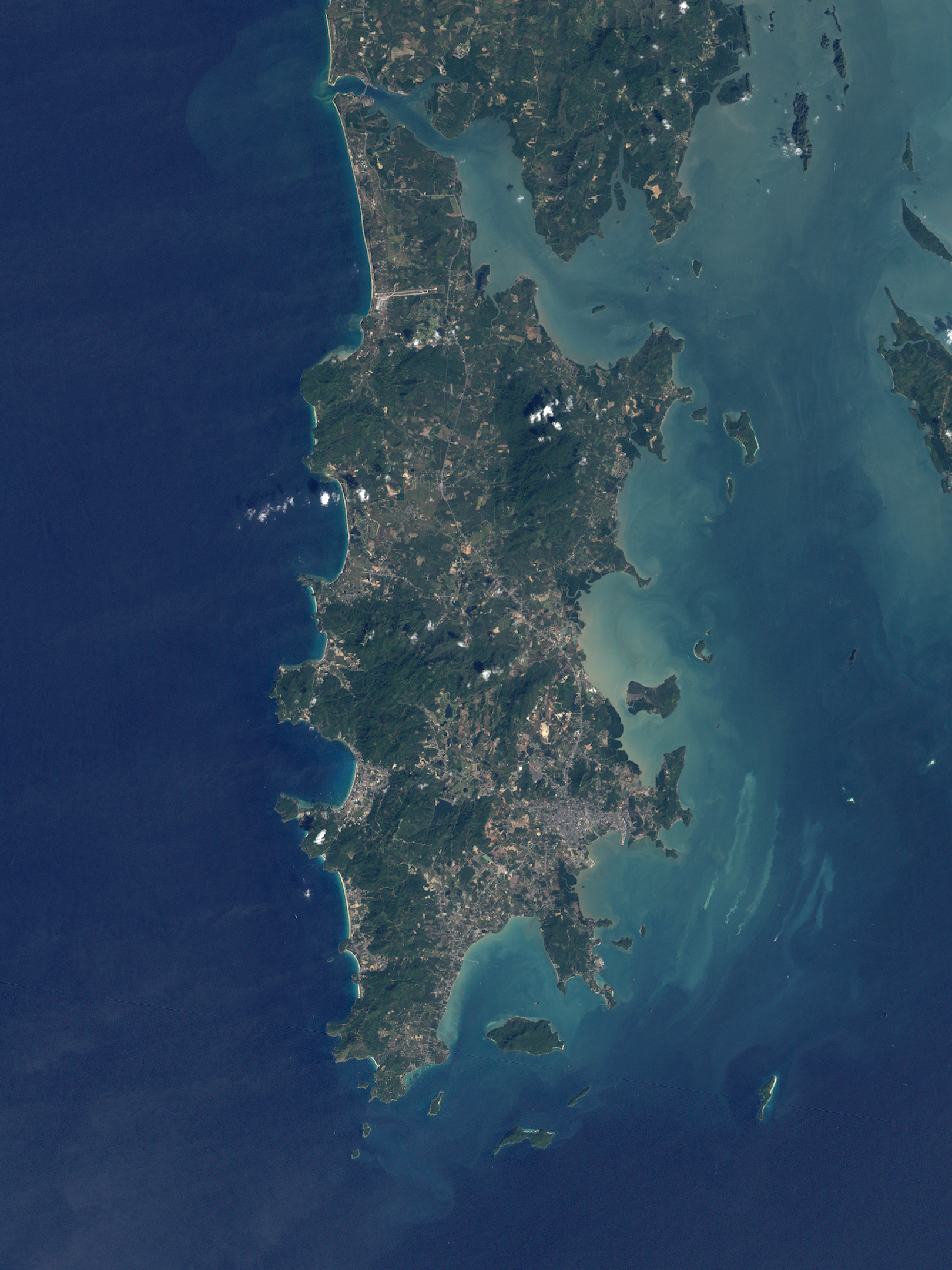
Satellite photo, Dec 2000

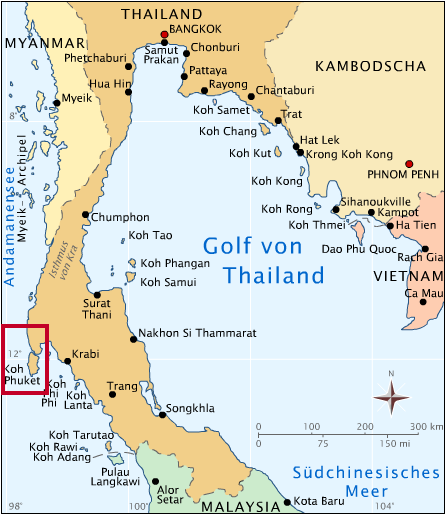

== Economy ==
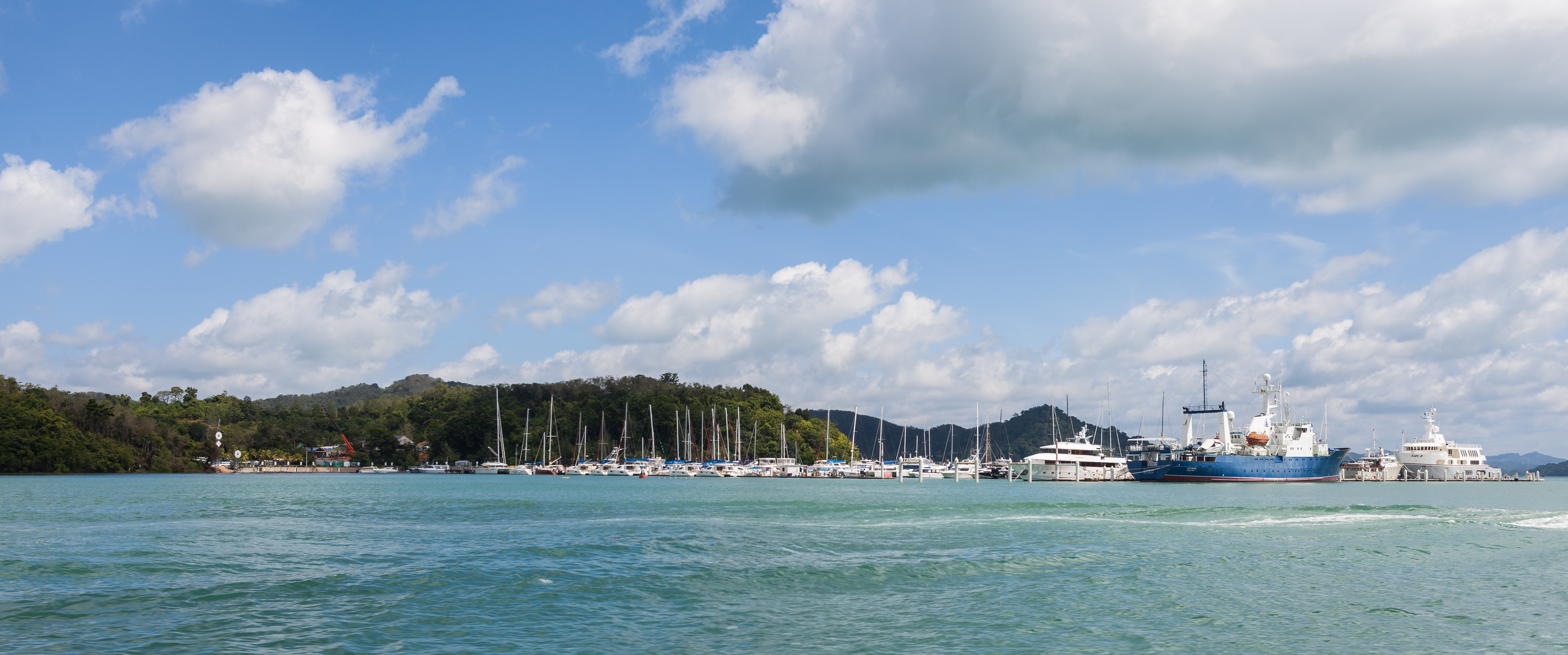
Ao Por port in Phuket

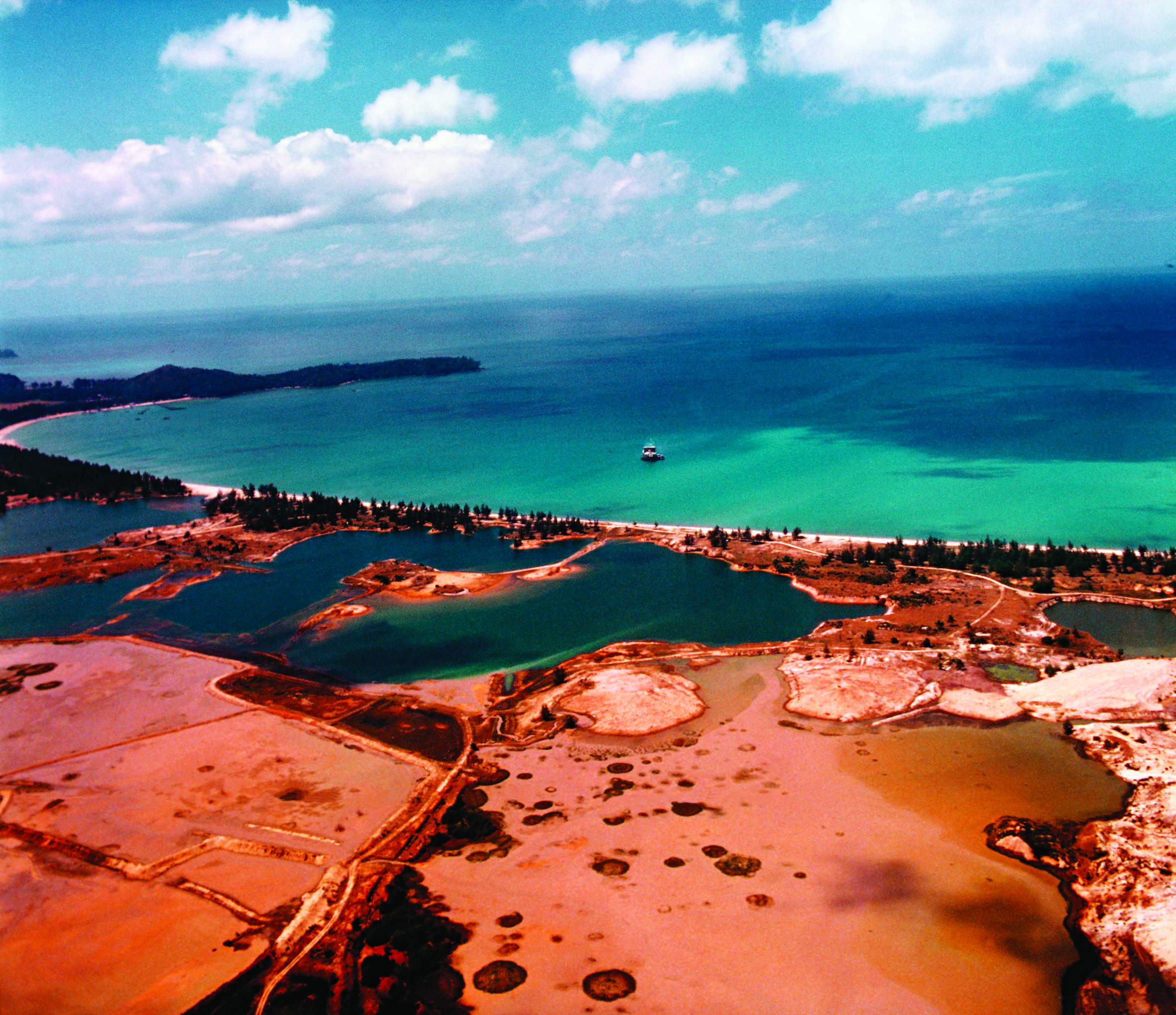
Andaman Sea

Tin mining played a pivotal role in the economy of Phuket from the 16th century until its decline in the 20th century. Today, the economy of Phuket is primarily supported by two sectors: rubber tree plantations, contributing significantly to Thailand's status as the world's leading rubber producer, and tourism.

The development of Phuket's tourism sector began in earnest in the 1980s, with the west coast beaches, notably Patong, Karon, and Kata, emerging as key destinations. Following the 2004 tsunami, efforts were made to restore all affected buildings and attractions. The island has since undergone extensive development, evidenced by the construction of new hotels, apartments, and houses.

Phuket is also a major hub for luxury yacht sales and charter in Southeast Asia, with several international yacht brokerages operating from the island's marinas along the Andaman coast.

In a 2005 report by Fortune, Phuket was listed among the top five global retirement destinations. The island's appeal as a retirement location is attributed to various factors, including its climate, lifestyle, and amenities.

The year 2017 marked a significant influx of tourists to Phuket, with the island welcoming approximately 10 million visitors, predominantly from overseas. China was noted as the primary source of these foreign tourists. Tourism in Phuket played a crucial role in Thailand's economy, generating about 385 billion baht in revenue, nearly 14% of the nation's total earnings of 2.77 trillion baht in that year, representing approximately 80% of the province's GDP.

In the first half of 2019, Phuket experienced a decrease in tourist arrivals, which impacted the local hospitality industry. This trend was marked by reduced hotel occupancy rates and intensified price competition among accommodations. Consequently, there was a noted decrease in revenue per available room (RevPAR). Analysts attribute this downturn to a combination of fewer tourists and an oversupply of hotel rooms. However, despite the decline in tourist numbers, the Tourism Authority of Thailand (TAT) reported a 3.1% increase in tourism revenues for the same period.

Estimates of the total number of hotel rooms in Phuket vary. According to Oxfam, Phuket has approximately 60,000 hotel rooms to cater to its 9.1 million annual visitors. Contrasting figures were presented in reports by the Bangkok Post in September 2019. One report indicated that Phuket has around 600 hotels comprising 40,000 rooms. A separate report from three weeks earlier estimated 93,941 available hotel rooms, excluding villas and hostels, with an expectation of an additional 15,000 rooms by 2024. These varying figures highlight the difficulty in accurately quantifying the total number of hotel accommodations in the region.

In 2023, Phuket experienced a 15% increase in property prices with demand driven by an influx of Russian and Ukrainian nationals. The number of luxury villas launched in Phuket during the first six months of 2023 surged 12 times to 541 units worth a total 29.6 billion baht, from 45 units valued at 886 million baht the previous year.

Notably, 60% of property transactions are driven by foreign owners driving economic activity but simultaneously pressuring locals out of key urban hubs.

As Thailand moves to legalize gambling, Phuket is expected to be one of the locations of an integrated resort.

== Transportation ==
Air

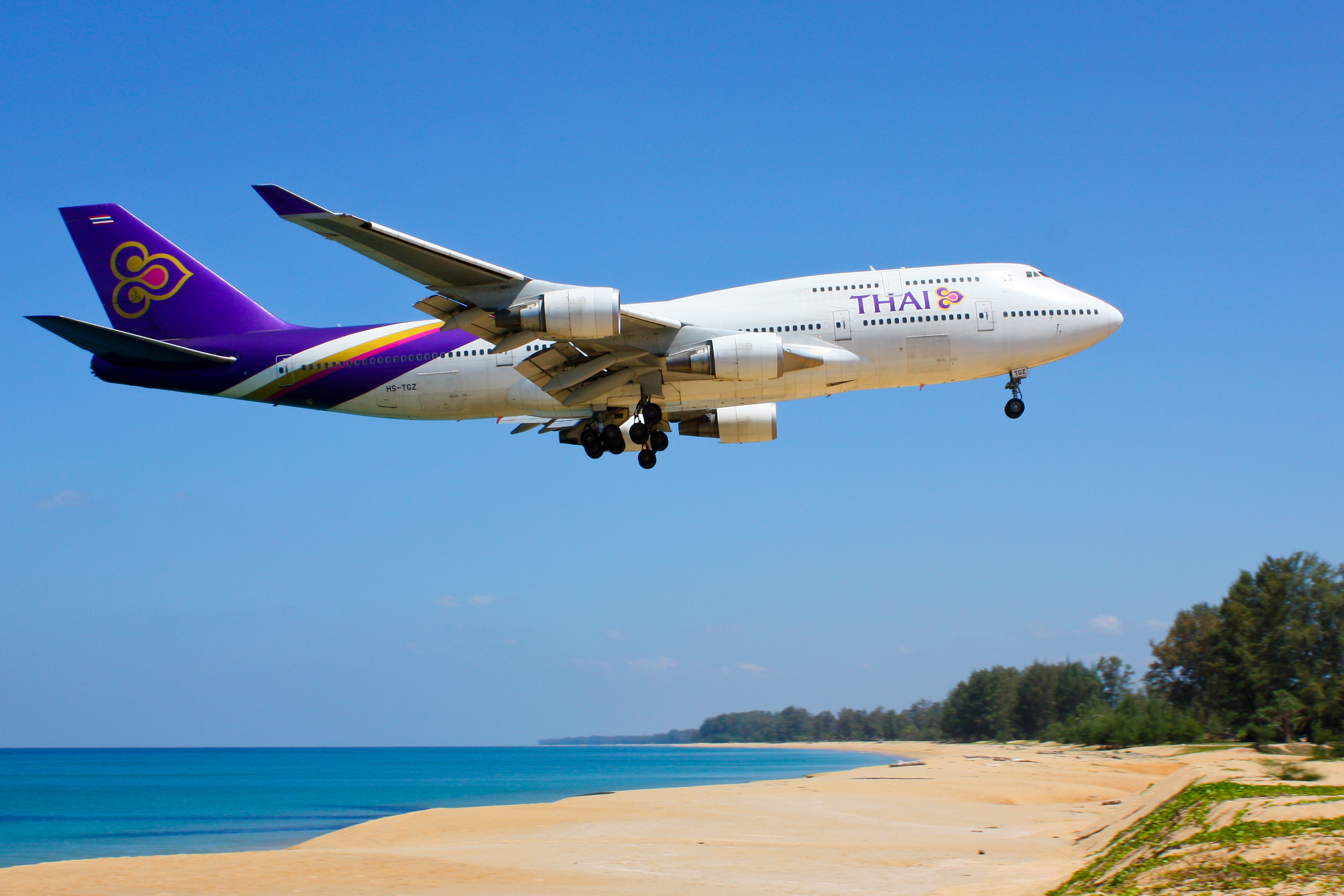
Plane spotting at Mai Khao Beach in Phuket

Phuket International Airport (HKT) initiated an expansion project in September 2012, with an allocated budget of 5.7 billion baht (approximately US$185.7 million). This expansion, which was scheduled for completion by 14 February 2016, aimed to increase the airport's annual passenger handling capacity from 6.5 million to 12.5 million and included the construction of a new international terminal. The airport has regular flights to Bangkok, towns of southern Thailand, and George Town, Malaysia.

Rail

Phuket does not have a direct rail link. The nearest train stations are in Surat Thani and Khiri Rat Nikhom, approximately 230 km (140 mi) away.

City transit

Songthaews provide an economical means of transport between towns and various beaches. There are also conventional bus services, and motorcycle taxis are numerous in the main town and the Patong Beach area. Traditional tuk-tuks have largely been replaced by small vans, predominantly red, with some in yellow or green. Taxi services in Phuket generally operate with fixed rates. For travel from the airport to Phuket Town and major beaches, privately operated buses are available. Additionally, the ride-share service Grab is frequently recommended by locals as a convenient transportation option.

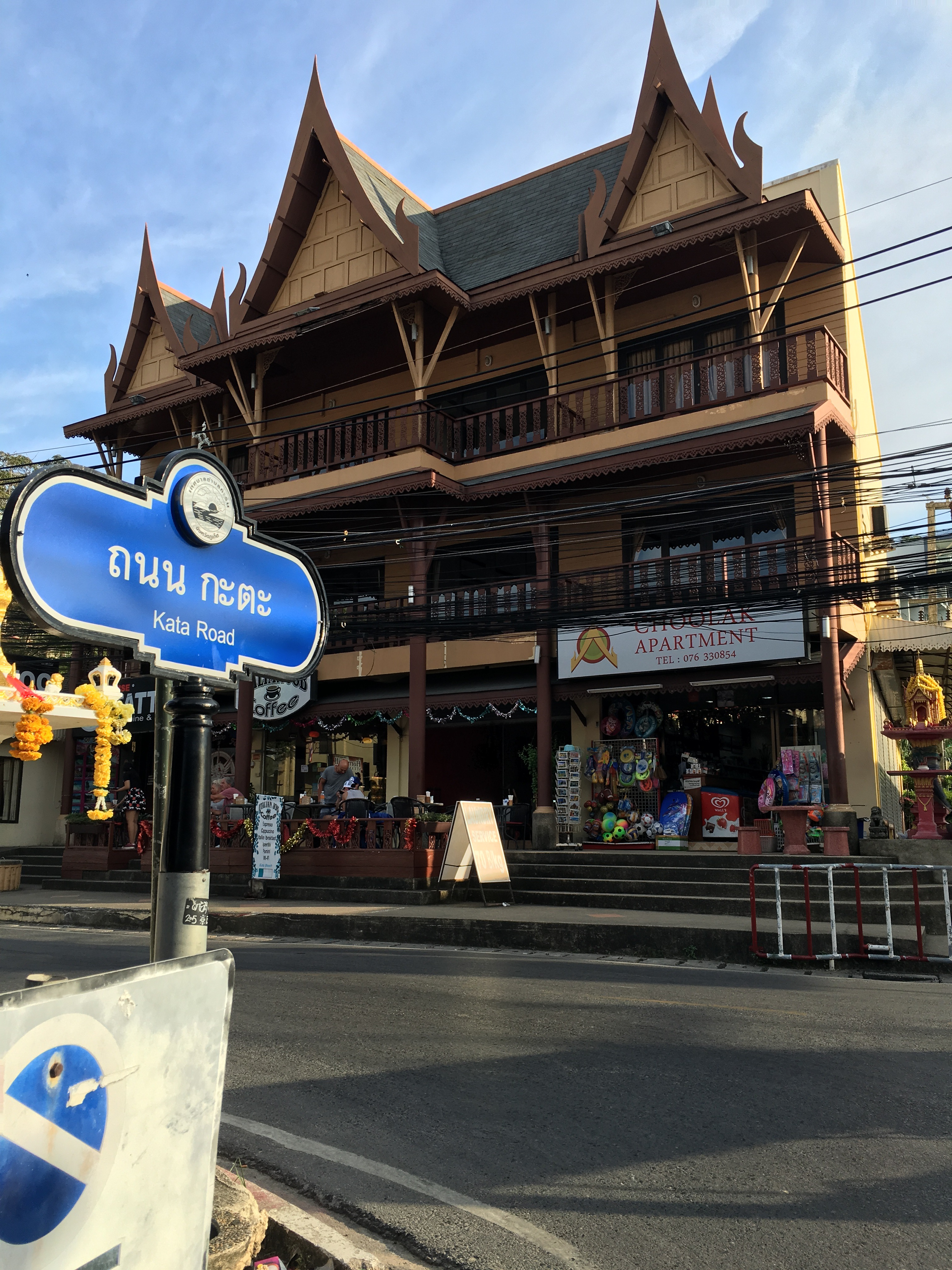
Kata Road

Bus

Phuket's Bus Station 2 BKS Terminal serves as the main link for transportation to and from Bangkok, as well as other major cities and provinces in Thailand, and is approximately four kilometres north of Phuket's town center and port area. It provides connections to various local transport options, including tuk-tuks, metered taxis, motorcycle taxis, songthaews, and local buses, facilitating access to the island's numerous beaches and resorts. Daily scheduled bus services by private and government companies originate from Bangkok's Mo Chit and Southern Terminal stations.

Tram

In 2018, the Mass Rapid Transit Authority of Thailand (MRTA) announced plans for the development of a tram network in Phuket, with bidding set to begin in 2020. This project, estimated at 39 billion baht, forms part of the government's private-public-partnership (PPP) initiative, aimed at accelerating its implementation. The proposed tram network, spanning approximately 60 km (37 mi) with 23 stations, is designed to extend from Takua Thung District in Phang Nga province to Chalong in Phuket. The initial phase of the project plans to connect Phuket International Airport with Chalong, covering a distance of around 40 km (25 mi), with a projected completion timeline of three years.

Ferry

Ferry services serve neighboring islands, such as Phi Phi and Koh Lanta. They operate daily from Rassada Pier and Tonsai Pier.

== Health ==
Phuket has six hospitals. The main hospital, operated by the Ministry of Public Health, is Vachira Phuket Hospital, with smaller hospitals at Thalang and Patong. There are also three private hospitals: Phuket International Hospital, Bangkok Hospital Phuket, and Mission Hospital Phuket.

== Human achievement index 2022 ==
Health	Education	Employment	Income
7	10	63	36
Housing	Family	Transport	Participation
69	52	5	74
Province Phuket, with an HAI 2022 value of 0.6399, is "average" and occupies 41 place in rankings.

Since 2003, the United Nations Development Programme (UNDP) in Thailand has tracked progress on human development at the sub-national level using the Human Achievement Index (HAI), a composite index covering all the eight key areas of human development. The National Economic and Social Development Board (NESDB) has taken over this task since 2017.

Rank	Classification
1—13	"high"
14—29	"somewhat high"
30—45	"average"
46—61	"somewhat low"
62—77	"low"

Map with provinces and HAI 2022 rankings

== Sports ==
Phuket F.C., also known as The Southern Sea Kirins, was established in 2009 and subsequently joined the Regional League South Division. The team designated Surakul Stadium as their home ground for matches. Sirirak Konthong took the helm as the inaugural coach of the team. In their formative year, Phuket F.C. demonstrated significant progress in the league.

The 2010 season marked a notable achievement for Phuket F.C., as the team clinched the title in the Southern Regional Division 2. Despite a loss to Buriram FC in the final, Phuket F.C. secured second place in the Division 2 Champions League. This performance facilitated their promotion to the Thai Division 1 League for the 2011 season.

In 2017, Phuket F.C. was officially dissolved. This decision was influenced by financial difficulties, particularly issues surrounding the termination of contracts.

The following year, in 2018, Phuket F.C. underwent significant changes. The club merged with Banbueng F.C., a move that resulted in a substantial reorganization. By 2019, this merged entity adopted the name Phuket City. However, this renaming was short-lived. Subsequent changes in the club's management, particularly a takeover by the board members of Banbueng F.C., led to a reversion to the name Banbueng F.C. Along with this change in nomenclature, the club relocated its home ground to the IPE Chonburi Stadium in Chonburi.

In a separate development, Patong City, another football club, marked a notable milestone in 2020. The club participated in the 2020–21 Thai League 3 Southern Region, marking its first appearance in this league. This participation signified a new chapter in the club's history and its evolving presence in regional football.

== Attractions ==
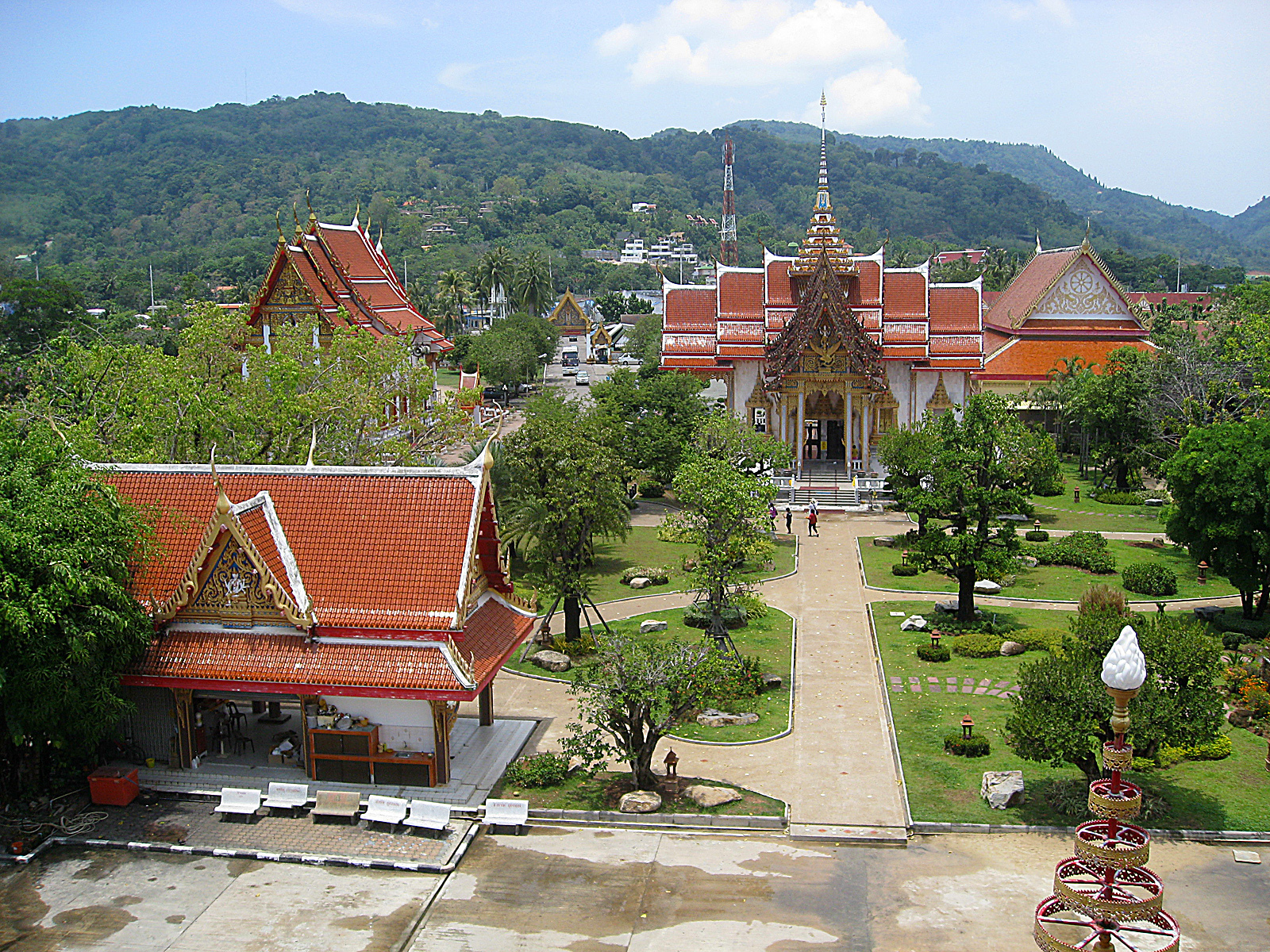
Wat Chalong

- The Phuket Big Buddha is a prominent statue of Gautama Buddha in the Maravichai posture, situated in Phuket. This statue stands at a height of 45 m (148 ft) and spans 25.45 m (83.5 ft) in width. Constructed primarily from concrete and clad in Burmese white marble, it overlooks Ao Chalong Bay. The statue serves as the principal Buddha image for Wat Kitthi Sankaram (Wat Kata) temple. In 2008, Somdet Phra Yanasangwon, the Supreme Patriarch of Thailand, designated the Phuket Big Buddha as the 'Buddhist Treasure of Phuket.'
- The Two Heroines Monument (อนุสาวรีย์วีรสตรี), located in Thalang District, is a memorial dedicated to Thao Thep Kasattri (Kunying Jan) and Thao Sri Sunthon (Mook). These figures are historically significant for their role in mobilizing residents to repel Burmese forces during an invasion in 1785.
- The Thalang National Museum (พิพิธภัณฑสถานแห่งชาติ ถลาง), established in 1985 to commemorate the 200th anniversary of the Thalang War, is an institution that showcases the cultural and historical heritage of Phuket and its surrounding regions.
- Hat Karon (หาดกะรน), known as the second largest tourist beach in Phuket, is situated approximately 20 km (12 mi) from the town center.

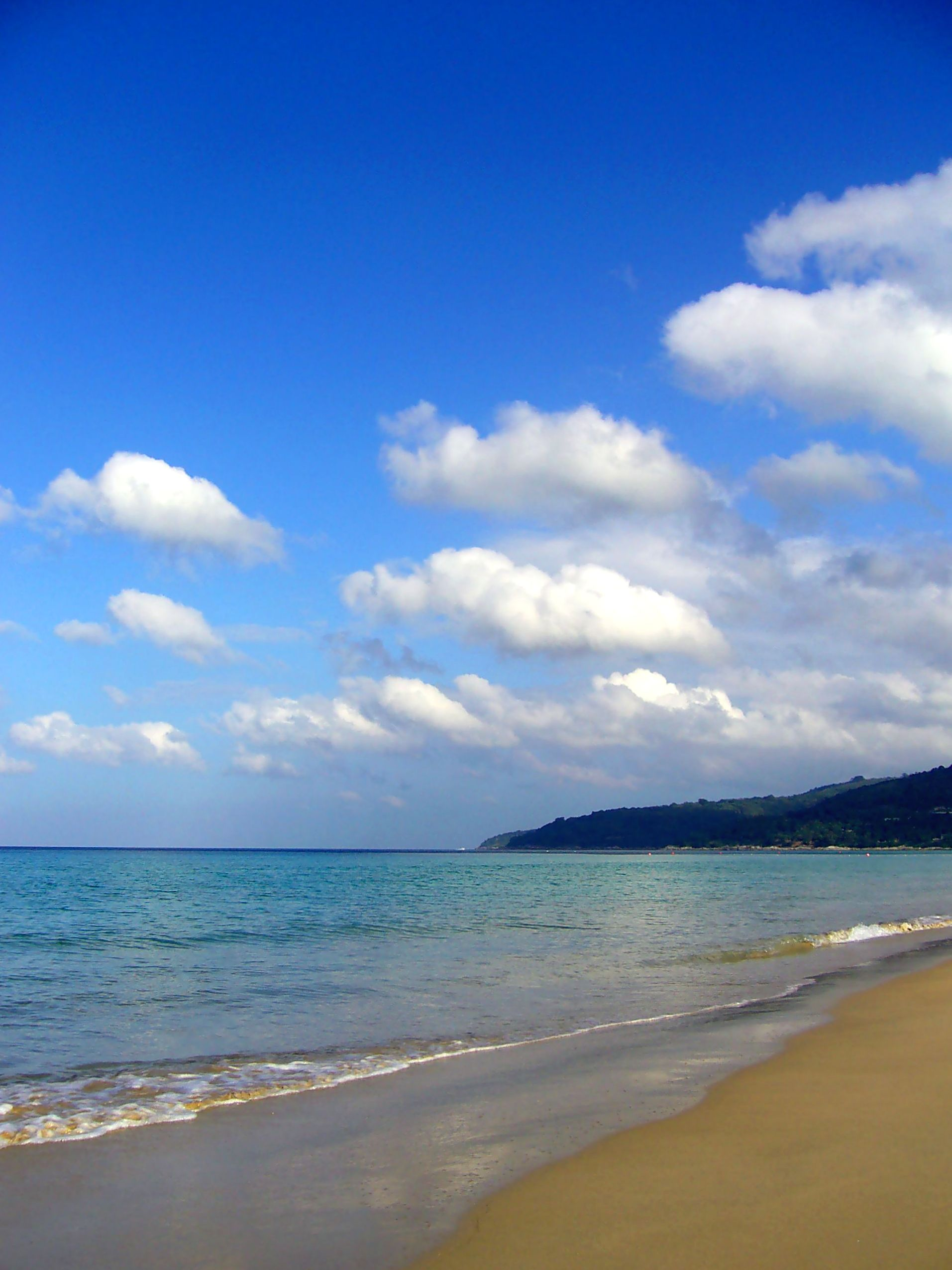
Karon Beach

- On On Hotel, located in downtown Phuket Town, gained international recognition after its appearance in the 2000 film 'The Beach', starring Leonardo DiCaprio.
- Wat Chalong (วัดฉลอง), officially known as Wat Chaiyathararam (วัดไชยธาราราม), is a significant historical temple in Phuket. It features a statue of Luang Pho Cham, a revered figure known for his role in assisting the local populace during the Angyee rebellion in 1876, under the reign of King Rama V.
- Old Phuket Town, encompassing areas around Thalang, Dibuk, Yaowarat, Phang Nga, and Krabi Roads, is distinguished by its Sino-Portuguese architectural style.
- Aquaria Phuket opened on August 24, 2019.
- Freedom Beach, characterized by its fine white sand and clear blue waters, is a popular destination near Phuket. Located close to Patong Beach, it is accessible by boat or through a hiking trail.
- A day trip to the Phi Phi Islands from Phuket typically involves a 50-minute journey by speedboat. These islands are renowned for their scenic beauty and are a favored destination for tourists seeking to experience the natural allure of the region.

== Local culture ==
- The Thao Thep Krasattri and Thao Si Sunthon Fair, observed annually on March 13, commemorates the heroines Thao Thep Krasattri and Thao Si Sunthon. These figures are celebrated for their leadership in mobilizing the people of Thalang to defend against Burmese invaders. This event holds significant historical importance in Phuket.
- Nine Emperor Gods Festival, known in Hokkien as 'Kiú-Hông Sēng-Huē' or 'Kiú-Hông Iâ', and locally among the Chinese community in Phuket as the Vegetarian Festival ('Tsia̍h-tshài-tseh' in Hokkien or 'เทศกาลกินเจ' (กินผัก-เจี๊ยะฉ่าย) in Thai), occurs on the first day of the ninth Chinese lunar month. This period usually falls between late September and early October. During this festival, Phuket islanders of Chinese ancestry adhere to a nine-day vegetarian diet, a practice believed to bring purification and avert troubles in the coming year. The festival is known for its ascetic rituals, including fire-walking and ladder-climbing on sharp blades.
- The Ghost Festival, or 'Phóo-tōo-tseh' in Hokkien ('Û-lân-phûn Sēng-Huē' in full), is celebrated on the middle day of the seventh Chinese lunar month. Central to this festival is the tradition of ancestor worship, which involves preparing food offerings, burning incense, and burning joss paper, symbolizing material items like clothes and gold for the spirits. The festival typically includes serving elaborate vegetarian meals with seats reserved for deceased family members. Activities may also encompass the release of miniature paper boats and lanterns on water, symbolizing guidance for lost souls.
- Phuket King's Cup Regatta (งานแข่งเรือใบชิงถ้วยพระราชทาน), held each December, is a prominent yachting event hosted by the Kata Beach Resort. It attracts participants, predominantly yachtsmen from neighboring countries, competing for various trophies.
- The Laguna Phuket Triathlon (ลากูน่าภูเก็ตไตรกีฬา) is an annual event held each December in Phuket. This triathlon, comprising a 1,800 m (5,900 ft) swim, a 55 km (34 mi) bike race, and a 12 km (7.5 mi) run, along with a 6 km (3.7 mi) fun run, attracts a diverse array of athletes from around the globe.
- The Phuket Travel Fair (เทศกาลเปิดฤดูการท่องเที่ยวจังหวัดภูเก็ต), also known as the Patong Carnival, commences on November 1 each year. Predominantly celebrated in Patong, this event is characterized by colorful parades, sports events, and beauty competitions, attracting significant participation from both foreign tourists and Thai nationals. The opening of the Patong Carnival is a particularly popular event, drawing crowds exceeding 30,000 visitors.
- The Chao Le (Sea Gypsy) Boat Floating Festival (งานประเพณีลอยเรือชาวเล) is observed annually during the middle of the sixth and eleventh lunar months. This festival involves communities from the sea gypsy villages of Rawai and Sapam, Ko Si-re, and Laem La, located near Phuket's northern tip. Key activities include nighttime ceremonies where small boats are set adrift, a tradition akin to the Thai festival of Loi Krathong, aimed at dispelling evil and bringing good fortune.
- Phuket Bike Week is the largest motorbike event in Asia. It annually draws motorcyclists and spectators from various countries, including France. The event features a range of activities such as motorcycle exhibitions, bike parades themed 'Ride for Peace', custom bike contests, and live entertainment. Additionally, it includes competitions like Mr. Phuket Bike Week and showcases bike accessories and apparel from both local and international vendors.

== Twin towns and sister cities ==
Phuket province has several sister cities. They are:

Nice, France (1989)
Las Vegas, United States (1997)
Yantai, China (1997)
Port Blair, India (2005)
Hainan, China (2005)
Nakhodka, Russia (2006)
Suining, China (2016)
Macau, China (2018)

== In popular culture ==
Phuket was a primary filming location for the 2005 film Star Wars: Episode III - Revenge of the Sith, serving as the basis for most of the exterior shots of the planet Kashyyyk, especially during the sequences at the Kachirho Beach location.

== Gallery ==
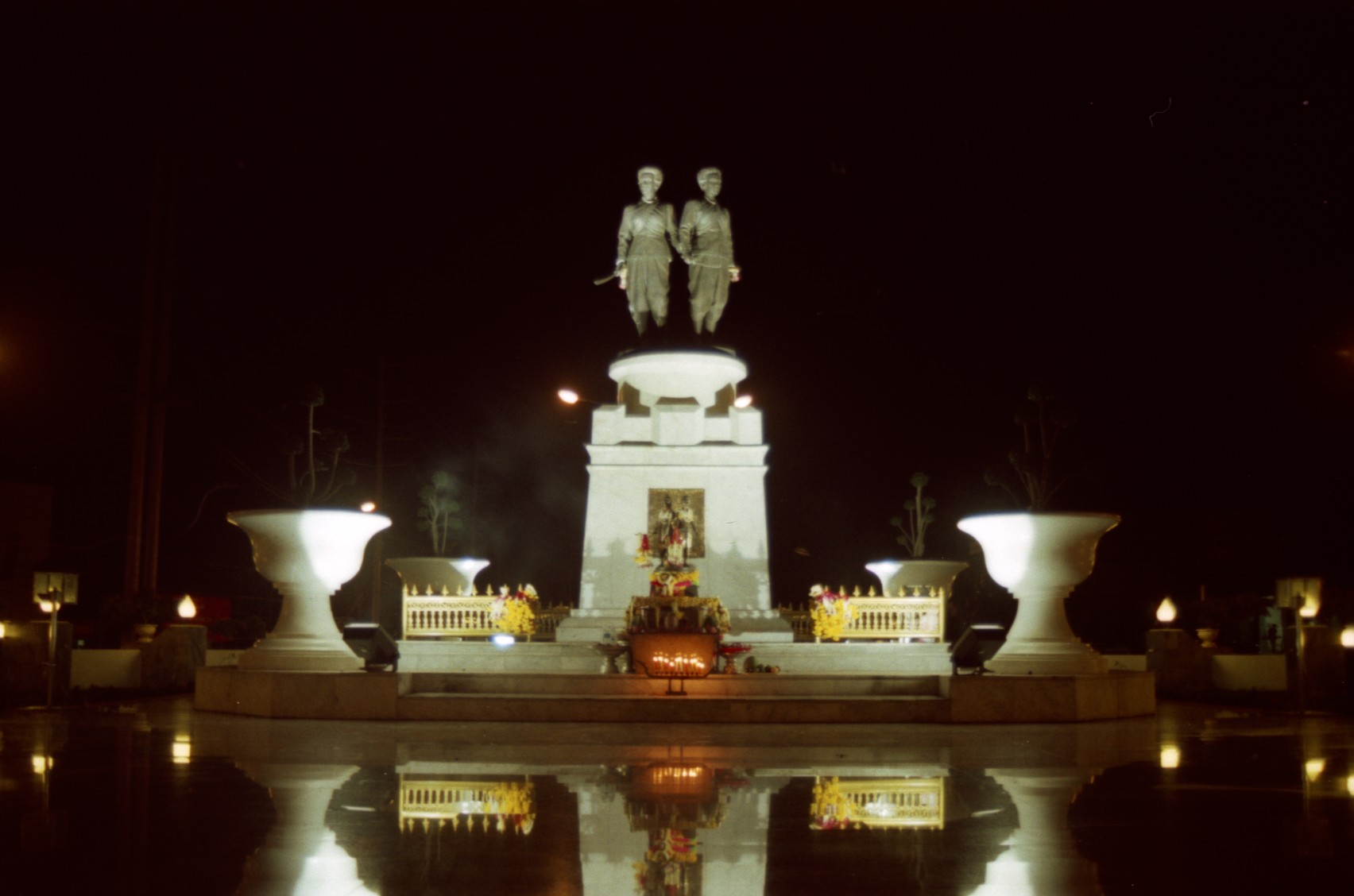
Monument to Thao Thep Kasattri and Thao Sri Sunthon in Phuket

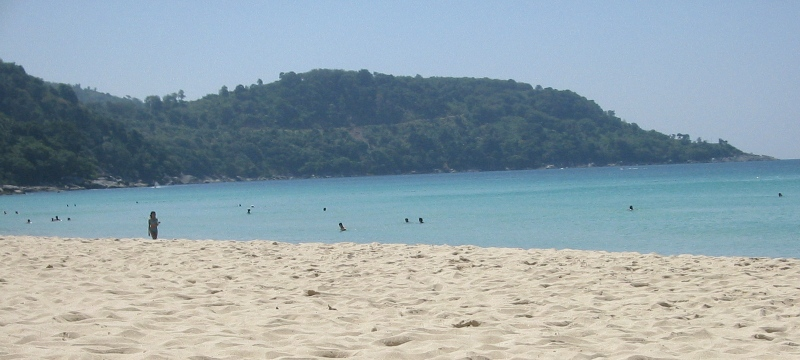
Kata Noi Beach

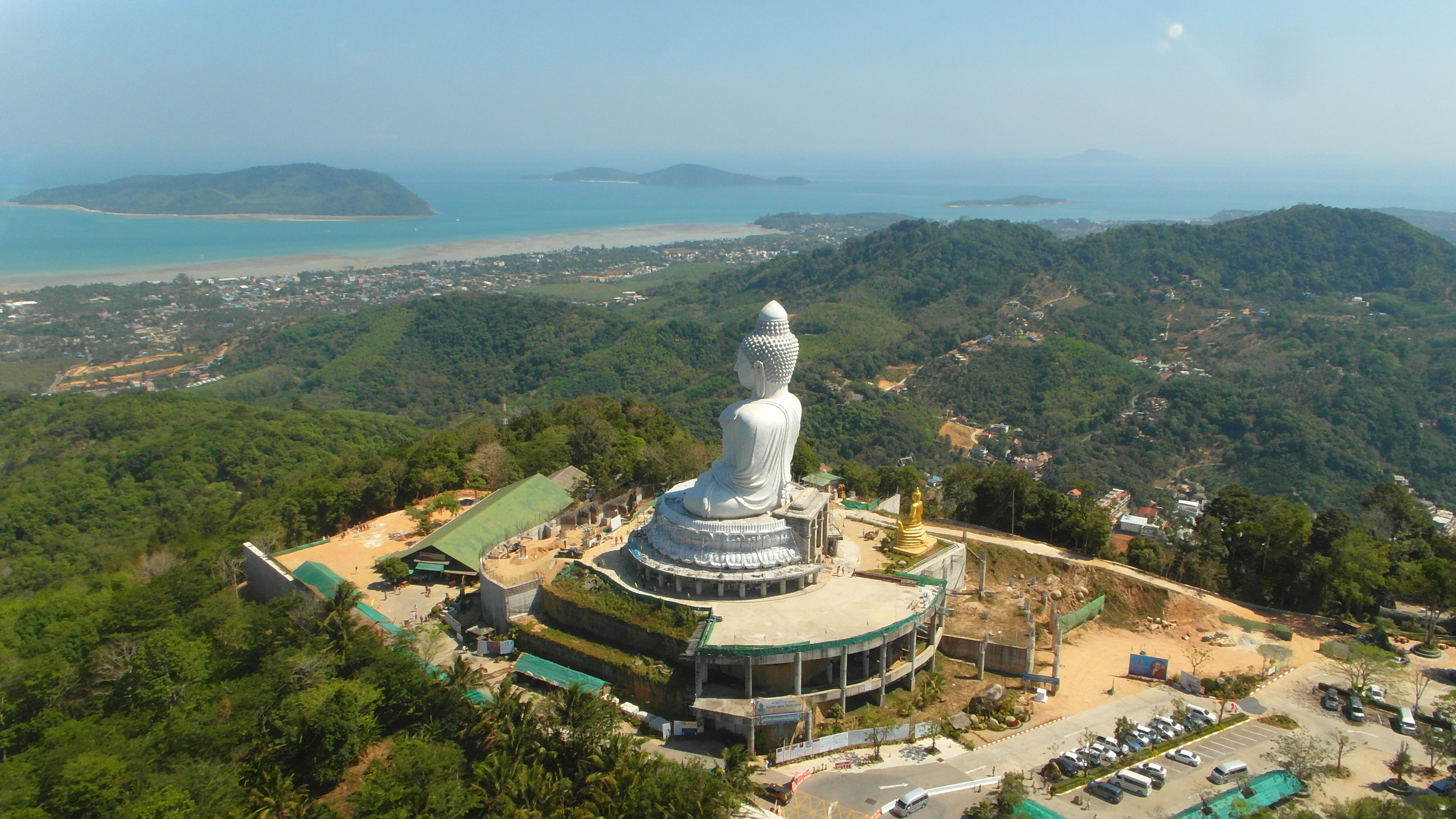
Big Buddha monument overlooking Phuket

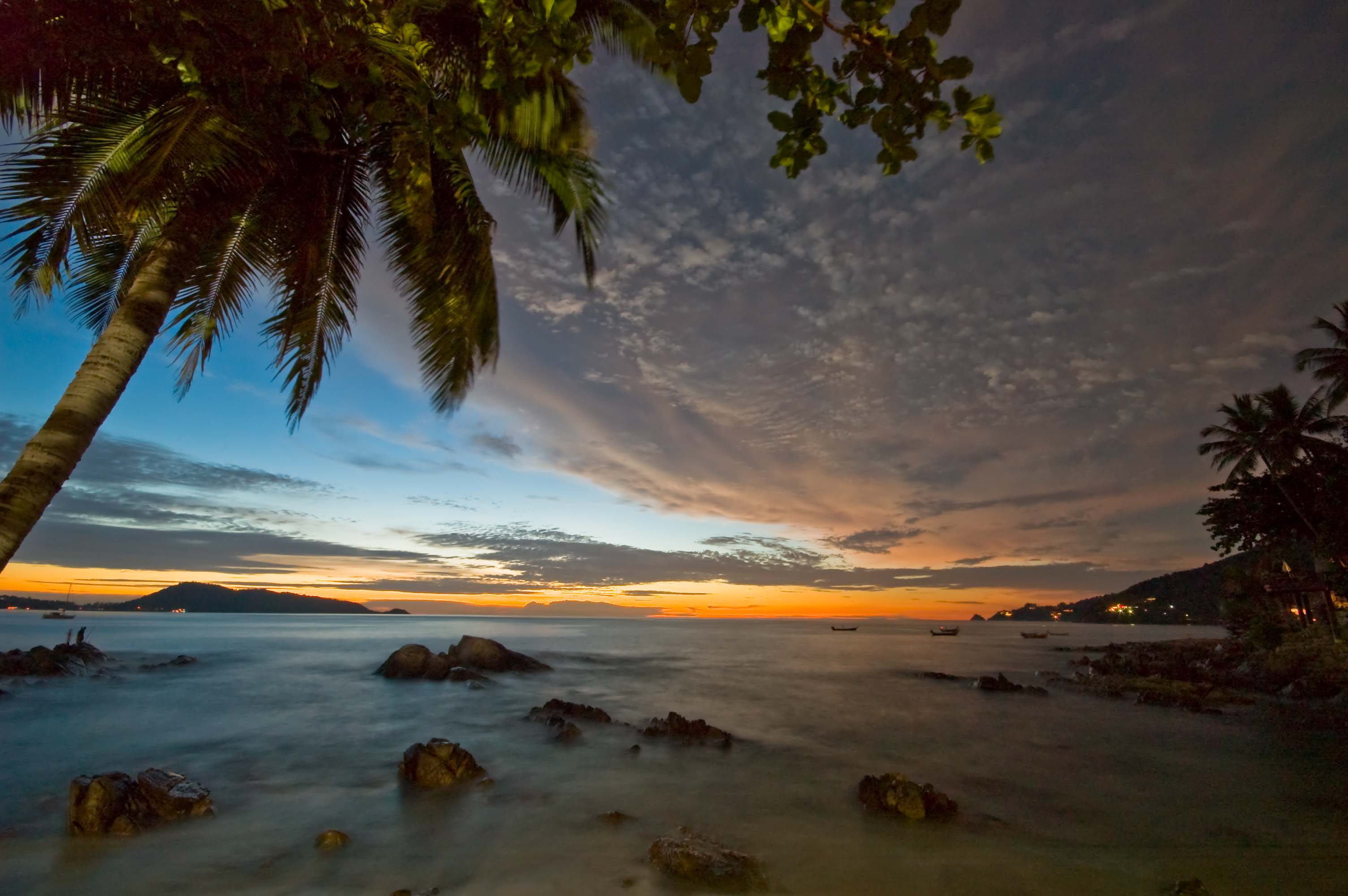
Patong Beach

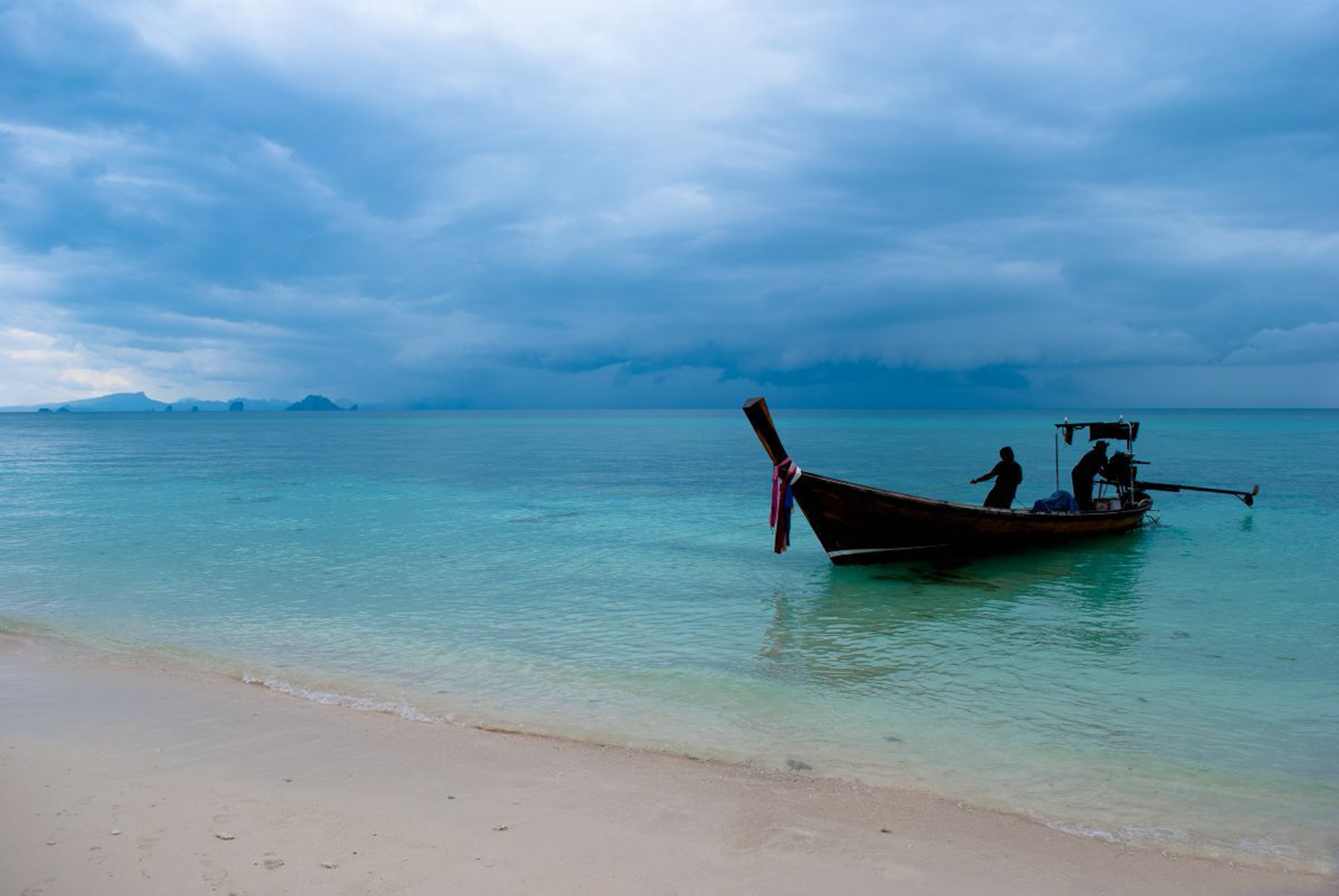
Ko Hae Island

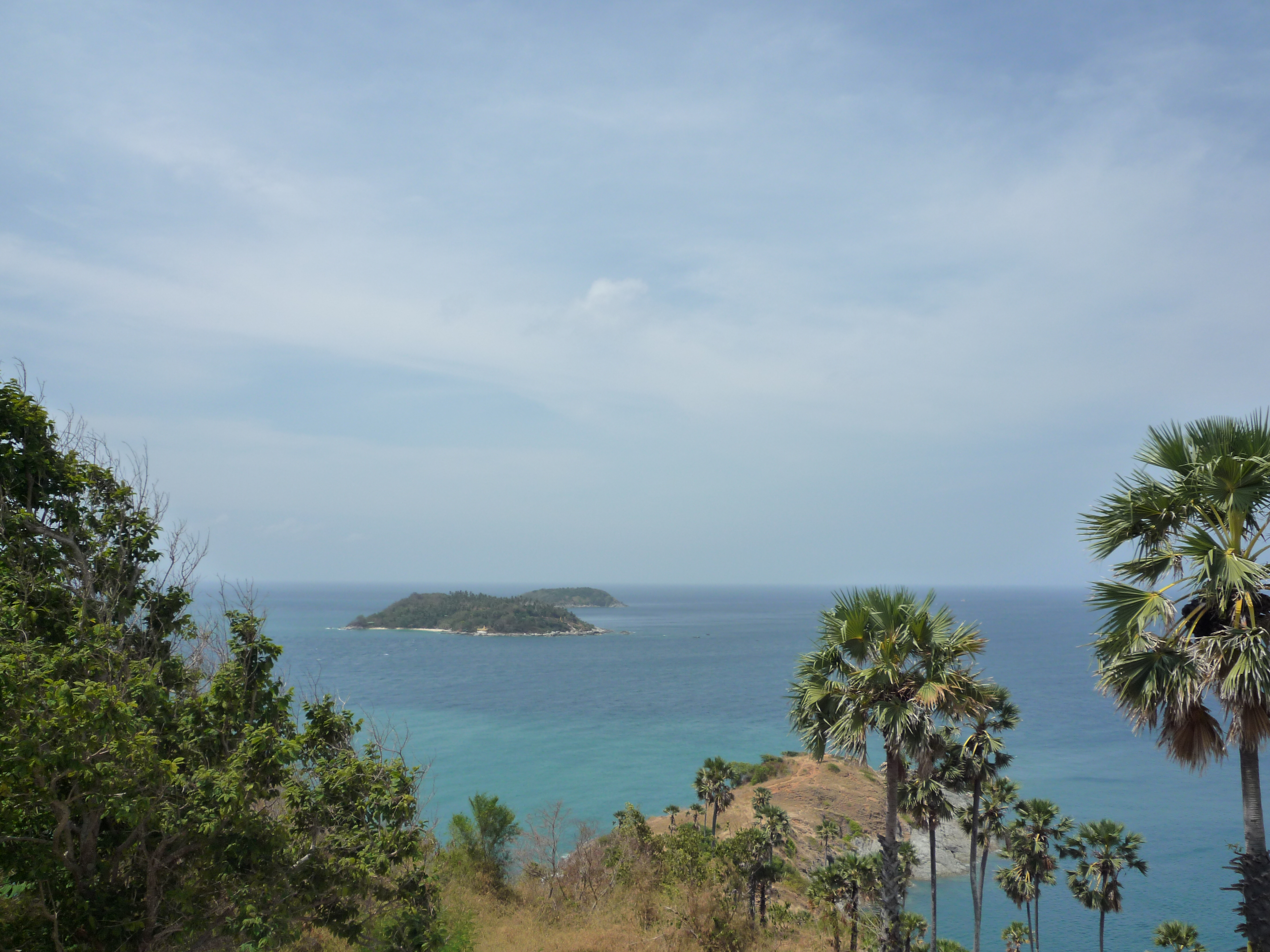
Phromthep Cape and Kaeo Yai Island

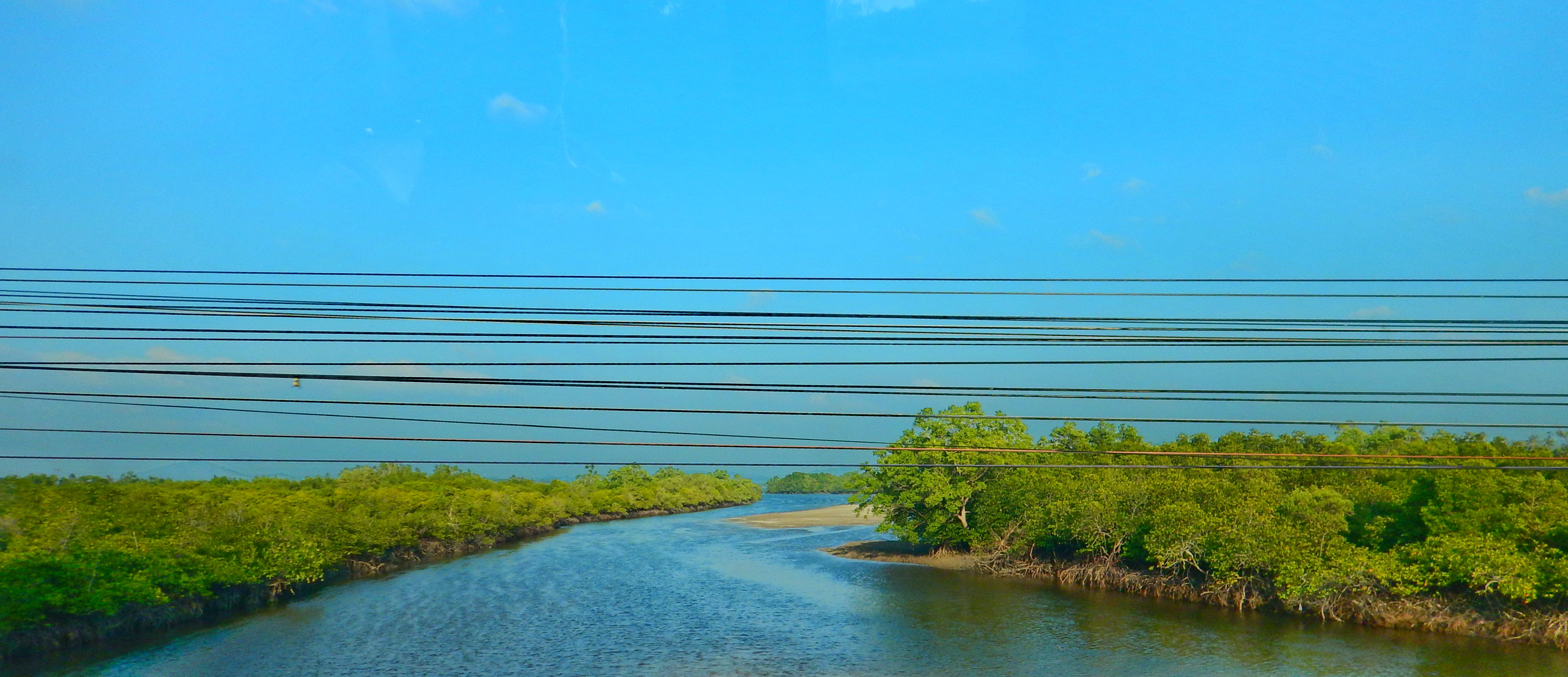
Mai Khao, Thalang District
