= Kathu district =

Kathu กะทู้
- District
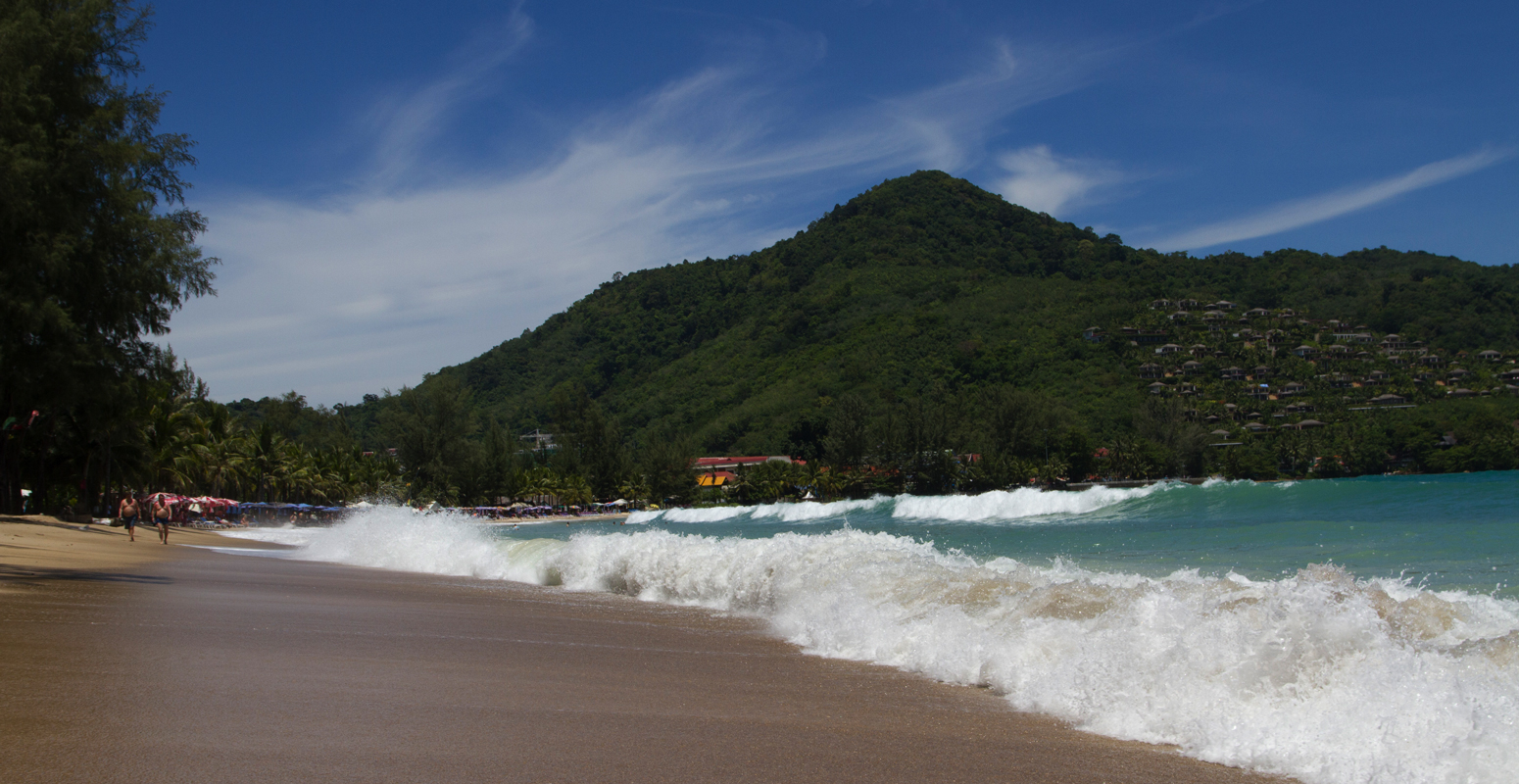
- Kamala beach local popular attraction and location of Phuket FantaSea

- District location in Phuket province
- Coordinates: 7°54′32″N 98°20′0″E
- Country: Thailand
- Province: Phuket
- Seat: Kathu

Area
  - Total: 67.09 km^{2} (25.90 sq mi)

Population (31 March 2004)
  - Total: 43,541
  - Density: 649/km^{2} (1,680/sq mi)
- Time zone: UTC+7 (ICT)
- Postal code: 83150
- Geocode: 8302

Kathu (Thai: กะทู้, pronounced [kā.tʰúː]) is a district (amphoe) of Phuket province, Thailand. The district is in the west of Phuket Island. It borders Thalang to the north, Mueang Phuket to the east and south, and the Andaman Sea to the west.

== Geography ==
Kathu is the district which includes the tourist beach of Patong. Kamala Beach to the north is much less developed.

== History ==
On 5 December 1938 the district was downgraded to a minor district (king amphoe) and became a subordinate of Mueang Phuket district. It was upgraded to a full district again on 10 December 1959.

During the reign of King Mongkut (Rama IV) in the early Rattanakosin period, Kathu suffered a tragedy when two rival Chinese triad gangs were killed here. Gangsters from Mueang Phuket lured members of the Kathu gang to a meal, seizing the opportunity to burn them alive. A total of 413 people were killed, with only one survivor. Today, a shrine named Tong Yong Su (Chinese: 忠勇祠; pinyin: zhōngyǒng cí), meaning "the shrine of courageous and upright ancestors", stands in their memory. Uniquely, it is the only Chinese shrine in Thailand without statues or effigies, instead containing only the spirit tablets of those who perished.

== Administration ==
The district is divided into three sub-districts (tambons), which are further subdivided into 14 villages (mubans). Patong has town (thesaban mueang) status, Kathu has sub-district municipality (thesaban tambon) status, and Kamala is led by a tambon administrative organization (TAO). Each of the municipalities has the name of the sub-district.

Nr.	Name	Thai name	Villages	Pop.
1.	Kathu	กะทู้	8	20,239
2.	Patong	ป่าตอง	-	17,843
3.	Kamala	กมลา	6	5,459

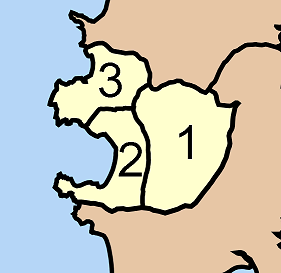
