= Wat Chalong =

Buddhist temple in Phuket Province, Thailand

Coordinates: 7°50′48″N 98°20′12″E

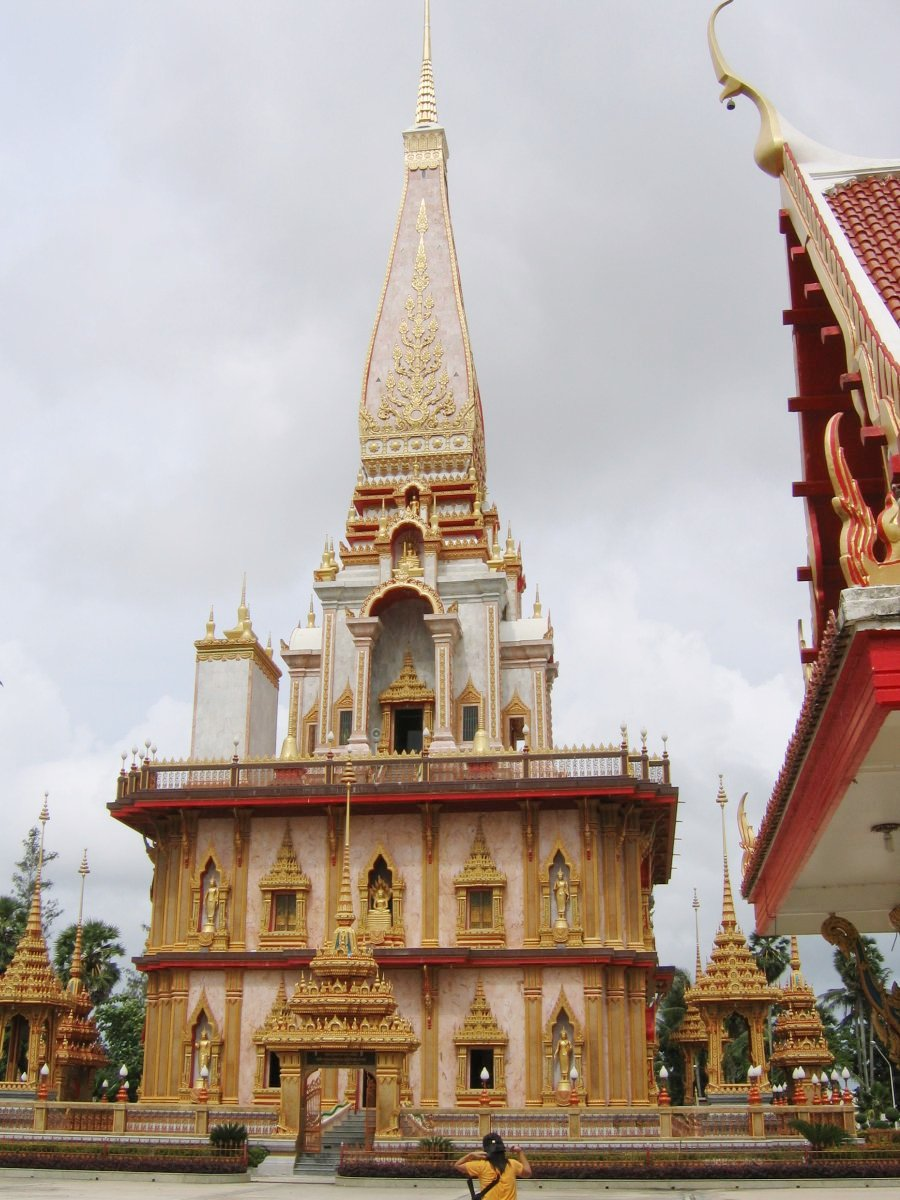
Pagoda of Wat Chalong

The most important of the 29 buddhist temples of Phuket is Wat Chalong (Thai: วัดฉลอง, pronounced [wát t͡ɕʰā.lɔ̌ːŋ]) or officially Wat Chaiyathararam (วัดไชยธาราราม, [wát t͡ɕʰāj.jáʔ.tʰāː.rāː.rāːm]), located in the Chalong Subdistrict, Mueang Phuket District. It is dedicated to two highly venerable monks, Luang Pho Chaem (หลวงพ่อแช่ม, [lǔa̯ŋ pʰɔ̂ː t͡ɕʰɛ̂m]) and Luang Pho Chuang (หลวงพ่อช่วง, [lǔa̯ŋ pʰɔ̂ː t͡ɕʰûa̯ŋ]), who led the citizens of Chalong Subdistrict fighting against the Chinese rebellion in 1876 and with their knowledge of herbal medicine helped the injured.

The large market at Wat Chalong extends into the grounds of the temple and features amplified pop music and Thai-fighting advertisements.

The temple sells trinkets to visitors and the monks assist by storing boxes of items in their main prayer hall.
