= Murder of Nicole Sauvain-Weisskopf =

2021 murder of a Swiss tourist in Thailand

The murder of Nicole Sauvain-Weisskopf, a woman of Swiss nationality on holiday in Phuket, Thailand, occurred in August 2021. She was found dead at Ao Yon waterfall, a popular tourist destination, and thought to have been dead 3 days prior to discovery of the corpse. She was found wearing only a t-shirt and jacket and covered by a black tarp. Police have stated there were signs of rape.

Sauvain-Weisskopf had been admitted into Phuket under a pilot programme to not have to undergo quarantine but was not allowed to leave the Phuket area.

Thai police said on 7 August 2021, they had arrested a 27 year old Phuket man for the killing. Theerawut Tortip admitted to police that he stole from her and killed her. He was seen on CCTV footage going to the waterfall at the same time as Sauvain-Weisskopf.

== Bio ==
Sauvain-Weisskopf was admitted into Phuket under the Phuket Sandbox, a pilot programme for allowing tourists into the country. She was a deputy protocol chief of the Federal Assembly of Switzerland in Germany.

== Crime ==
On August 3, 2021, Terrawat visited the Ao Yon waterfall to collect wild orchids and other plants when he came across Sauvain-Weisskopf, who was dabbling her feet in the water while siting on a rock, wearing shorts and an undershirt. Terrawat became sexually aroused, walking up behind Sauvain-Weisskopf and putting her in a choke hold. After she began to struggle, he forced her head under the water until she lost consciousness. Terrawat proceeded to drag Sauvain-Weisskopf to the shore and removed her shorts and undergarments. When he turned her body over to face up, he saw that her face had turned dark with her tongue swollen and protruding. Terrawat then abandoned his plans of sexually assaulting Sauvain-Weisskopf, having lost his sexual desire. He proceeded to use a black plastic sheet found nearby to cover her body, which he then covered in rocks. Afterwards, he searched her bag, from which he stole Baht 300.

== Guilty verdict ==
Teerawat Thotip was found guilty of murder and sentenced by the court to death. His death sentence was subsequently commuted to life in prison, as he had confessed to the crime, and additional charges of attempted rape and indecent assault were dismissed. Sauvain-Weisskopf's husband and two sons attended Thotip's sentencing virtually from Switzerland through the platform Google Meet.
