= Mueang Phuket district =

Mueang Phuket เมืองภูเก็ต
- District
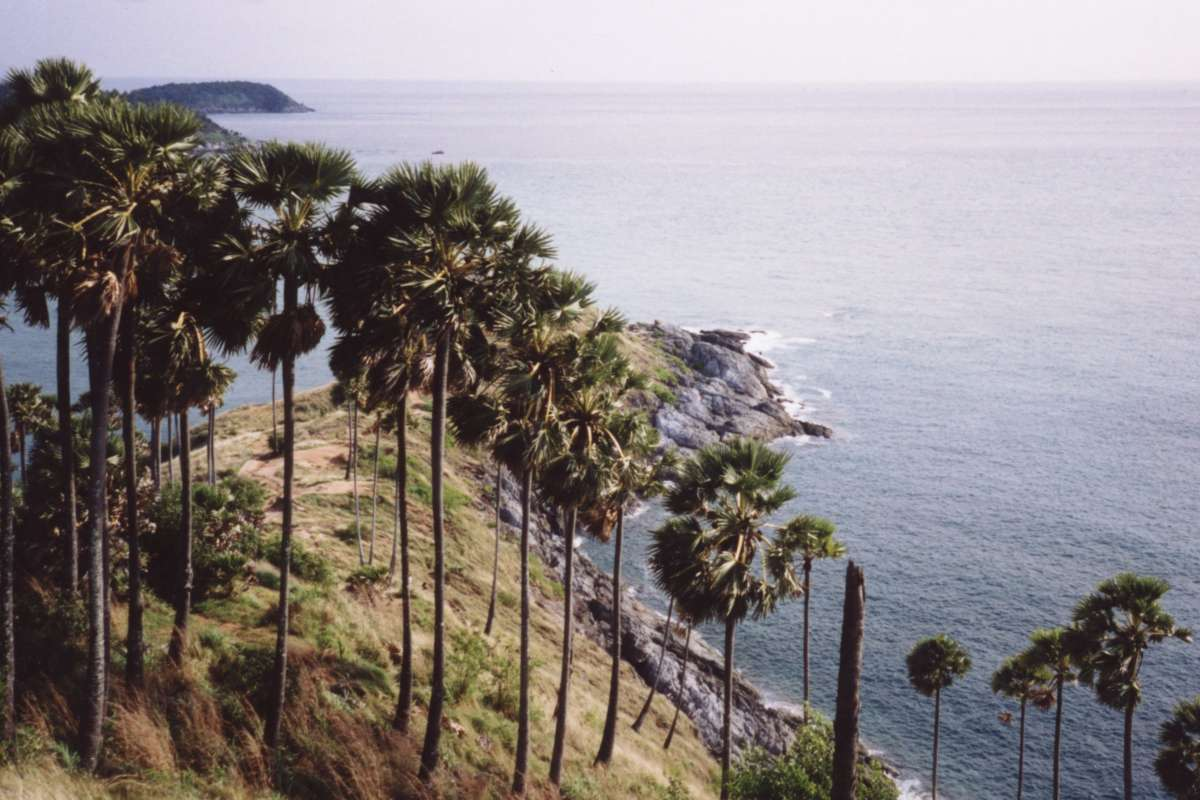
- Promthep Cape, southernmost of the district and province

- District location in Phuket province
- Coordinates: 7°53′24″N 98°23′6″E
- Country: Thailand
- Province: Phuket
- Seat: Talat Yai

Area
  - Total: 224.0 km^{2} (86.5 sq mi)

Population (1 January 1992)
  - Total: 196,733
  - Density: 878.3/km^{2} (2,275/sq mi)
- Time zone: UTC+7 (ICT)
- Postal code: 83000 and 83100
- Geocode: 8301

Mueang Phuket (Thai: เมืองภูเก็ต, pronounced [mɯ̄a̯ŋ pʰūː.kèt]) is the capital district (amphoe mueang) of Phuket province, Thailand. Phuket town itself is in the district's northeast.

== Geography ==
The district encompasses the southern part of the island of Phuket. The western and southern coast consists of several heavily used beaches, from the northwest counter-clockwise: Karon, Kata, Kata Noi, Nai Han, Rawai, and Friendship Beach along Chalong Bay. The beaches are separated from each other by rocky capes, most notably Phromthep Cape at the southernmost tip of the island.

== History ==
Originally named Thung Kha (ทุ่งคา), it was renamed Mueang Phuket on 14 November 1938.

== Temples ==
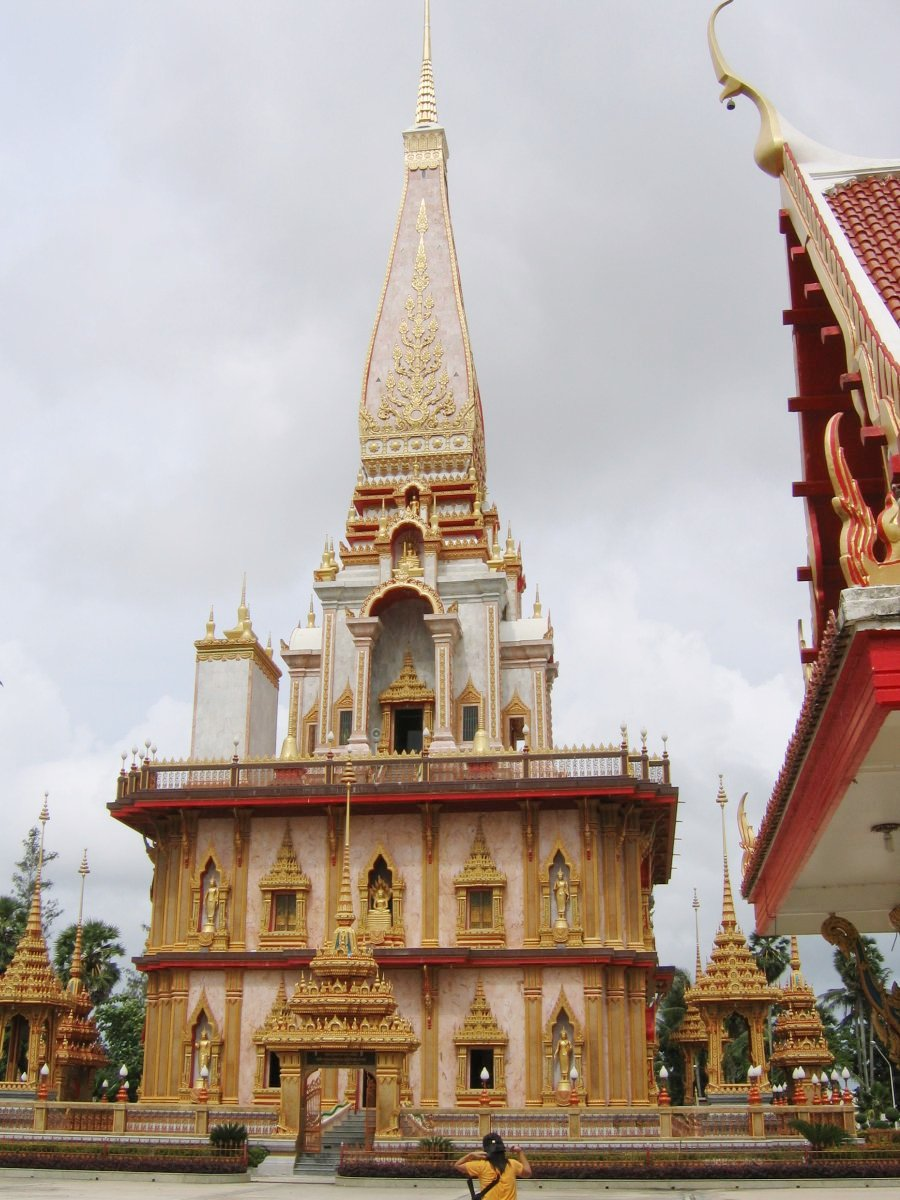
Pagoda, Wat Chalong

The most important of the 29 Buddhist temples of Phuket is Wat Chalong (วัดฉลอง or, more formally, วัดไชยธาราราม). It is dedicated to two venerated monks, Luang Pho Chaem (หลวงพ่อแช่ม) and Luang Pho Chuang (หลวงพ่อช่วง), who, with their knowledge of herbal medicine, helped those injured in a tin miners rebellion in 1876.

== Administration ==
The district is divided into eight sub-districts (tambons), which are further subdivided into 44 villages (mubans). The town of Phuket has city status (thesaban nakhon) and covers tambons Talad Yai and Talad Nuea; Karon, Ratsada, Rawai, and Wichit have sub-district municipality status (thesaban tambon) and each cover the complete same-named tambon. Chalong and Ko Kaeo have a tambon administrative organizations (TAO).

Nr.	Name	Thai name	Villages	Pop.
1.	Talat Yai	ตลาดใหญ่	-	52,192
2.	Talat Nuea	ตลาดเหนือ	-	23,381
3.	Koh Kaeo	เกาะแก้ว	7	10,136
4.	Ratsada	รัษฎา	7	33,534
5.	Wichit	วิชิต	9	38,701
6.	Chalong	ฉลอง	10	18,072
7.	Rawai	ราไวย์	7	13,623
8.	Karon	กะรน	4	7,094

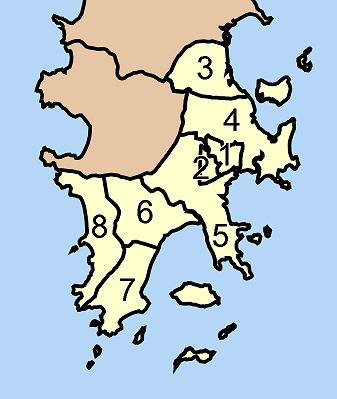
