= Ala-Archa Cemetery =

Cemetery in Bishkek, Kyrgyzstan

Coordinates: 42°53′02″N 74°34′19″E

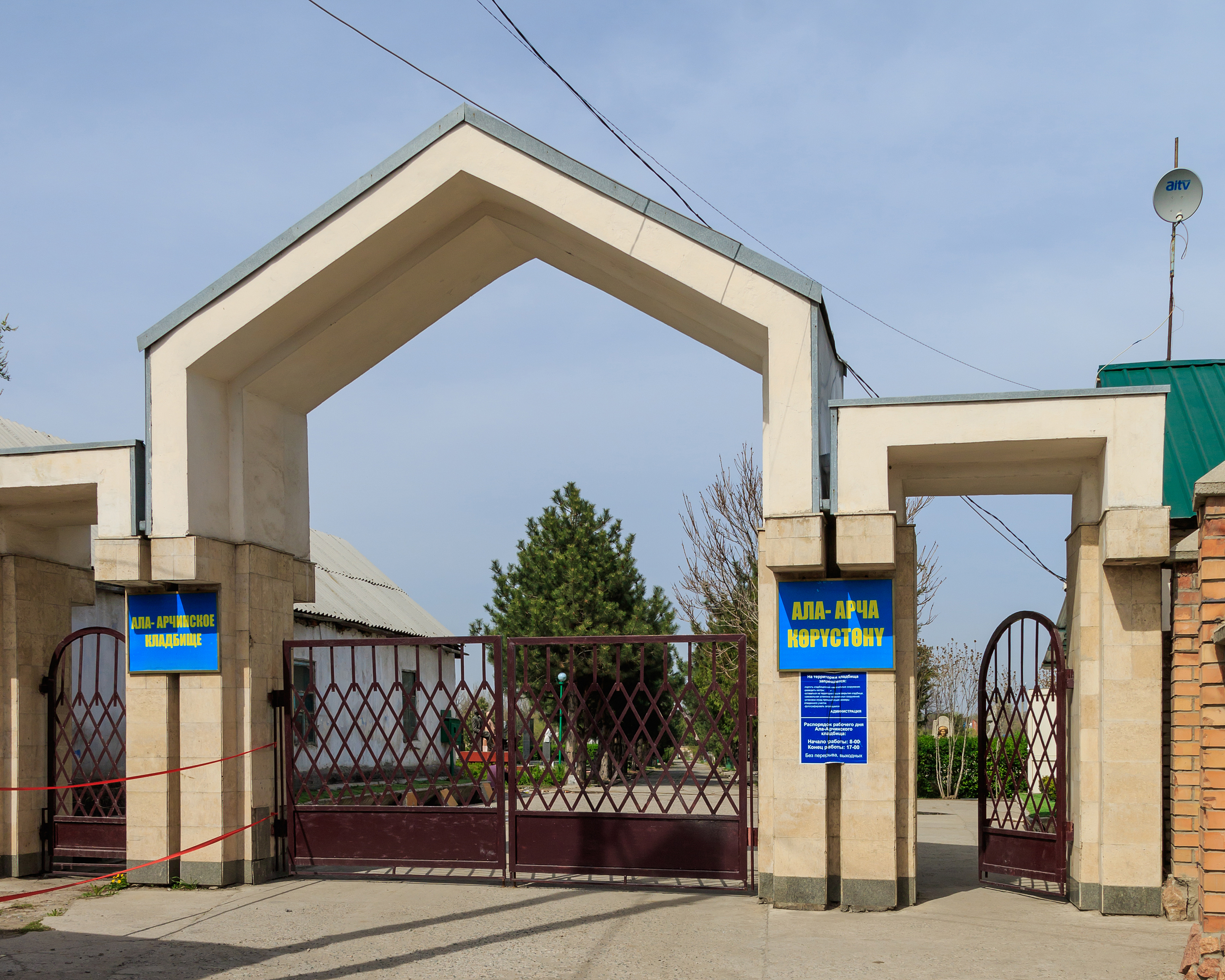
Entrance to the cemetery

The Ala-Archa Cemetery (Kyrgyz: Ала-Арча көрүстөнү; Russian: Ала-Арчинское кладбище) is a public cemetery for honoured individuals in Kyrgyzstan. It is located on Abdumomunova Street in Bishkek to the west of the Avenue of the Young Guards. It is near the Ala Archa National Park in the Tian Shan mountains. It was opened in 1948 and currently occupies 31 hectares of land. It has historical and cultural significance in the City of Bishkek due to its regular use by order of the Government of Kyrgyzstan for the burial and/or re-burial of Kyrgyz citizens who held the status of political or public status such as former Prime Ministers as well as distinguished persons in the fine arts. It has served this purpose since 1973, when the executive committee of the Frunze City Council repurposed it taking into account the limited space available at the time.

== Notable burials ==
- Nasirdin Isanov – The first Prime Minister of Kyrgyzstan from 30 August 1991 to 29 November 1991.
- Jumabek Ibraimov – The 5th Prime Minister of Kyrgyzstan from 25 December 1998 to 4 April 1999.
- Dinara Asanova – Kyrgyz-Soviet filmmaker
- Bubusara Beyshenalieva – The first Kyrgyz ballerina
- Kuluypa Konduchalova – Minister of Culture of the Kyrgyz SSR.
- Asankhan Dzhumakhmatov – Kyrgyz composer
- Sabira Kumushaliyeva – Kyrgyz actress
- Baken Kydykeyeva – Kyrgyz actress
- Abdylas Maldybaev – Composer and operational singer
- Tolomush Okeyev – Kyrgyz screenwriter
- Alykul Osmonov – Poet and literary figure
- Suimenkul Chokmorov – Kyrgyz film actor and artists
- Iskhak Razzakov – First Secretary of the Communist Party of Kirghizia, reburied at Ala-Archa in 2000 from Kuntsevo Cemetery.
- Turdakun Usubaliev – First Secretary of the Communist Party of Kirghizia
