= Turdakun Usubaliev Square =

Public square in Kyrgyzstan

- Government House
- Interactive map of Turdakun Usubaliev Square
- Native name: Эски Аянт (Kyrgyz); Старая Площадь (Russian)
- Type: Public Square
- Maintained by: City of Bishkek
- Location: Gapar Aytiev St, Bishkek, Kyrgyzstan
- Coordinates: 42°52′45″N 74°36′16″E

Construction
- Completion: 1954

Other
- Designer: Yevgeny Gavrilovich Pisarskoi (Евгений Гаврилович Писарской)

Turdakun Usubaliev Square (Kyrgyz: Турдакун Усубалиев аянты; Russian: Площадь Турдакуна Усубалиева) is a public square in Bishkek, the capital of Kyrgyzstan.

== History ==
The construction of the area, then known as Old Square, started in 1936 on the occasion of the 19th anniversary of the October Revolution. Construction of the square continued during the Great Patriotic War (known as World War II in the West) and was completed in 1954. In 1957, a Government House was built, in which the Central Committee of the Communist Party of Kirghizia and the Council of Ministers of the Kyrgyz SSR convened. The square began its reconstruction in 1964, with the renovation effort being led by Soviet architect Yevgeny Pisarskoi. By 1970, the square had now included a city theatre. The square served as a place for military parades and rallies during the Soviet era. After the opening of Ala-Too Square in 1984, the square became less important and was used less often. in June 2016, a group of private investors decided to renovate the square as a gift to the City of Bishkek.

In 2020, Old Square was officially renamed Turdakun Usubaliev Square in honor of the long-serving First Secretary of the Communist Party of Kirghizia.

== Landmarks ==
- American University of Central Asia
- Government House/Office of the Prime Minister of Kyrgyzstan.
- Panfilov Park
- Glory Monument

== See also ==
- Government of Kyrgyzstan
- Ala-Too Square
- Toktogul Square
- Victory Square, Bishkek
- Panfilov Street, Bishkek
