= Darkul Kuyukova =

Soviet actor (1919–1997)

- Даркүл Күйүкова
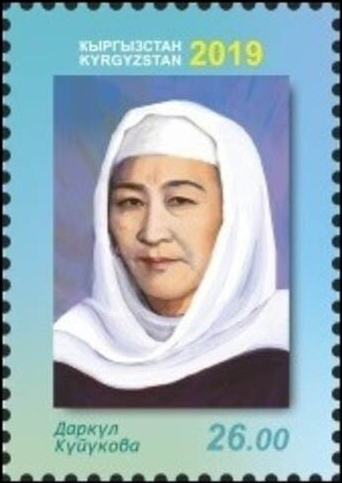
- Kuyukova on a 2019 Kyrgyz stamp
- Born: May 15, 1919; Tokoldosh, Turkestan Autonomous Soviet Socialist Republic, Soviet Union (present-day Kyrgyzstan)
- Died: March 20, 1997 (aged 77); Bishkek, Kyrgyzstan
- Occupation: Actor

Darkul Kuyukova (Note: Kyrgyz: Даркүл Күйүкова, romanized: Darku̇l Ku̇ĭu̇kova; Russian: Даркуль Куюкова, romanized: Darkul Kuyukova; Also given as Darkül Küjükowa) (15 May, 1919 – 20 March, 1997) was a Kyrgyz and Soviet actress. She was a laureate of the State Prize of the Kirghiz SSR.

== Life ==
Kuyukova was born in Semirechye Oblast in 1919. She was born on 15 May.

She married Ismailbek Abdubachaev who had graduated from a Moscow theatre school and in 1948 they had a daughter, Raema Abdubachaeva, who would go on to be a leading actress herself.

In 1963 she had a part in the Kyrgyz film Heat by Larissa Shepitko. 22-year-old Larissa Shepitko's shot the film in extreme heat. It was said that the film melted in the camera due to the heat and Shepitko directed some of the film from a stretcher as she suffered from jaundice.

In 1965 she took a major part in Andrei Konchalovsky's first film The First Teacher.

Her elder brother invented the phrase the "Four Daughters of Tököldösh" which associated her and three others with their birthplace. The other three were Sabira Kumushaliyeva, Baken Kydykeyeva, and Saira Kiyizbaeva.

In 2019 in what would have been her 100th birthday year a postage stamp was made available in Kyrgyzstan. There was a memorial celebration at the Cinema House in Bishkek. The film's highlighted included "The First Teacher", Bolotbek Shamshiyev's "The White Ship" which was in the Berlin Film Festival and Kadyrjan Kydyraliev's "An Ancestral Valley".

== Awards ==
She was recognised as a People's Artist of the USSR and she was given the Togtogul State Prize. The State Prize of the Kirghiz SSR is a literary award that is given every two years and must be worn above any other award.

Kuyukova died in Bishkek in 1997.
