= Abdukhalim Raimjanov =

Soviet and Kyrgyz hematologist, professor, and academician (born 1943)

Abdukhalim Raimzhanov
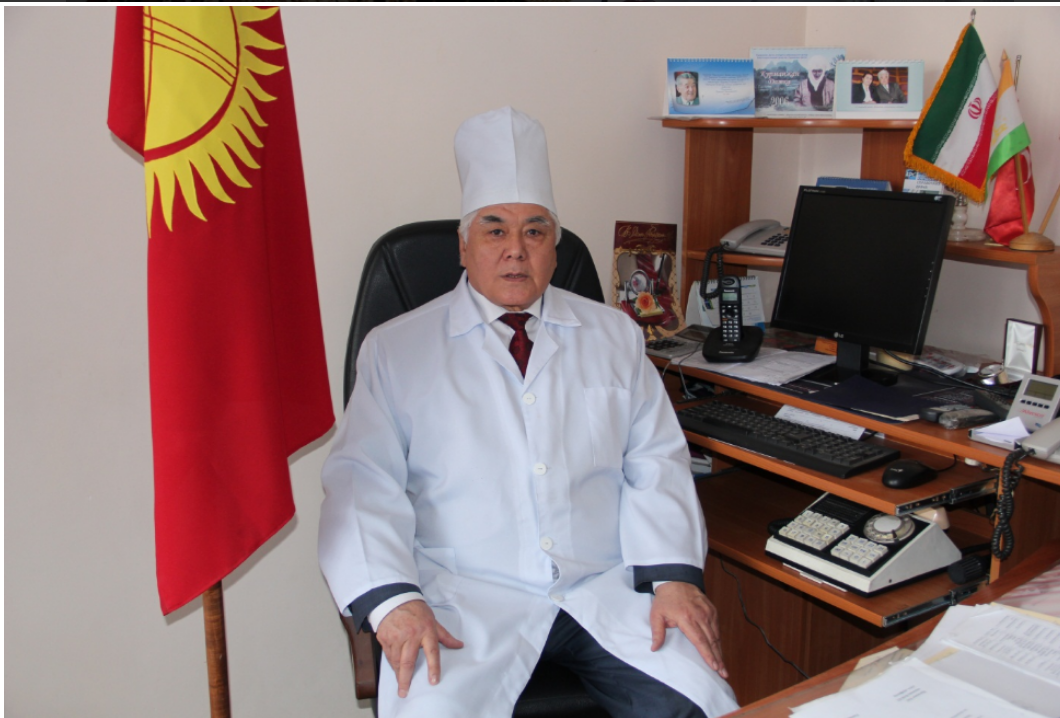
- Born: Abdukhalim Raimzhanovich Raimzhanov; October 5, 1943 (age 83); Molotovabad, Frunzensky District, Osh Region, Kirghiz SSR, USSR
- Education: Kyrgyz State Medical Institute (1965)
- Known for: Founder of the hematology service in Kyrgyzstan
- Awards: Order of Danaker; Dank Medal; Order of Sharaf; State Awards of the Kyrgyz Republic; Badge "Excellence in Healthcare"
- Scientific career
- Fields: Hematology
- Workplaces: Kyrgyz State Medical Academy; Kyrgyz Scientific Center of Hematology
- Doctoral advisor: Andrei Ivanovich Vorobyov, Academician of the Russian Academy of Sciences (RAS); Mirrakhimov Mirsad Mirrakhimovich, Academician of NAS KR and RAS

Abduhalim Raimzhanovich Raimzhanov (Kyrgyz: Абдухалим Раимжанович Раимжанов; born October 5, 1943, Uch-Korgon, Kyrgyz SSR) is a Soviet and Kyrgyz hematologist, Doctor of Medical Sciences, professor, and academician of the National Academy of Sciences of the Kyrgyz Republic. He is known as one of the founders of hematology in Kyrgyzstan and the creator of the Kyrgyz Scientific Center of Hematology.

== Biography ==
Raimzhanov was born on October 5, 1943, in Uch-Korgon village, Batken Region. He graduated from Pushkin Secondary School in 1959 with a gold medal and received his medical degree with honors from the Kyrgyz State Medical Institute in 1965.

Between 1965 and 1989, Raimzhanov advanced through academic positions at the Faculty Therapy department. In 1970, he defended his PhD dissertation; in 1988, his doctoral dissertation at the All-Union Hematology Research Center in Moscow. In 1989, he was awarded the title of professor.

He headed the Kyrgyz Scientific Center of Hematology from 1997 to 2016. Since 2017, he serves as professor of family medicine at the Kyrgyz State Medical Academy.

== Scientific Contributions ==
His academic research covers hematology, high-altitude medicine, and climate therapy. Raimzhanov has authored over 300 publications, including 24 monographs, more than 30 methodological guidelines, and journal articles.

He supervised 1 Doctor of Sciences and 12 Candidates of Medical Sciences. His work has been presented at conferences in Russia, Iran, Turkey, Australia, Japan, and Germany.

== Public Service ==
Raimzhanov served as president of the Rudaki Tajik Association in Kyrgyzstan (1992–2008) and led the Kyrgyzstan–Iran Friendship Society since 1997. Between 2000 and 2005, he was Deputy Chairman of the Assembly of the People of Kyrgyzstan.

== Honors and Recognition ==
His awards include:

- Honored Doctor of the Kyrgyz SSR (1989)
- Honored Scientist of the Kyrgyz Republic (2011)
- Order of Danaker (2004)
- Dank Medal (1998)
- Order of Sharaf (Tajikistan, 2003)

== Selected publications ==
Monographs

- Raimzhanov, A.R. (2002). Aplastic Anemia and Mountain Climate. Bishkek.
- Mirrakhimov, M.M., Yusupova, N.Ya., Raimzhanov, A.R. (1977). Hypo- and Aplastic Anemias. Leningrad: Medicine.

Articles

- Mamatov, S.M., Raimzhanov, A.R. (1999). "Functional Features of Hematopoiesis in Patients with Aplastic Anemia during High-Altitude Climate Therapy." Archives of Iranian Medicine, 2(3), pp. 143–149.
- Dzhakypbaev, O.A. (2016). "Hemorrhagic Microthrombovasculitis: Primary Hemostasis and Immunological Indicators". Clinical Oncohematology. 9 (1): 70–74. doi:10.21320/2500-2139-2016-9-1-70-74.
