= Order of Manas =

Highest order of Kyrgyzstan

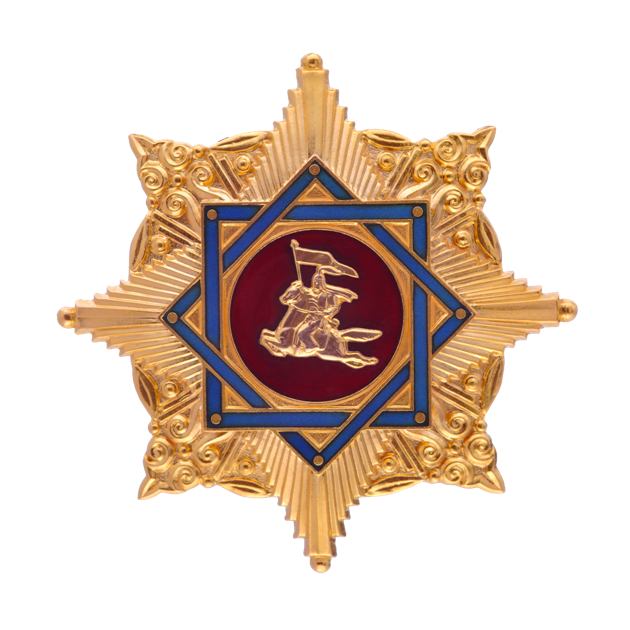
- Star of the order
- Type: State order
- Awarded for: Outstanding service to Kyrgyzstan
- Presented by: Kyrgyzstan
- Eligibility: Kyrgyz and foreign citizens
- Status: active
- Established: 16 April 1996
- First award: 4 February 1997
- Ribbon of the order

Precedence
- Next (higher): Hero of the Kyrgyz Republic

The Order of Manas (Kyrgyz: Манас ордени, romanized: Manas ordeni; Russian: Орден «Манас», romanized: Orden "Manas") is the highest order of Kyrgyzstan. The order is awarded by the President of Kyrgyzstan. Established in 1996, the order recognizes outstanding service to Kyrgyzstan. Higher than this award is only the title of Hero of the Kyrgyz Republic with the presentation of the Ak-Shumkar Medal.

== Gallery ==
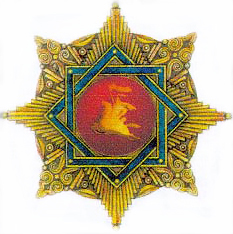
The award in the First Class.

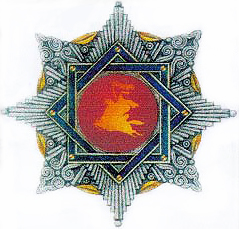
The award in the Second Class.

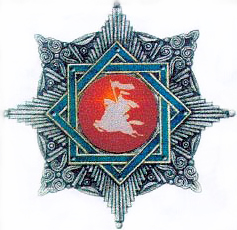
The award in the Third Class.

== Notable recipients ==
- Süleyman Demirel the 9th President of Turkey (1998)
- Chinghiz Aitmatov, writer, one of the best known figures in Kyrgyzstan's literature.(1999)
- Almazbek Atambayev. former President of Kyrgyzstan (1 December 2011)
- Sooronbay Jeenbekov, President of Kyrgyzstan (2015)
- Sopubek Begaliev, founder of the Assembly of People of the Kyrgyz Republic (1997)
- Abibilla Kudayberdiev, former Minister of Defense of Kyrgyzstan
- Xi Jinping, General Secretary of the Chinese Communist Party and President of China (13 June 2019)
- Vladimir Putin, President of Russia (22 November 2017)
- Nursultan Nazarbayev, first President of Kazakhstan
- Kofi Annan, former Secretary-General of the United Nations
- Kuluypa Konduchalova, Kyrgyz-Soviet teacher, politician and cultural minister.
- Sapar Isakov, former Prime Minister of Kyrgyzstan
- Turdakun Usubaliev, former First Secretary of the Central Committee of the Communist Party of Kyrgyzstan.
- Sadyk Sher-Niyaz, film director, public and statesman, former Minister of Culture, Member of Parliament, Ambassador of Kyrgyzstan to France (2023)
- Recep Tayyip Erdoğan the President of Turkey (2024)
- Vladimir Ploskikh, member of the Kyrgyz Academy of Sciences
- Ilham Aliyev, the 4th president of Azerbaijan (2026)

== See also ==
- Orders, decorations, and medals of Kyrgyzstan
