= Roza Amanova =

Kyrgyz singer (born 1973)

Roza Amanova (born 23 February 1973) is a famous Kyrgyz singer. Dastanchy (folklore storyteller - dastan), composer, and komuz players. People's Artist of the Kyrgyz Republic (2009). Honored Artist of Kazakhstan (1998). Laureate of the State Prize of the Kyrgyz Republic named after Toktogul in literature, art, and architecture (2011). Member of the Union of Composers of the Kyrgyz Republic. Chairman of the Kyrgyz Traditional Music Foundation. Doctor of Art History, Professor (in Kyrgyz folk-professional traditional music).

== Early life and education ==
After graduating from high school, Amanova studied at the Murataaly Kurenkeev Music College, and later at the National Conservatory in Bishkek. She majored in komuz playing. Amanova became a singer after meeting outstanding akyns like Estebes Tursunaliev, Asek Zhumabaev, Bolush Madazimov. She was also influenced by the creative upbringing of her parents.

In 1998, Amanova entered graduate school at the Kurmangazy Kazakh National Conservatory. In 2006, she defended her Ph.D. thesis on the topic: Traditional music of the Kyrgyz.

== Career ==
The first works of Amanova’s professional journey were: Oruk komuz, Oogan yy, Yntymak, Armanda ketti bir ak kuu, Karlygach. The singer’s song Men Seni Sagyngym Kelet, based on the words of A. Omurkanov, brought her universal fame.

In addition, Amanova performed many songs by famous authors of Kyrgyzstan accompanied by komuz. These songs became widespread and are performed by other singers to this day. Amanova made a great contribution to Kyrgyz traditional music (in particular dastans). At the celebration of the 500th anniversary of the hero of the Kyrgyz epic Kurmanbek, which had never before been performed by anyone in a complete variation, she managed to sing the entire epic accompanied by komuz. In addition, small epics and dastans are known for their performance. Amanova is also known as an outstanding komuzist. She performed works by outstanding komuz composers.

=== Teaching ===
Amanova worked for a long time as the director of the conservatory of the Kyrgyz-Turkish Manas University. During this time, she raised many students who became winners of various competitions. With some of her students, Amanova created the band Marzhan, which performs Kyrgyz folk songs, and dastans at various concerts and festivals. The singer actively collaborates with foreign cultural figures, so her repertoire includes Kazakh, Turkish, and songs of the Kyrgyz people of China.

== Awards and honors ==
- Honored Artist of Kazakhstan (1998).
- Honored Artist of the Kyrgyz Republic (1999) - for services in the field of art.
- People's Artist of the Kyrgyz Republic (2009) - for great contribution to the development of the national musical art of the republic.
- Toktogul State Prize of the Kyrgyz Republic in literature, art, and architecture (2011) - for the concert and performing program.
