= Kuluypa Konduchalova =

Kyrgyz-Soviet teacher, politician and cultural minister

- Күлүйпа Кондучалова
- Born: 15 June 1920; Kara-Jygach, Russian Empire
- Died: 7 September 2013 (aged 93); Bishkek, Kyrgyzstan
- Other names: Kuliyipa Konduchalova, Kuliypa Konduchalova, Kuljypa Konduchalova, Kulyupa Konduchalova, Külüypa Konduchalova
- Occupations: teacher, cultural minister

Kuluypa Konduchalova (Kyrgyz: Күлүйпа Кондучалова; 15 June 1920 – 7 September 2013) was a Kyrgyz-Soviet teacher, politician and cultural minister. She is most-known as a patron of culture and for the work she did to promote Kyrgyz arts to international audiences. She was honored as a Hero of the Kyrgyz Republic, twice honored with the Order of Manas in the 1st and 3rd degrees, decorated as a Commander of the Order of Lenin and was twice awarded the Order of the Red Banner of Labour.

== Early life ==
Kuluypa Konduchalova was born on 15 June 1920 in the village of Kara-Jygach, (now located in the Alamüdün District, Chüy Region) in the Kyrgyz area of the Russian Empire. One of nine siblings, only she and her two brothers, Iskender and Seideh, survived. Her father was a carpenter and craftsman, and encouraged her in her desire for an education. She began her schooling at the newly opened rural school in Kara-Jygach in 1928 and was inspired by her first teacher to become an educator. When she was twelve, she moved to Frunze and entered the Kyrgyz State Pedagogical Institute, graduating in 1938.

== Career ==
After completing her studies, Konduchalova worked as a teacher first being placed in a boarding school in Kulanak. After one year of serving as the head teacher, she was promoted to school director. Joining the Kyrgyz Communist Party in 1940, Konduchalova was appointed as the Tien-Shan Regional secretary of the Komsomol. She did not want the post, but could not refuse and began lecture tours for the Party. In 1942, she was lecturing in Leningrad during the siege of the city. Between 1943 and 1945, Konduchalova studied in Moscow at the Communist Party of the Soviet Union's Higher Party School, at the same time as the well-known Kazak journalist, Aytkesh Toiganbayev. Despite the war, Konduchalova later remembered fondly the numerous cultural events she and her classmates attended. She married Abdi Orolbayev, a financier, with whom she had a son, Diyas, and two daughters, Gylzhamal and Irina.

Returning home at the end of the war, Konduchalova first worked in the Propaganda and Agitation Department of the Kirghiz Soviet Socialist Republic. In 1947, she was appointed as the Agitprop secretary for the Jalal-Abad Regional Committee of the Communist Party. Serving in the post through 1949, she simultaneously was appointed in 1948 as the secretary of the Presidium of the Supreme Soviet of the Kirghiz SSR. From 1947, she served as a deputy in the Kirghiz Supreme Soviet, acting as deputy chair of that body from 1949 to 1952. In 1953, she became the Kyrgyz Minister of Foreign Affairs and the following year, though she continued serving as a deputy in the Kirghiz Supreme Soviet, was elected as a deputy to the Supreme Soviet of the USSR. The Ministry of Foreign Affairs took on an important role at this time, because the only Soviet Republics recognized by the United Nations after the war were Belarus and Ukraine. As the centralized structure had collapsed during the war, Konduchalova became responsible for insuring that Kyrgyz diplomats were informed on international developments and law, had proficiency in English and French, and were provided with the necessary materials from TASS to perform their duties.

From 1958 Konduchalova headed the Ministry of Culture and in that year organized the 2nd Decade of Kyrgyz Art and Literature, which performed in Moscow, the first Kyrgyz performance in Russia since the war ended. Some of the most-known Kyrgyz performers of the 1960s and 1970s participated in the show, including Bübüsara Beyshenalieva, Artyk Myrzabayev, and Uran Sarbagishev, all of whom became People's Artists of the Kirghiz SSR or USSR, among others. She organized weekly artistic and literary events and performances from the beginning of the 1960s to promote the country's cultural heritage. Konduchalova organized cultural exchange activities and exhibitions throughout the Soviet republics, but also abroad, traveling to Belgium, Canada, Denmark, France, Sweden and Syria. Within the country over the next two decades, she directed the Ministry to establish over 2,500 libraries; over 1,000 cinemas; 220 local houses of culture; 97 institutions to promote cultural education in the arts, dance and music; 6 theaters for dramatic presentation; 6 museums; 3 publishing houses; and the Kyrgyk Philharmonic Society. Konduchalova also promoted the development of architectural monuments, including the Friendship Monument(ky) and the Monument to Revolutionary Heroes. In 1966, she became Chair of the Society for the Protection of Historical and Cultural Monuments, to promote conservation of cultural heritage in the country.

After her retirement from the Ministry, in 1980, Konduchalova continued her work with the Society for the Protection of Historical and Cultural Monuments. Among the many awards bestowed upon Kondychalova, she was honored with the Order of Lenin, twice received the Order of the Red Banner of Labour, and the Order of the Badge of Honour from the USSR. In her own country, she was knighted twice receiving the Order of Manas in both the 1st and 3rd degree. In 2010, she received the highest national honor, Hero of the Kyrgyz Republic with the special distinction "Ak-Shumkar", from President Roza Otunbayeva In 2011, Munduzbek Tentimishev published the biography Легендарлуу өмүр: Күлүйпа Кондучалова (Legendary Life: Kuluypa Konduchalova), dedicated to one of the few women who rose in political rank in her era.

== Death and legacy ==
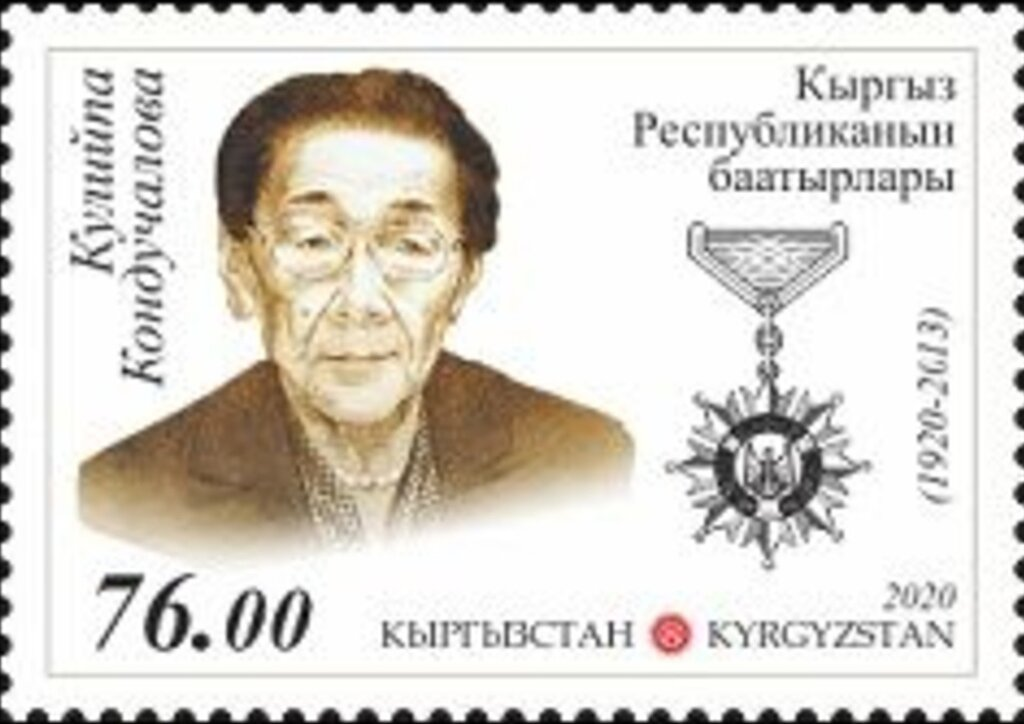
Konduchalova on a 2020 stamp of Kyrgyzstan

Konduchalova died on 7 September 2013 in Bishkek and was buried on 9 September in the Ala-Archa Cemetery.
