= Hero of the Kyrgyz Republic =

State decoration of Kyrgyzstan

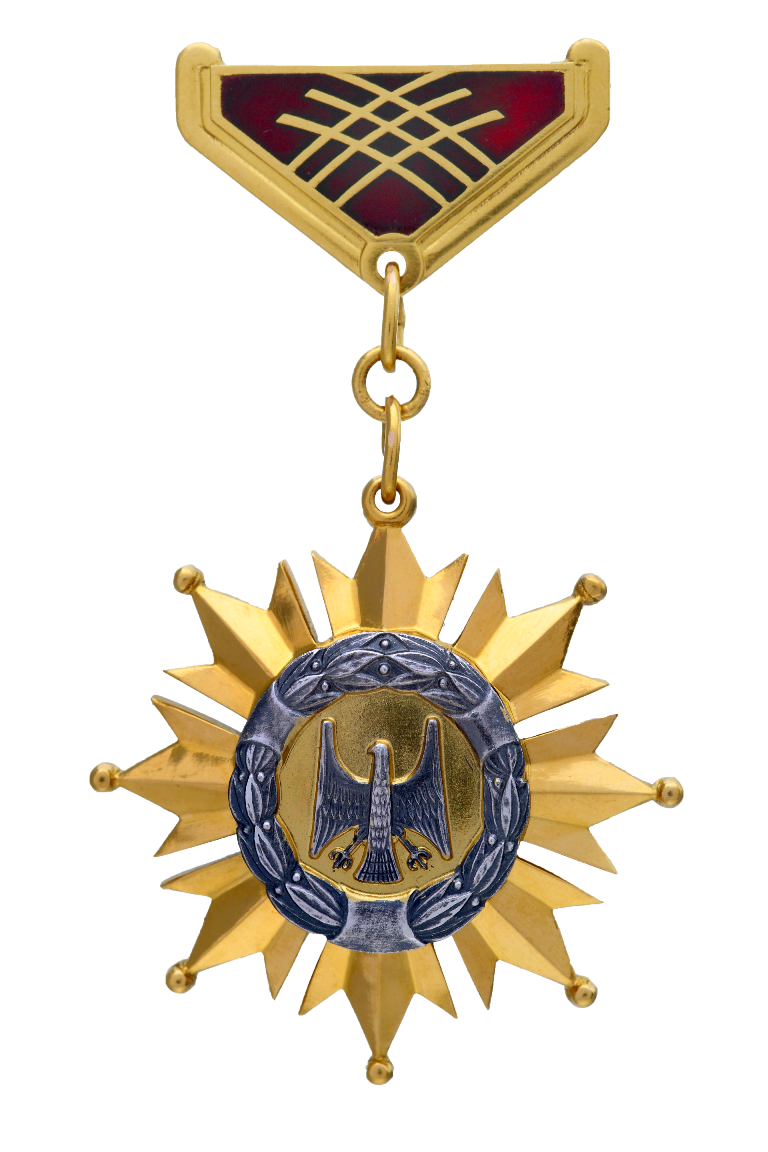
- Type: Award
- Awarded for: exceptional services to the state and people, the accomplishment of the heroic feat in the name of freedom and independence of the Kyrgyz Republic
- Presented by: Kyrgyzstan
- Established: April 16, 1996
- First award: February 4, 1997

Highlights
- Total: 24

The title Hero of the Kyrgyz Republic (Kyrgyz: Кыргыз Республикасынын Баатыры) is a state award of the Kyrgyz Republic. It was established on 16 April 1996 by the law "On the establishment of state awards of the Kyrgyz Republic". As of June 2014, 23 people have been awarded the title.

== Ak-Shumkar Medal ==
Once the title is conferred upon a person, they are presented with the Ak Shumkar («Ак-Шумкар») Medal and the corresponding certificate. It is worn on the left side of the chest above other orders and medals. The medal is made of gold and is a symmetrical star consisting of eight upper-level beams forming a circle with a diameter of 40 millimeters. The block is presented in the form of a tumar (an ancient Kyrgyz talisman), where a relief drawing of a tynduk is placed on a red field.

== Recipients ==
- Tugolbay Sydykbekov, the patriarch of Kyrgyz literature – February 4, 1997
- Chingiz Aitmatov, writer and public figure – February 4, 1997
- Turgunbay Sadykov, sculptor – February 4, 1997
- Salizhan Sharipov, Kyrgyz pilot-cosmonaut (for Russia) - February 3, 1998
- Turdakun Usubalijev, Leader of the Kirghiz SSR – October 14, 1999
- Sabira Kumushaliyeva, actress, People's Artist of the Kyrgyz Republic – August 22, 2000
- Akbaraly Kabaev, Kyrgyz construction manager – August 22, 2002
- Kurmanbek Arykov, Kyrgyz construction manager – August 22, 2002
- Asankhan Dzhumakhmatov, composer – January 26, 2003
- Mambet Mamakeev, Kyrgyz surgeon – November 24, 2004
- Absamat Masaliyev, Leader of the Kirghiz SSR – June 25, 2005
- Suyunbai Eraliev, poet – October 31, 2006
- Sooronbai Zhusuev, poet – February 16, 2007
- Tologon Kasymbek, writer – February 16, 2007
- Ernst Akramov, Kyrgyz surgeon and public figure – November 20, 2009
- Kuliyipa Konduchalova, prominent public figure – September 18, 2010
- Dooronbek Sadyrbaev, Kyrgyz film director, writer and public figure – October 27, 2010
- Iskhak Razzakov, party and state leader of the Kirghiz SSR – December 29, 2010
- Alisbek Alymkulov, Minister for Youth Affairs of the Kyrgyz Republic – August 28, 2011
- Mutalip Mamytov, Kyrgyz neurosurgeon – August 28, 2011
- Tashtanbek Akmatov, politician – March 12, 2013
- Jusup Mamay, People's Artist of the Kyrgyz Republic – May 30, 2014
- Almazbek Atambaev, former President of Kyrgyzstan – November 27, 2017
