= Jambyl (film) =

1953 film by Efim Dzigan

Dzhambul
- Directed by: Efim Dzigan
- Written by: Nikolai Pogodin; Abdilda Tazhibayev
- Starring: Shaken Ajmanov
- Cinematography: Nikolai Bolshakov; Igor Gelein
- Music by: Nikolai Kryukov; Mukan Tulebayev
- Production company: Alma Ata Studio
- Release date: 25 May 1953
- Running time: 85 minutes
- Country: Soviet Union
- Language: Russian

Jambyl is a 1953 Soviet drama film directed by Efim Dzigan.

The film tells about the life and work of the renowned Kazakh poet and aqyn, Jambyl Jabayev.

== Plot ==
In the vast Kazakh steppes, the young poet Jambyl lives and learns from the famous akyn Suyunbai. Before his death, Suyunbai entrusts his dombra to Jambyl. Despite flattery, gold, or persecution, Jambyl remains steadfast in his commitment to truth in his art. The Tsarist government arrests him to suppress his free voice. While in prison, Jambyl meets Vasily, a Russian soldier and Bolshevik. This encounter helps him realize that the Russian people and Kazakhs share the same aspirations.

As the years pass, Jambyl grows older, and his songs are heard less often. The news of the October Revolution reignites his creative spirit. Jambyl celebrates the newfound happiness of the people who have discovered a new light in life. He travels to Moscow, marvels at its beauty, and composes songs about the capital.

During the difficult days of Great Patriotic War, Jambyl sends his son to the front and encourages his fellow Kazakhs to strike back at the enemy who has attacked their Great Motherland. In besieged Leningrad, his famous song "Leningraders, My Children" resonates with hope. Together with his people, the poet lives to see Victory Day. Once again, the sound of the same dombra fills the air in his hands.

== Cast ==
- Shaken Aimanov as Jambyl
- Kurmanbek Dzhandarbekov as Kadyrbay
- G. Kurmangaliyev
- German Khovanov
- Kapan Badyrov
- Kh. Abugaliyeva as Alma
- Nurmukhan Zhanturin
- Kenenbai Kozhabekov
- Konstantin Adashevsky as Governor
- Yefim Kopelyan
- Semyon Derevyansky
- A. Dzhalumbetov
- Erast Garin
- Olesya Ivanova
- Yevgeny Lebersky
- A. Lukinov
- Vasili Merkuryev
- Nina Nikitina as Teacher
- Zhagda Oguzbayev
- A. Tashev
- N. Topalova
- Yeleubai Umurzakov as Suyumbay
- Amina Umurzakova

== Bibliography ==
- Lewytzkyj, Borys (1984). Who's who in the Soviet Union: A Biographical Encyclopedia of 5,000 Leading Personalities in the Soviet Union. K.G. Saur. ISBN 978-3-598-10467-1.
