= Roza Uchkempirova =

Kyrgyz economist

Roza Maveltovna Uchkempirova (born August 15, 1943) is a Kyrgyzstani economist and government official.

Uchkempirova is a native of Karakol. In 1965 she graduated from the Faculty of Economics at the Kyrgyzstan State University, and began to work at Taxi Fleet No. 1 in Frunze, today Bishkek. In 1970 she started graduate studies at the Institute of Economics of the Kyrgyz Academy of Sciences. From 1974 she was a research fellow at the State Planning Committee of the Kyrgyz SSR; four years later she became head of the Department of Optimization of Development and Location of Industry, then becoming head of the Department of Culture, Education and Health of the State Planning Committee of the Kyrgyz SSR. In December 1993 Uchkempirova took over the director-generalship of the Social Fund of the Kyrgyz Republic. She remained in the position when it converted to a chairmanship in 1994, and again in 1999 when it became a ministry. She continued at the Fund until February, 1999, when she resigned as minister over accusations of financial mismanagement. During her time there she worked on numerous plans related to education, pensions and health. Uchkempirova next became general director of Socium Consult Ltd in 2001, and returned to government as chair of the Supervisory Board at the Ministry of Health from 2011 until 2014. Since 2010 she concerned herself with efforts to refinance education in Kyrgyzstan, and spoke of a need to encourage transparency in government operations and reform the health care system of the country. Uchkempirova has two children: a son, born in 1965, and a daughter, born in 1970.
