= Heat (1963 film) =

- Russian: Зной
- Directed by: Larisa Shepitko
- Written by: Chingiz Aitmatov; Iosif Olshansky; Irina Povolotskaya; Larisa Shepitko; Semyon Lungin; Ilya Nusinov
- Starring: Bolotbek Shamshiyev; Nurmukhan Zhanturin; Klara Yusupzhanova; Kumbolot Dosumbayev; Darkul Kuyukova
- Cinematography: Vladimir Arkhangelskiy; Yuri Sokol
- Edited by: Lev Felonov
- Music by: Roman Ledenyov
- Release date: 1963
- Country: Soviet Union
- Language: Russian

Heat (Russian: Зной) is a 1963 Soviet drama film directed by Larisa Shepitko.

== Plot ==
The film tells the story of Kemel, a young recent school graduate who is sent by his mother to a small village in the Kazakh Steppe for a job. Kemel winds up doing water and field work there under strict direction from Abakir, the farm's authoritarian leader. His first day, he is introduced to several of the other workers and village folk, including Kalipa, Abakir's girlfriend. One day, Kemel accidentally leaves a water bucket behind during work in the morning, and runs off to retrieve it as to not further upset his older co-workers. He retraces his steps back to a stream, where a beautiful girl now relaxes. Kemel and the girl playfully smile to one another before he hastily returns to his post.

Kemel is constantly talked down to by Abakir, becoming dejected. Afterwards, he encounters the girl again. They joyfully ride along the mountainside and field together, simply laughing and having a fun time without even having to exchange words. When he comes back, Abakir immediately chastises Kemel for his idleness. Kemel tries standing up for himself, stating that Abakir barely treats his workers as humans, but Abakir just becomes more aggressive, and even Kalipa fails to calm him down. Kemel turns his back on Abakir and storms off. That night, Kalipa tries to tell Abakir to take it easy on Kemel and the other workers, but he brushes her off. This upsets Kalipa deeply, who has to forcefully convince herself that Abakir still loves her while fighting back tears. His treatment of her worsens, however, such as in one sequence where he demands that she undress herself in front of others.

Kemel runs into a different sect of workers who operate the water in the faraway fields. The workers are driving far across the fields, moving to expand their services. This encourages Kemel to not work the water cart as he usually does. This time, he works the plow with Abakir driving the trailer, who remorselessly overworks the both of them. Kemel goes to visit the girl from earlier, and the two burn weeds on the field. Kalipa remarks how the fiery sight is actually quite beautiful, though Abakir is slightly annoyed. In the morning, Kalipa lets Kemel plow over the ashes left behind from the burnt weeds, but when Abakir finds out, he hits Kalipa and runs after Kemel, set on stopping him. Abakir smugly plants himself in the vehicle's path, forcing Kemel to brake. A persistent Kemel almost doesn't, and nearly runs over Abakir until he chooses to halt at the last second.

One night, a number of the townspeople try listening to their radio in their communal shelter, but Abakir angrily tells them to turn it off. They refuse until he rushes over and shuts it off himself. After Kemel turns it back on which sparks another argument with Abakir, Abakir smashes the radio and takes off with his belongings. Kalipa snaps and takes it all out on Kemel, believing that his constant disputes are what made Abakir act out and leave. Abakir marches off into the distance, across the boundless fields. Kemel and the other villagers don't seem to know what to do, and simply watch him go.

== Production ==
The film is the debut feature of acclaimed Soviet director Larisa Shepitko. Temperatures reached up to 120 degrees Fahrenheit while filming, causing the film stock to melt at certain points. Shepitko came down with jaundice during production, but insisted she keep working. She was carried around on a stretcher at certain points during production so that she could continue working.

== Cast ==
- Bolotbek Shamshiyev as Kemel (as B. Shamshiyev)
- Nurmukhan Zhanturin as Abakir (as N. Zhanturin)
- Klara Yusupzhanova as Kalipa (as K. Yusupzhanova)
- Kumbolot Dosumbayev as Sheyshen (as K. Dosumbayev)
- Darkul Kuyukova as Aldey (as D. Kuyakova)
- K. Esyenov as Sadabek
- Roza Tabaldiyeva as Girl (as R. Tabaldiyeva)
- Sadykbek Dzhamanov as Dzhumash (as S. Dzhamanov)
