= Kerimbubu Shopokova =

Soviet era Kyrgyzstani farming collective

Kerimbubu Shopokova (Kyrgyz: Керимбүбү Шопокова) (6 (19) December 1917 – 23 December 2013) was a Kyrgyzstani collective farm worker of the Soviet era.

Shopokova was born in the Chuy Region of northern Kyrgyzstan. Her family was poor, and her father died before her first birthday. When she was thirteen her mother died as well, leaving her an orphan. She found employment in farm work, cultivating sugar beets; later she became the head of a farm herself. She was married, but widowed early; in 1941, after her husband died, she increased the yield of crops at the farm which she managed, all the while developing additional resources to assist the government in fighting World War II. After the war, she adopted five children; she was already looking after her own children and taking care of her husband's family. A member of the Communist Party of the Soviet Union, she attended the 21st Congress of the Communist Party of the Soviet Union in 1959. She retired from farm work in 1977. Shopokova received a number of awards during her career; in 1946 she was awarded the Order of Lenin, and in 1957 she received the Order of the Red Banner of Labour. In the same year she was named a Hero of Socialist Labour. She also received a diploma for "Excellence in Socialist Agriculture", and later she was awarded the Order of Manas by the government of Kyrgyzstan.
