= Alitet Leaves for the Hills =

- Russian: Алитет уходит в горы
- Directed by: Mark Donskoy
- Written by: Tikhon Syomushkin
- Starring: Andrei Abrikosov; Lev Sverdlin; Boris Tenin; Yuri Leonidov; Lenvlad Turkin
- Cinematography: Sergey Urusevskiy
- Music by: Lev Shvarts
- Release date: 1949
- Running time: 100 minute
- Country: Soviet Union

Alitet Leaves for the Hills (Russian: Алитет уходит в горы) is a 1949 Soviet war adventure film directed by Mark Donskoy.

== Plot ==
The inhabitants of Chukotka were cruelly exploited before the revolution. Once Chukotka was visited by the representative of the Kamchatka Revolutionary Committee Los and the ethnographer Zhukov. The news of the arrival of the Russians immediately dispersed along the coast. Contrary to the pressure of the American Thomson and the local "oligarch" Alitet in Chukotka, fair trade laws were established, as a result of which the Americans and Alitet left Chukotka.

== Starring ==
- Andrei Abrikosov as Nikita Sergeevich Los (as A. Abrikosov)
- Lev Sverdlin as Alitet (as L. Sverdlin)
- Boris Tenin as Charlie Thomson (as B. Tenin)
- Yuri Leonidov as Frank (as Yu. Leonidov)
- Lenvlad Turkin as Andrey Zhukov (as L. Turkin)
- Muratbek Ryskulov as Vaal (as M. Ryskulov)
- Kenenbai Kozhabekov as Aye (as K. Kozhebekov)
- Nurmukhan Zhanturin as Tomatuge (as N. Dzhanturin)
- Zana Zanoni as Rultyna (as Z. Zanoni)
- Gulfairus Ismailova as Tygrena (as G. Ismailova)
- B. Saraliyev as Yarak
- Ioakim Maksimov-Koshkinskiy as Shaman (as Ya. Maksimov-Koshkinskiy)
