= Order of Danaker =

Highest order of Kyrgyzstan

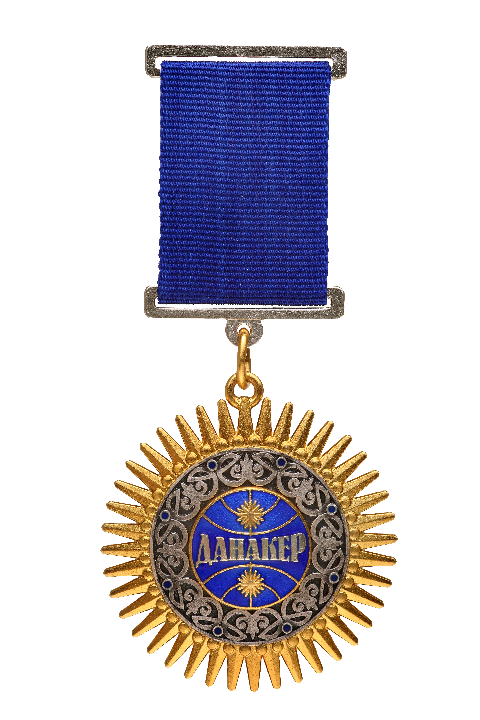
- Star of the order
- Type: State order
- Awarded for: Outstanding service to Kyrgyzstan
- Presented by: Kyrgyzstan
- Eligibility: Kyrgyz and foreign citizens
- Status: active
- Established: 24 November 1999
- First award: 26 August 2000
- Ribbon of the order

Precedence
- Next (higher): Order of Kurmanjan Datka

The Order of Danaker (Kyrgyz: Данакер ордени; Russian: Орден «Данакер»), literally the Order of Friendship is the highest order of Kyrgyzstan. The order is awarded by the President of Kyrgyzstan. Established in 1999, the order recognizes outstanding service to Kyrgyzstan.

== Statute of the Order ==
The Order of Danaker is awarded for significant contributions to strengthening peace, friendship, and cooperation between peoples, for particularly fruitful work in preserving interethnic harmony, for services to the development of science and the country's economic potential, for active work in bringing together and mutually enriching national cultures, and for strengthening friendly relations between states.

== Description of the Order ==
The Danaker Order is made of silver and is shaped like a star with forty evenly diverging rays, 42 mm in diameter. The rays of the star are plated with gold.

== Notable recipients ==
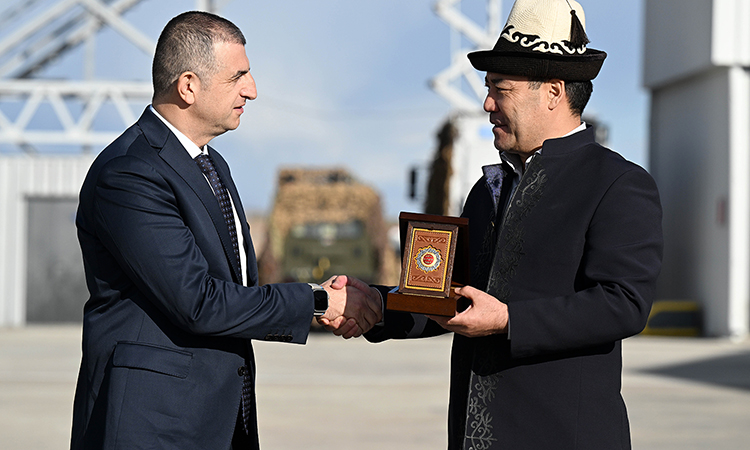
The Order of Danaker being awarded to Haluk Bayraktar, the CEO of Baykar, by the President Sadyr Japarov

- Osh
- Valery Gergiev
- Sergei Shoigu
- Sergey Lavrov
- Klaus Töpfer
- Yo-Yo Ma
- Kōichirō Matsuura
- Manfred Carstens
- Borys Paton
- Sepp Blatter
- Almazbek Atambayev
- Shavkat Mirziyoyev
- Dmitry Medvedev
- Abdygul Chotbaev
- Abdukhalim Raimjanov
- Recep Tayyip Erdoğan
- Sergey Lebedev
- Eugen Doga
- Ahmed Mohammed Ali Al-Madani
- Wang Yi
- Nikolai Ryzhkov
- Yevgeny Primakov
- Haluk Bayraktar
- Rustam Minnikhanov

== See also ==
- Orders, decorations, and medals of Kyrgyzstan
