= Oktyabr District, Bishkek =

Oktyabr District Октябрь району
- district
- Coat of arms

- Location within Kyrgyzstan
- Coordinates: 42°50′N 74°37′E
- Country: Kyrgyzstan
- Region: Bishkek City

Population (2009)
  - Total: 238,329

The Oktyabr District (Kyrgyz: Октябрь району, Russian: Октябрьский район) is a district of the capital city of Bishkek in northern Kyrgyzstan. Its resident population was 238,329 in 2009. It covers the southeastern part of the city, including the residential area Tokoldosh.

== Demographics ==
Historical populations in Oktyabr District
Year	Pop.	±% p.a.
1970	97,985	—
1979	134,300	+3.56%
1989	164,543	+2.05%
1999	216,402	+2.78%
2009	238,329	+0.97%
Note: resident population; Source:

=== Ethnic composition ===
According to the 2009 Census, the ethnic composition (residential population) of the Oktyabr District was:

Ethnic group	Proportion
Kyrgyzs	60.2%
Russians	28.1%
Tatars	1.9%
Koreans	1.8%
Uzbeks	1.6%
Uygurs	1.5%
Kazakhs	1.2%
Ukrainians	1.1%
other groups	2.6%
