= Bolot Beyshenaliyev =

Soviet cinematographer and actor

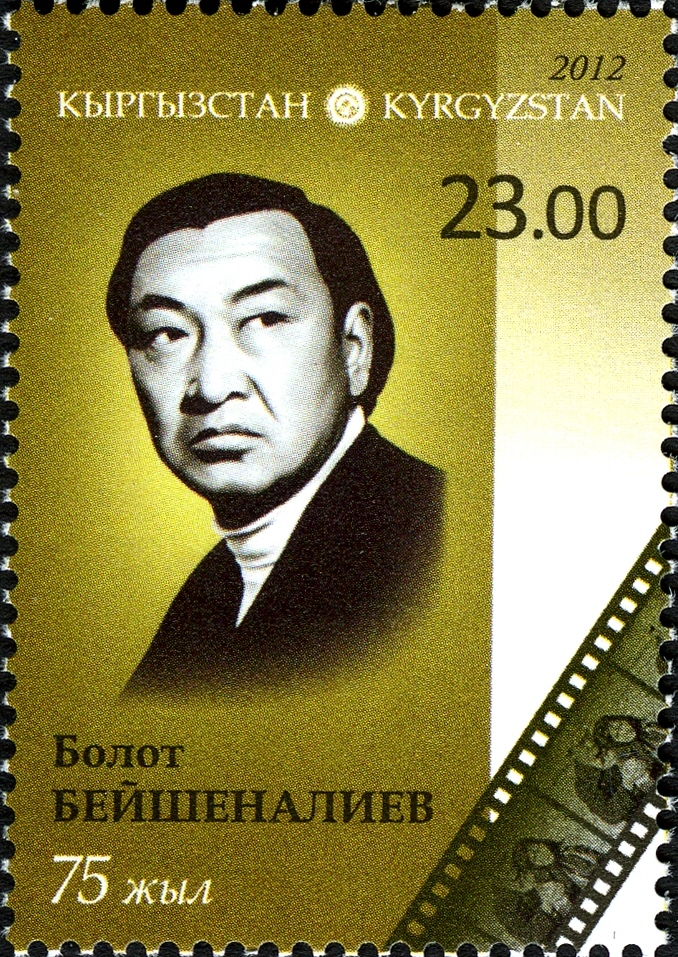
- Postage stamp for the 75th anniversary of the actor
- Born: June 25, 1937 village Kalmak-Ashuu, Kemin District, Kirghiz SSR, Soviet Union
- Died: November 18, 2002 (aged 65); Bishkek, Kyrgyzstan
- Occupation: Actor
- Years active: 1957–2002

Bolot Beishenaliev (Russian: Болот Бейшеналиев; June 25, 1937 – November 18, 2002) was a Soviet cinematographer, film and theater actor. People's Artist of Kyrgyzstan. Father of actor Aziz Beyshenaliyev.

Beyshenaliyev studied at the studio of the Kyrgyz State Theater of Opera and ballet, graduating in 1957, and at the Aleksandr Ostrovsky Institute of Theater Art in Tashkent until 1963. He subsequently worked as an assistant director at Kyrgyzfilm.

The actor's first starring role was of Duishen, in Andrei Konchalovsky's The First Teacher (1965), adapted from a novella by Chingiz Aitmatov. Beyshenaliev portrayed the passionate Bolshevik whose unshakeable convictions border on fanaticism. The international success of The First Teacher brought the actor several notable roles, among them the Tatarskiy khan in Andrei Tarkovsky's Andrei Rublev (1966) and the Red Army soldier Chingiz in Hungarian director Miklós Jancsó’s The Red and the White (1967).

Ali Khamraev cast Beyshenaliev in his controversial contemporary drama White, White Storks (1966). The actor subsequently appeared in dozens of Russian, Kyrgyz, Kazakh, Uzbek, Mongolian, and Czech films of all genres, often playing stoic men and occasionally heroic characters, for example, in the Ukrainian World War II blockbuster Where Is 042? as the Yakut survivor Nomokonov. Among Beyshenaliev's later roles are the lead in Ardak Amirkulov's historical epic The Fall of Otrar (1991) and the village senior in Aleksei Balabanov's Kafka adaptation The Castle (1994). His final performance was in Dalmira Tilepbergenova's short film The Falcon's Hood (2001) as a disillusioned old man who sells birds on the market.

== Selected filmography ==
- 1964 — White Mountains as brother
- 1965 — The First Teacher as teacher Duishen
- 1966 — White, White Storks as Qayyum
- 1966 — Andrei Rublev as Tatar khan
- 1967 — The Red and the White as Chingiz
- 1968/1972 — Liberation as tankman
- 1969 — The Lanfier Colony as Goupi-swineherd
- 1972 — The Seventh Bullet as deserter
- 1972 — Hot Snow as Kasymov
- 1977 — Mama, I'm Alive as Chingiz
- 1983 — Semyon Dezhnev as Sakhey
- 1984 — TASS Is Authorized to Declare... as Lao, Chinese advisor
- 1994 — The Castle as village headman
- 1999 — Mother as old northerner
