= The White Ship (1976 film) =

1976 film

- Ukrainian film poster
- Directed by: Bolotbek Shamshiyev
- Written by: Bolotbek Shamshiyev; Chingiz Aitmatov
- Starring: Nurgazy Sydygaliyev
- Cinematography: Manas Musayev
- Production company: Kyrgyzfilm
- Release date: June 1976
- Running time: 95 minutes
- Country: Soviet Union
- Language: Kyrgyz

The White Ship (Kyrgyz: Ак кеме, Russian: Белый пароход, romanized: Belyy parokhod) is a 1976 Soviet drama film directed by Bolotbek Shamshiyev, based on the novel with the same name by Chingiz Aitmatov. It was entered into the 26th Berlin International Film Festival.

== Cast ==
- Nurgazy Sydygaliyev as Boy
- Sabira Kumushaliyeva as Grandma
- Orozbek Kutmanaliyev as Uncle Orozkul
- Aiturgan Temirova as Gyuldzhamal
- Asankul Kuttubayev as Momun
