= Andrey Korjenkov =

Kyrgyzstani scientist

Andrey Korjenkov is a Kyrgyz seismologist and geologist.

Korjenkov is a member of the Kyrgyz Institute of Seismology and the Kyrgyz Academy of Sciences. One of his papers is based on his geological research into the Chong-Kemin Valley, entitled, "Long-Term Preservation of Paleoseismic Deformations as a Tool for Revealing Traces of Ancient Seismic Catastrophes".
