= Turdakun Usubaliev =

Soviet Kyrgyz politician (1919–2015)

Hero of the Kyrgyz Republic Turdakun Usubaliev
- Турдакун Усубалиев
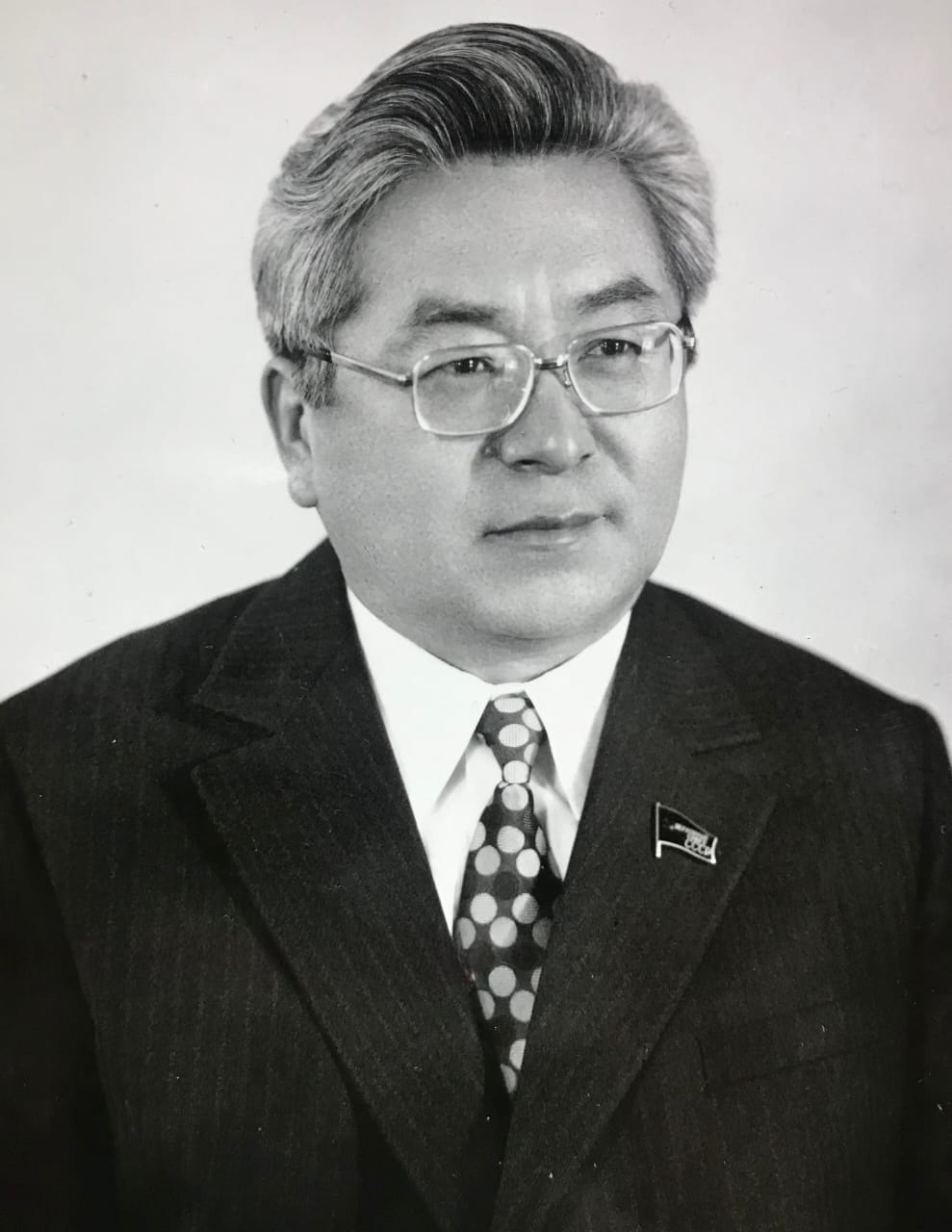

First Secretary of Communist Party of Kirghizia
- In office 9 May 1961 – 2 November 1985
- Preceded by: Iskhak Razzakov
- Succeeded by: Absamat Masaliyev

Personal details
- Born: 6 November 1919 Kochkor, Turkestan ASSR, Russian SFSR (now Kyrgyzstan)
- Died: 7 September 2015 (aged 95) Bishkek, Kyrgyzstan
- Resting place: Ala-Archa Cemetery
- Party: Communist Party of the Soviet Union; United Kyrgyzstan
- Spouse: Guljake Niyazalievna
- Children: 2 sons and 1 daughter
- Education: Kyrgyz National Institute; Moscow State Pedagogical University

Turdakun Usubaly uulu Usubaliev (Note: Kyrgyz: Турдакун Усубалы уулу Усубалиев; Russian: Турдакун Усубалиевич Усубалиев, romanized: Turdakun Usubaliyevich Usubaliyev) (6 November 1919 – 7 September 2015) was a Soviet and Kyrgyz politician who served as First Secretary of the Central Committee of the Communist Party of Kirghizia (Note: Kirghizia was a term historically used to refer to modern-day Kyrgyzstan until 1991, and it is today viewed as an archaism.) between 1961 and 1985.

== Biography ==
He was born in the peasant family of Usubala Kenensariev and Rapia Baigazieva in Kochkor. In 1941, he graduated from the Kyrgyz National Institute, and in 1955 the Moscow State Pedagogical University in absentia. In 1941, he was an activist of the Communist Party from 1941 to 1945, and a deputy head of department in the district committee, and the instructor of the Central Committee of Communist Party of Kirghizia. From 1945 to 1955, he was the instructor of the Central Committee of the CPSU, and from 1955 to 1956 editor of the newspaper of the Kirghiz Soviet Socialist Republic. From 1956 to 1958, he was the head of one of the departments of the Central Committee of the Communist Party of Kirghizia, and from 1958 to 1961, he was First Secretary of the Frunze City Committee of the Communist Party of Kirghizia. Then, from 9 May 1961 until his retirement on 2 November 1985, he was the First Secretary of the Central Committee of the Communist Party of Kirghizia. In June 2008 he was a co-founder of the political movement "Great Kyrgyzstan".

Usubaliev died in Bishkek in September 2015 at the age of 95.

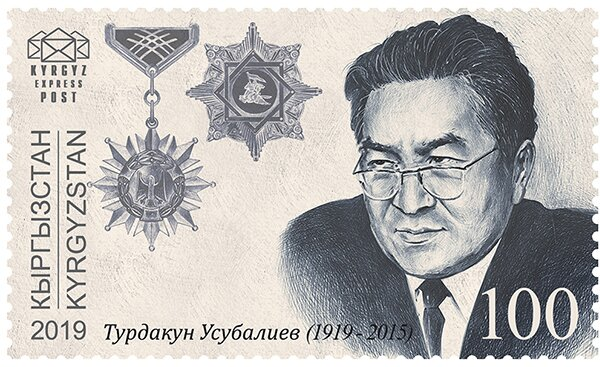
Usubaliev on a 2019 stamp of Kyrgyzstan

== Legacy ==
In 2020, Old Square was officially renamed Turdakun Usubaliev Square in honor of the long-serving First Secretary of the Communist Party of Kirghizia. In 2026, there were proposals to rename his hometown of Kochkor after Usubaliev.

== Awards and titles ==
- Hero of the Kyrgyz Republic (October 14, 1999)
- Order of Manas, 1st degree (February 4, 1997)
- Order of Friendship (September 25, 1999, Russia)
- 4 Orders of Lenin (1964, November 5, 1969, 1976, November 6, 1979)
- Order of the October Revolution (1979)
- 2 Orders of the Red Banner of Labor (1964, ?)
- Medal "For Valiant Labor in the Great Patriotic War of 1941-1945
- Medal "In Commemoration of the 100th Anniversary of the Birth of Vladimir Ilyich Lenin"
- Medal "For Distinction in Guarding the State Border of the USSR"
- Medal "For the Development of Virgin Lands"
- 7 Gold medals of VDNKh
- Honorary Citizen of the City of Bishkek

== Personal life ==
His wife was Guljake Niyazalievna Usubalieva (1920-2000). He had three children: a son Syrgak (1946-2007), a son Yesenkul (1948-2019), and daughter Bermet (born in 1958).

== Notes ==
Political offices
Preceded by Iskhak Razzakov	First Secretary of the Communist Party of Kirghizia; 1961 – 1985	Succeeded by Absamat Masaliyev
