= Nurmukhan Zhanturin =

Soviet actor and film director

- Нұрмұхан Сейтахметұлы Жантөрин
- Born: 22 April 1928; Village Kondaurovo, Makhambet District, Atyrau Region, Kazakh ASSR
- Died: May 2, 1990 (aged 62); Almaty, Kazakh SSR
- Occupations: Actor, director
- Years active: 1948–1990
- Works: Kazakh State Academic Drama Theater named after M.O. Auezov

Nurmukhan Seitakhmetovich Zhanturin (Kazakh: Нұрмұхан Сейтахметұлы Жантөрин; April 22, 1928 — May 2, 1990) was a Soviet and Kazakh stage and film actor and director, People's Artist of the Kazakh SSR (1966).

== Biography ==
Nurmukhan Zhanturin was born in the settlement of Kondaurovo, Guriev Region (now known as Atyrau Region, Kazakhstan) on April 22, 1928. At the age of 14 he started working as an operator's assistant in a Guriev oil prospecting group, and later attended motion picture operator courses in Alma-Ata. He graduated from Alma-Ata Movie School in 1950 and the Acting Dept. of the Ostrovsky Institute of Performing Arts (Tashkent) in 1952 and soon joined Auezov Theater. His first screen roles go back to 1948, while 1967 saw Zhanturin officially employed at Kazakhfilm Studios. He returned to the theater in 1988 and continued to work there until his death in 1990.

Zhanturin's best-known roles include Chokan Valikhanov (eponymous play by Sabit Mukanov), Kodar (Kozy Korpesh — Bayan Sulu by Gabit Musirepov), Kebek and Syrym (Enlik-Kebek and Karakoz by Mukhtar Auezov), Arman (One Tree Does Not Make a Forest by Abdilda Tazhibaev), Kaben (Unquenchable Fire by Zeinulla Kabdulov), Sanzhan (Unfunny Comedy by Akim Tarazi), Doctor (The Forgotten Man by Nâzım Hikmet), Sintaro (A Woman's Life by Kaoru Morimoto), Molière (The Cabal of Hypocrites by Mikhail Bulgakov), as well as Iago and Macbeth in Shakespeare's Othello and Macbeth (the latter in a production at the Seifullin Theater in Karaganda).

Mark Donskoy spotted Zhanturin's talent when scouting the Central Asia for actors for his movie Alitet Leaves for the Hills (after a 1950 novel by Syomushkin). Nurmukhan played the role of a young man named Tumatuge. This first screen role paved his way to popularity. Nurmukhan's other well-known roles included Kerim (Daughter of the Steppes, 1954), Dzhoomart (Saltanat, 1955), Alzhanov (On the Wild Coast of the Irtysh, 1959), Abakir (Heat, 1962), Tagay (Dzhura, 1964), Tanabay (The Trotter's Gait, 1968), Ablaykhanov (The End of the Ataman, 1970), Kurmangazy (Kurmangazy, 1974). He first appeared as Shoqan Walikhanov in the 1957 movie His Time Will Come (directed by Mazhit Begalin). Zhanturin's eponymous role in Sultan Baybars brought him a prize for Special Achievements in Acting (shared with Nonna Mordyukova) at Sozvezdie-90 USSR national festival. He performed a total of more than 50 roles on screen.

== Stage career ==
Auezov Theater (actor):

- 1952 — The Land in Bloom;
- 1953 — Kozy Korpesh;
- 1953 — Silk Suzani;
- 1954 — Love at Dawn;
- 1954 — The Taming of the Shrew;
- 1955 — Farhad and Shirin;
- 1955 — Amangeldy;
- 1955 — Envy;
- 1956 — Chokan Valikhanov;
- 1957 — Enlik-Kebek;
- 1958 — One Tree Does Not Make a Forest;
- 1959 — What Would You Do?;
- 1960 — The Start of an Era;
- 1961 — Saule;
- 1962 — The Fourth;
- 1962 — Abai;
- 1962 — You Are the Song I Long For;
- 1963 — Karagoz;
- 1963 — Like-Minded People;
- 1964 — Mother's Field;
- 1964 — Othello;
- 1964 — Little Tragedies;
- 1965 — Forgotten By Everyone;
- 1966 — A Woman's Life;
- 1967 — Unfunny Comedy;
- 1980, 1988 — The Cabal of Hypocrites (Molière);
- 1980, 1988 — Goodbye, Wolfhound!.

Director:

- 1961 — Marriage.

== Filmography ==
Year	Title	Original title			
Year	Title	Original title	Director	Role	Notes
1948	Alitet Leaves for the Hills	Алитет уходит в горы		Tomatuge	
1952	Jambyl	Джамбул		Murat	
1954	Daughter of the Steppes	Дочь степей		Kerim Sattarov	
1954	A Poem About Love	Поэма о любви		Kodar	
1955	The First Echelon	Первый эшелон		Kurbanov	
1955	Saltanat	Салтанат		Dzhoomart	
1958	His time will come	Его время придёт		Shokan Valikhanov	
1958	We are from the Semirechye	Мы из Семиречья		Dosov	
1958	Squall	Шквал		Darybaev	
1959	On the Wild Coast of the Irtysh	На диком бреге Иртыша		Alzhanov	
1959	One night	Однажды ночью		Shaltay Demesinov	
1962	Heat	Зной		Abakir	
1964	Dzhura	Джура		Tagay	
1965	The most obedient	Самая послушная		Tashimov	
1965	Chinara on the Rock	Чинара на скале		Ilyas	
1968	Road of a thousand miles	Дорога в тысячу вёрст		Sardarbek	
1970	The end of the Chieftain	Конец атамана		Ablaykhanov	
1970	Extraordinary Commissioner	Чрезвычайный комиссар		Salim Kurbashi	
1971	Listen on the other side	Слушайте на той стороне		Kamatsubara	
1971	Nomadic front	Кочующий фронт		Lopsan Chamza	
1972	The Seventh Bullet	Седьмая пуля		Kurbashi	
1972	Forest Ballad	Лесная баллада	✓		
1973	Where the white mountains are	Там, где горы белые...		Myrzagali	
1974	Kurmangazy	Курмангазы		Kurmangazy	
1975	Arman	Арман		old man Chodron	
1976	The third side of the coin	Третья сторона медали	✓		
1978	Treasure of the Black Mountains	Клад чёрных гор	✓		
1981	Provincial romance	Провинциальный роман		player	
1982	White Shaman	Белый шаман		Ryrka	
1982	Native steppes	Родные степи		Sultan	
1983	The Invincible	Непобедимый		Ustus Djuma	
1984	Fiery Roads	Огненные дороги		Buzrukbai	
1984	The Invincible	Непобедимый		Ustus Djuma	
1986	Golden woman	Золотая баба		Evdya	
1987	Prince Daniel Galitsky	Даниил — князь Галицкий		Batu Khan	
1989	Dune	Бархан		Askar	
1989	Sultan Beybars	Султан Бейбарс		Beybars-Sultan	

== Family ==
Margarita Zhanturina (Iovleva) – spouse;

2 daughters: Zhanna Zhanturina is a well-known art historian in Kazakhstan, and Bakhyt Zhanturina, Doctor of Philology.

== Awards and honours ==
- Order of the Red Banner of Labour (1959) — for outstanding achievements in the development of Kazakh art and literature and in conjunction with the ten-day festival of Kazakh art and literature in Moscow;
- Order of Friendship of Peoples (1988);
- People's Artiste of the Kazakh SSR (1966);
- State Award of the Kazakh SSR;

== Legacy ==
- Atyrau Regional Philharmonic Hall named after Nurmukhan Zhanturin (Atyrau, 1966);
- Regional Theater of Music and Drama named after Nurmukhan Zhanturin (Aktau, 2003);
- Nurmukhan Zhanturin monument in Aktau (2018);
- Sculptures to Asanali Ashimov, Khadisha Bokeeva, Sabira Maikanova and Nurmukhan Zhanturin were installed in front of Makhambet Academic Theater of Drama in Atyrau (2020). The group is called 'Creative Discussion'.
