= Tokoldosh =

Tokoldosh Токольдош
- Location within Kyrgyzstan
- Coordinates: 42°51′55″N 74°38′34″E
- Country: Kyrgyzstan
- Region: Bishkek City
- District: Oktyabr District
- Elevation: 788 m (2,585 ft)

Tokoldosh is a housing estate in Bishkek, the capital of Kyrgyzstan. It is part of the Oktyabr District.

Tokoldosh was not always part of Bishkek. The film actress Darkul Kuyukova's elder brother invented the phrase the "Four Daughters of Tököldösh" which associated his sister and three others with their birthplace. The other three were Sabira Kumushaliyeva, Baken Kydykeyeva, and Saira Kiyizbaeva.
