= Vladimir Ploskikh =

Kyrgyz archaeologist and historian

- Born: Vladimir Mikhailovich Ploskikh; 10 April 1937; Astana, Kazakh SSR, USSR
- Died: 31 July 2025 (aged 88); Bishkek, Kyrgyzstan
- Education: Kyrgyz National University
- Occupations: Archaeologist, historian

Vladimir Mikhailovich Ploskikh (10 April 1937 – 31 July 2025) was a Kyrgyz archaeologist and historian. A member of the Kyrgyz Academy of Sciences, he was a recipient of the Order of Manas (2003).

Ploskikh died on 31 July 2025 in Bishkek, at the age of 88.
