= Zhambyl Zhabayuly =

Qazaq poet (1846–1945)

Jambyl Jabaiūly
- Жамбыл Жабайұлы; Джамбул Джабаев
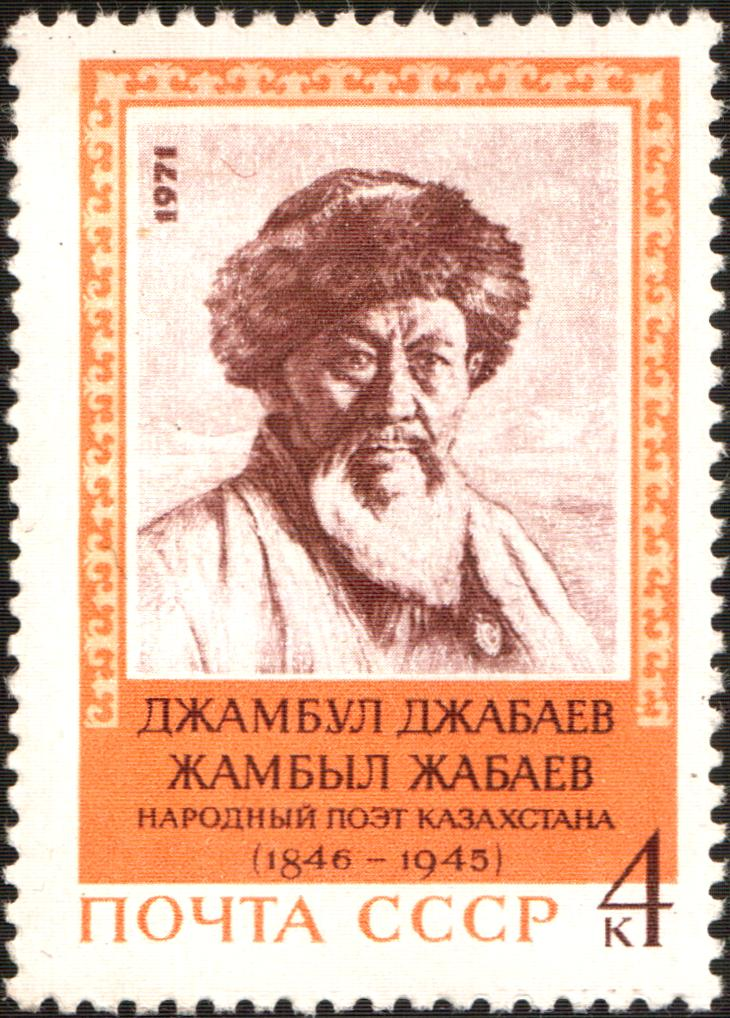
- 1971 stamp of the Soviet Union depicting Jambyl
- Born: 28 February 1846; Betpak-Dala, Qazaq Khanate
- Died: 22 June 1945 (aged 99); Almaty, Qazaq SSR, Soviet Union
- Occupations: aqyn; poet
- Writing career
- Years active: 1979–1945?

Jambyl Jabaiūly (Note: Often transliterated as Zhambyl Zhabayev through a Russified Romanization of Жамбыл Жабаев.) (Note: Jambyl's name was spelled and transliterated as Dzhambul Dzhabayev during the Soviet era. Nowadays, the Qazaq-oriented modern spelling, Zhambyl Zhabayev is used in Russian.) (Note: English: /dʒæmˈbɪl dʒəˈbaɪʊˌli/ jam-BIL jə-BY-uul-EE; Kazakh: Жамбыл Жабайұлы, IPA: [ʒɑmb̥ə́ɫ ʒɑβɑ́jʊɫə́]) (28 February 1846 – 22 June 1945) was a Soviet and Qazaq aqyn.

== Biography ==
According to a family legend, his mother, Ūldan, gave birth to him near Mount Jambyl, close to the headwaters of the Shu River while fleeing an attack on her village. His father, Jabai, then named his son after the mountain.

As a boy, Jambyl learned how to play the dombra and at age 14, left his home to become an aqyn. He learned the art of improvisation from the aqyn Suyunbai Aronuly. Jambyl sang exclusively in the Qazaq language.

Many patriotic, pro-revolution, and pro-Stalin poems and songs were attributed to Jambyl in the 1930s and were widely circulated in the Soviet Union.

Jambyl Jabaiūly died on 22 June 1945, at age 99. He was buried in Almaty, in a garden which he cultivated with his own hands.

The Kazakh city of Taraz was named after Jambyl from 1938 to 1997. Jambyl Region, in which Taraz is located, still bears his name.

== Authorship controversy ==
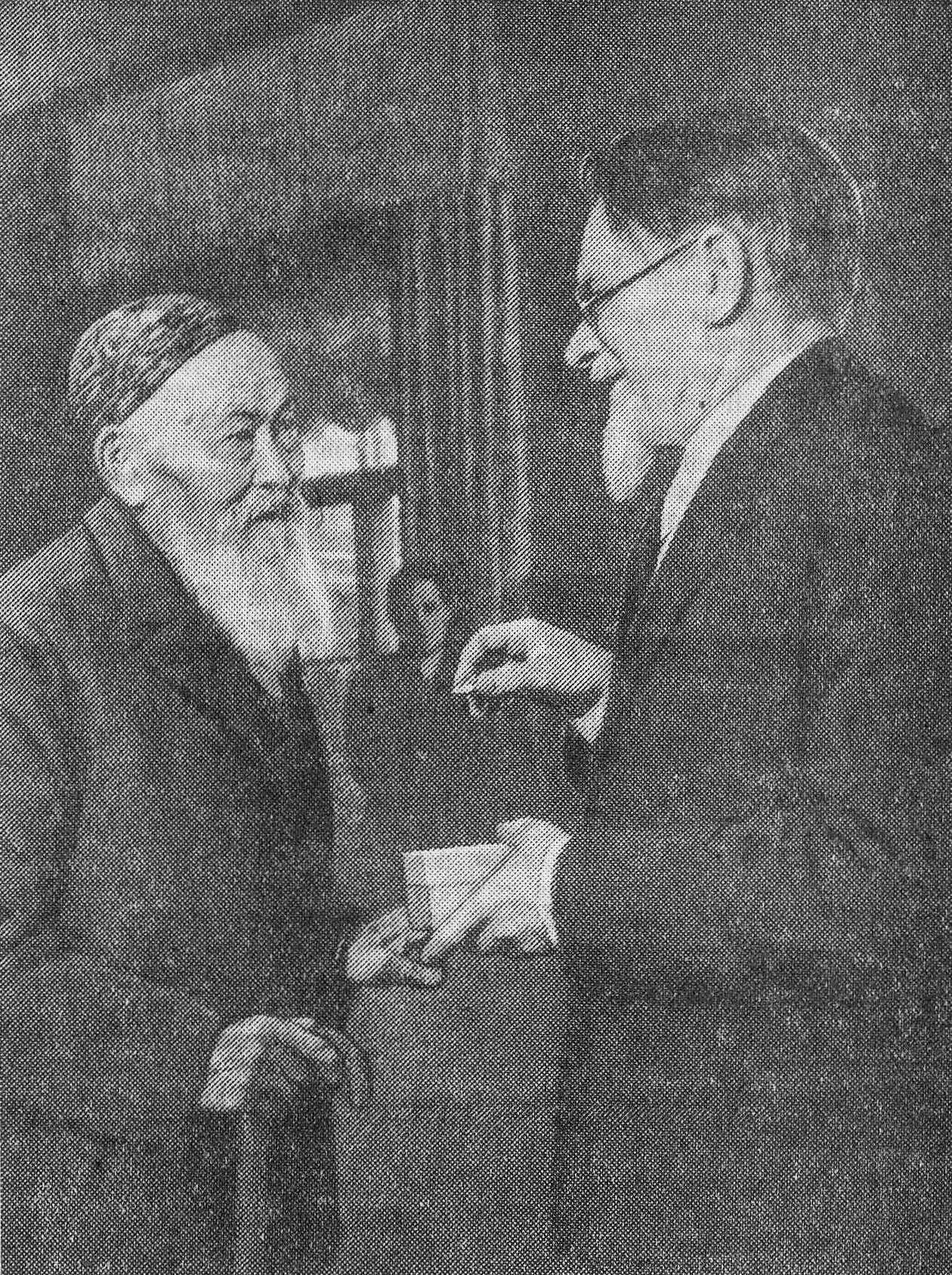
Jambyl is awarded the Order of Lenin by Mikhail Kalinin in Moscow, December 1938

It has been claimed that the authors of Jambyl's published poems were actually Russian poets, who were officially credited as "translators."

Poet Andrey Aldan-Semenov claimed that he was the "creator" of Jambyl, when in 1934, he was given the task by the Communist Party to find an aqyn. Aldan-Semenov found Jambyl on the recommendation of the collective farm chairman, the only criterion of choice was that the aqyn be poor and have many children and grandchildren. After Aldan-Semenov's arrest, other "translators" wrote Jambyl's poems.

In a different account, according to the Kazakh journalist Erbol Qurmanbaev, Jambyl was an aqyn of his clan, but until 1936 was relatively unknown. In that year, a young talented poet Äbdilda Täjibaev "discovered" Jambyl. He was directed to do this by the First Secretary of the Communist Party of Kazakhstan, Levon Mirzoyan, who wanted to find an aqyn similar to Suleyman Stalsky, the Dagestani poet. Täjibaev then published the poem "My Country", under Jambyl's name. It was translated into Russian by the poet Pavel Kuznetsov, published in the newspaper "Pravda" and was a success. After that, a group of his "secretaries", the young Kazakh poets, worked under Jambyl's name. In 1941-1943, they were joined by the Russian poet Mark Tarlovsky.

== Films ==
Films dedicated to Jambyl include:

1. Jambyl (1953) by director Efim Dzigan.
2. Jambyl: The Great Singer of Mankind (1994), documentary by director Kalila Umarov.
3. Jambyl. A New Era (2024)
