= Baken Kydykeyeva =

Kyrgyzstani actress

- Бакен Кыдыкеева
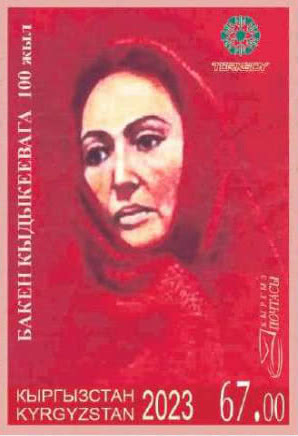
- Kydykeyeva on a 2023 Kyrgyz stamp
- Born: 20 September 1923; Tokoldosh, Turkestan ASSR, Soviet Union
- Died: 30 December 1993 (aged 70); Bishkek, Kyrgyzstan
- Occupation: Actress

Baken Kydykeyeva (Note: Kyrgyz: Бакен Кыдыкеева, romanized: Baken Kydykeeva; Russian: Бакен Кыдыкеева, romanized: Baken Kydykeyeva) (20 September 1923 – 30 December 1993) was a Kyrgyz actress.

== Life ==
She was born in 1920 or 23 and she is associated with Tokoldosh in Bishkek.

She made her debut at the Young Spectators Theatre at the age of 16. Five years later, she joined the Naryn Regional Theatre, and subsequently the Kyrgyz National Theatre. She played a major role in the 1955 picture Saltanat, followed by Toktogul in 1959, The First Teacher in 1965, and The Milky Way in 1967. She was a recipient of the People’s Artist of the USSR in 1970.

The film actress Darkul Kuyukova's elder brother invented the phrase the "Four Daughters of Tököldösh" which associated his sister and three others with their birthplace. The other three were Kydykeyeva, Sabira Kumushaliyeva and Saira Kiyizbaeva.
