= Mother (1999 Russian film) =

- Directed by: Denis Yevstigneyev
- Screenplay by: Arif Aliyev
- Produced by: Igor Tolstunov; Denis Yevstigneyev; Konstantin Ernst
- Starring: Nonna Mordyukova; Oleg Menshikov; Vladimir Mashkov; Yevgeny Mironov; Aleksei Kravchenko
- Cinematography: Pavel Lebeshev; Sergey Kozlov
- Edited by: Natalia Kucherenko
- Music by: Eduard Artemyev
- Production companies: NTV Profit; Russian Project Studio; Channel One Russia
- Release date: 31 March 1999
- Running time: 100 minutes
- Country: Russia
- Language: Russian
- Budget: $3,000,000

Mother (Russian: Мама, romanized: Mama) is a 1999 Russian feature film based on the capture of the Ovechkin family in 1988.

== Plot ==
This story began a long time ago. Having lost her husband, who was imprisoned for stealing coal and was killed during the escape, Polina, the mother of six children, was left without any support. To make ends meet, Polina founded a family folk music ensemble. Soon, however, she realizes that her children were worthy of a better fate, and she makes a desperate decision to escape the Soviet Union by hijacking the commercial airliner the family was traveling aboard.

Fifteen years later, Polina is released from prison to learn that fate has scattered her children all over the country: one is illegally fighting in a bar, another is chopping coal in the Donbas. Her oldest, Leonid, is still in a psychiatric hospital, having pretended to be mentally ill for 15 years to avoid prosecution for the hijacking.

In the final scenes, Polina again gathers her sons to free their elder brother from the hospital.

== Cast ==
- Nonna Mordyukova as Polina
  - Yelena Panova as young Polina
- Oleg Menshikov as Leonid
- Vladimir Mashkov as Nikolay
- Yevgeny Mironov as Pavel
- Aleksei Kravchenko as Vasily
- Mikhail Krylov as Yuri
- Maksim Sukhanov as special hospital's head
- Nikolai Chindyajkin as head physician
- Andrei Panin as father
- Pavel Lebeshev as icebreaker's captain
- Roman Madyanov as sergeant
- Bolot Beyshenaliyev as old northerner
- Natalia Soldatova as Stewardess

== Awards and nominations ==
Winner

- Honfleur Festival of Russian Cinema — Audience Award (Denis Yevstigneyev)
- Kinotavr — Best Music (Eduard Artemyev)

Nominee

- Nika Award — Best Music (Eduard Artemyev)
- Russian Guild of Film Critics — Best Actress (Nonna Mordyukova)
- Kinotavr — Full-Length Film
- Tokyo International Film Festival — Tokyo Grand Prix
