= Jusup Mamay =

Jüsüp Mamay جۉسۉپ ماماي
- Born: April 18, 1918; Akqi County, Xinjiang Province, Republic of China
- Died: June 1, 2014 (aged 96)
- Citizenship: People's Republic of China
- Occupations: Manaschi, bard
- Known for: Performing the whole of Manas

Jüsüp Mamay (Kyrgyz: جۉسۉپ ماماي, Chinese: 居素甫·玛玛宜, April 18, 1918 – June 1, 2014) was a Kyrgyz artist and narrator of the national epic Manas. He was born in Akqi County, Xinjiang Province, Republic of China. Among the Manas performers in the latter half of the 20th century, he was the only one to perform Manas in 8 parts and 230,000 lines.

For his special contribution to the preservation of this epic and other epic works, the Kyrgyz republic awarded him with Hero of the Kyrgyz Republic in 2014.
