= Musa Adyshev =

Soviet and Kyrgyz geologist

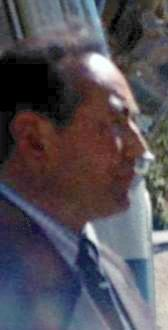
- 1978
- Born: Musa Mirzapayazovich Adyshev; June 15, 1915; Gulcha, Alay District, Osh Province
- Died: January 1, 1979 (aged 63)

Signature
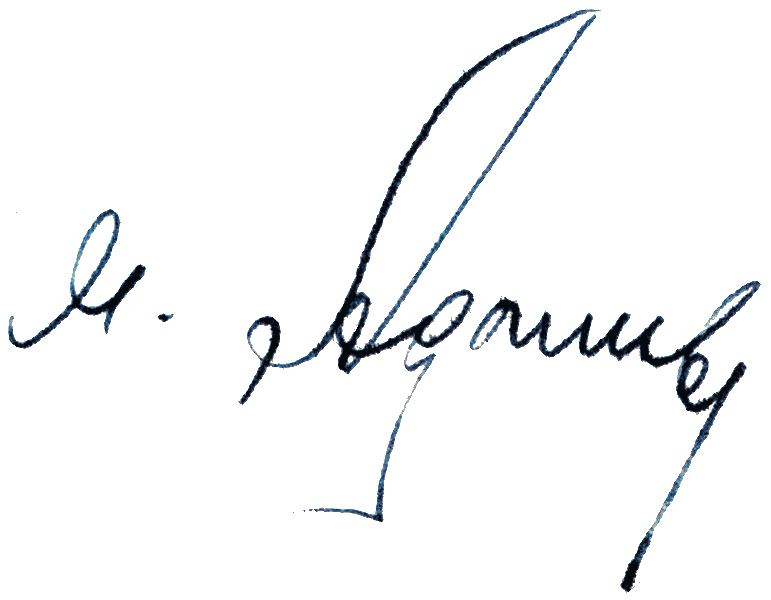

Musa Mirzapayazovich Adyshev (Kyrgyz: Myca Мирзапаяз уулу Адышев) was a Soviet and Kyrgyz geologist who lived and worked in Kyrgyzstan. He is best known for identification of Tien Shan black-shale province and substantiation of its stratigraphic location.

== Biography ==
After graduation from Central Asian State University in Tashkent in 1947 he worked in the Institute of Geology of Kyrgyz branch of Academy of Sciences of the Soviet Union.

In 1953-1974 he was a director of the Institute of Geology, in 1957-1979 - member of Board, since 1974 - vice president, and in 1978 the president of the Academy of Sciences of Kyrgyz SSR (presently Kyrgyz Academy of Sciences).

== Legacy and honors ==
Organizations named after academician M.Adyshev

- Institute of Geology of the Kyrgyz Academy of Science
- In 2004 Osh Technological Institute

Geographic places

- Range and peak in southern Kyrgyzstan
