= The First Teacher =

- Directed by: Andrei Konchalovsky
- Written by: Andrei Konchalovsky; Chinghiz Aitmatov; Boris Dobrodeev
- Starring: Bolot Beyshenaliyev; Natalya Arinbasarova
- Cinematography: Georgy Rerberg
- Edited by: Eva Ladyzhenskaya
- Music by: Vyacheslav Ovchinnikov
- Production companies: Mosfilm; Kyrgyzfilm
- Release date: 1965
- Running time: 102 minutes
- Country: Soviet Union
- Language: Russian

The First Teacher (Russian: Первый учитель, romanized: Pervyy uchitel) is a 1965 Ostern film directed by Andrei Konchalovsky. It is his first full-length work, based on the book by Chinghiz Aitmatov.

== Synopsis ==
The action takes place in the years following the October Revolution and Russian Civil War in the Kirghiz Soviet Socialist Republic, which is now Kyrgyzstan.

Young Komsomol member and a former Red Army soldier, Dyuyshen, travels to a remote village where he takes up his post as the new teacher for the children of the village. His enthusiasm immediately faces opposition from the village’s parents who look unfavorably on the idea, and difficulty with engaging the children in their learning, admonishing a young student for asking if Lenin will one day die.

Dyuyshen meets Altynai, an illiterate girl who is keen to study, but whose aunt is reluctant to allow her. After her uncle gives his blessing, Altynai starts attending school and forms a close friendship with Dyuyshen.

Altynai is later wedded to a powerful and wealthy chieftain against her will. Dyuyshen is beaten by her new husband and Altynai is kidnapped and taken away from the village. With the help of Soviet authorities, Dyuyshen locates Altynai and brings her back to the village, where both are hounded by the locals for bringing dishonor to the community.

An elder villager called Kartybay admonishes Dyuyshen for his lack of sensitivity to, and education of, local customs. For her safety, Dyuyshen arranges for Altynai to be taken to Tashkent to be schooled.

Returning to the village once more, Dyuyshen finds the school has burned down. The villagers force him to leave, but before doing so, he begins felling an ancient poplar tree and vows to build a new school.

== Cast ==
- Bolot Beyshenaliyev as The school teacher Dyuyshen
- Natalya Arinbasarova as Altynay
- Idris Nogajbayev as Narmagambet
- Darkul Kuyukova as Koltynay
- Kirey Zharkimbayev as Kartynbay
- Baken Kydykeeva as Chernukha
- Sovetbek Dzhumadylov as Kaimbay

== Prizes and awards ==
- Silver medal and Volpi Cup for Best Actress to Venice Film Festival (1966) - Natalia Arinbasarova
- Jussi Award for Best Foreign Director, Finland, 1973
