= Panfilov Street, Bishkek =

Street in Bishkek, Kyrgyzstan

Panfilov Street
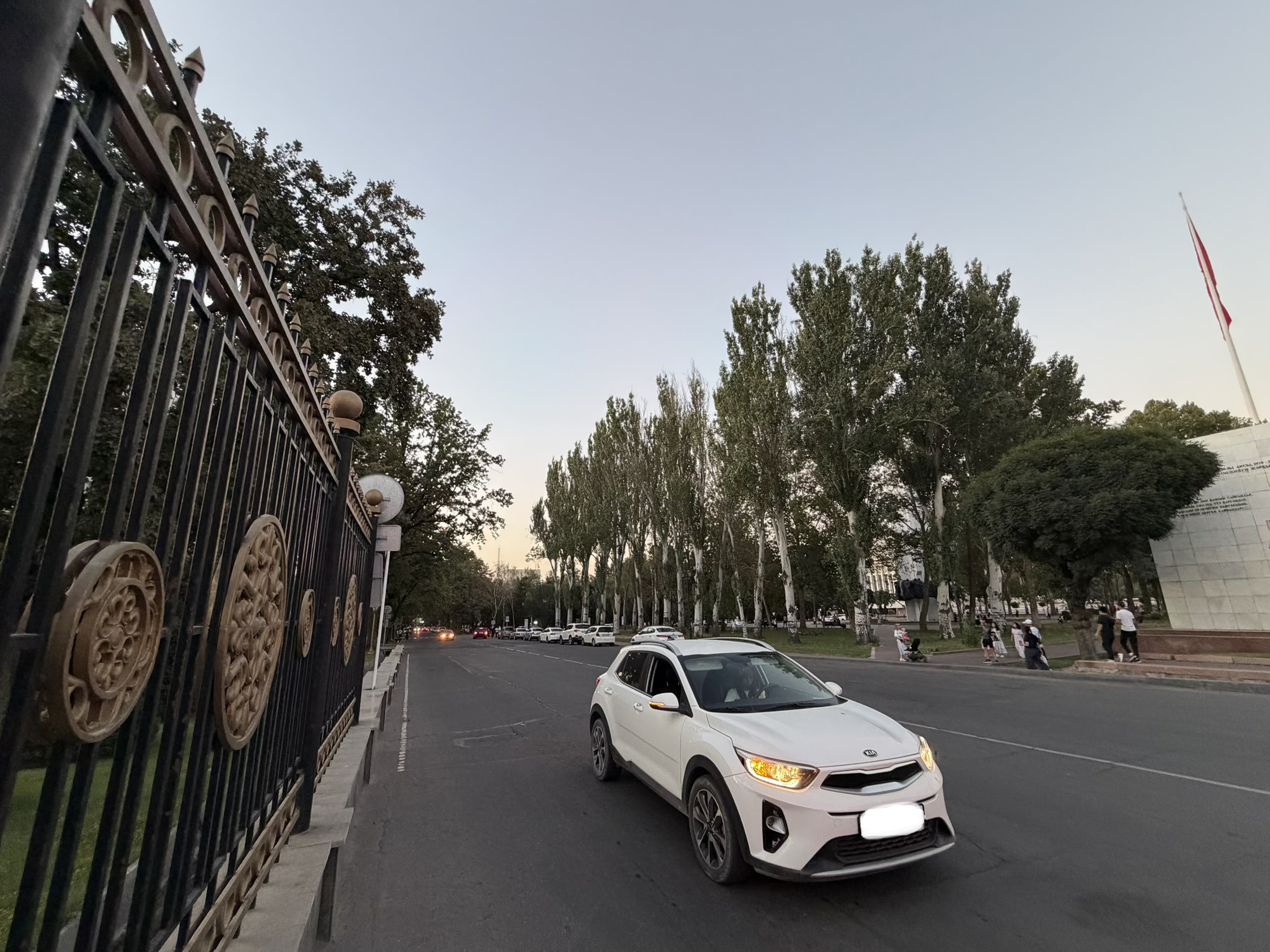
- Interactive map of Panfilov Street
- Native name: Панфилов көчөсү (Kyrgyz); улица Панфилова (Russian)
- Former name: Sadovaya Street
- Location: Bishkek
- Coordinates: 42.8710°N 74.6007°E
- Major junctions: Chüy Prospekti

Other
- Known for: Kyrgyz Drama Theater, Supreme Council building, Panfilov Park

Panfilov Street (Kyrgyz: Панфилов көчөсү, romanized: Panfilov köchösü; Russian: улица Панфилова) is a street in Bishkek, Kyrgyzstan. It stretches from Abdylas Maldybaev Street in the south to Jibek Jolu Prospekti in the north. The street was named after Soviet general Ivan Panfilov in 1941. Its earlier name was Sadovaya Street (Garden Street), originating from the Kazenniy Sad (Public Garden).
