= Orders, decorations, and medals of Kyrgyzstan =

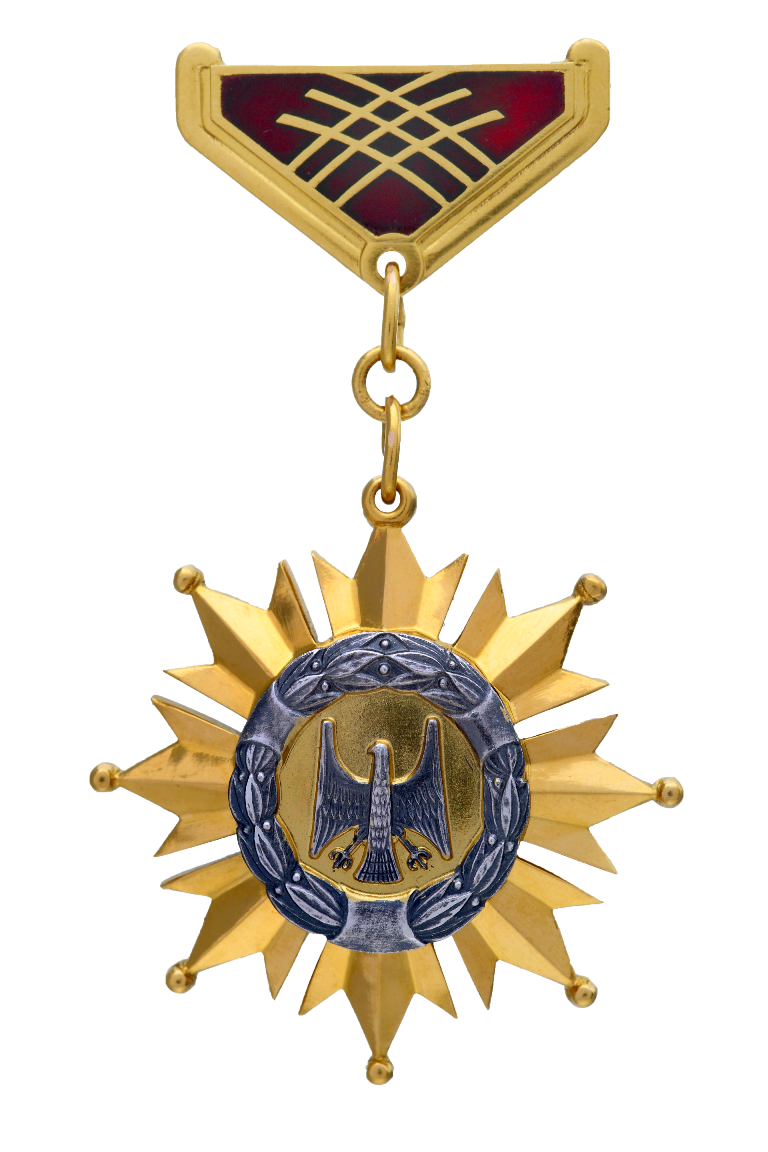
The Ak-Shumkar Medal of a Hero of the Kyrgyz Republic.

State awards of the Kyrgyz Republic include the orders, decorations, and medals in Kyrgyzstan. They consist of military and civil decorations that are bestowed by various agencies of the government.

== Brief history ==
In April 2026, President Sadyr Japarov signed the law On State Awards, Honorary Titles and State Prizes of the Kyrgyz Republic", introducing reforms to the Kyrgyz honours system, among which the number of awards was halfed from 46 to 22.

== Titles ==
=== Hero of the Kyrgyz Republic ===
The title of Hero of the Kyrgyz Republic is the highest state award in the country.

=== Honorary titles ===
- People's Artist of the Kyrgyz Republic
- People's Writer of the Kyrgyz Republic
- People's Poet of the Kyrgyz Republic
- People's Artist of the Kyrgyz Republic
- Honored Artist of the Kyrgyz Republic
- Honored Doctor of the Kyrgyz Republic
- Honored Inventor of the Kyrgyz Republic
- Honored Builder of the Kyrgyz Republic
- Honored Teacher of the Kyrgyz Republic
- Honored Lawyer of the Kyrgyz Republic
- Honored Economist of the Kyrgyz Republic
- Honored Worker of Culture of the Kyrgyz Republic
- Honored Scientist of the Kyrgyz Republic
- Honored Worker of the Geological Service of the Kyrgyz Republic
- Honored Worker of the State Service of the Kyrgyz Republic
- Honored Health Worker of the Kyrgyz Republic
- Honored Worker of Local Self-Government of the Kyrgyz Republic
- Honored Worker of Education of the Kyrgyz Republic
- Honored Worker of Nature Protection of the Kyrgyz Republic
- Honored Worker of Industry of the Kyrgyz Republic
- Honored Communications Worker of the Kyrgyz Republic
- Honored Worker of Agriculture of the Kyrgyz Republic
- Honored Worker of the Service Sector of the Kyrgyz Republic
- Honored Transport Worker of the Kyrgyz Republic
- Honored Worker of Physical Culture and Sports of the Kyrgyz Republic

==== People's Artist of Kyrgyzstan ====
The People's Artist of the Kyrgyz SSR is an honorary title established on January 10, 1939. It was established by the Presidium of the Supreme Council of the Kyrgyz SSR to outstanding artists who were particularly distinguished in the development of theater, music and cinema. As a rule, it was awarded no earlier than five years after the honorary title “Honored Artist of the Kyrgyz SSR” or “Honored Artist of the Kyrgyz SSR”. The next degree of recognition was the awarding of the title of People's Artist of the USSR. The first award ceremony took place in 1939; The first owner of this title was the actor Ashirali Botaliev. Artists of the Osh Uzbek Musical Drama Theater were one of the first in the republic to receive the title of people's artists of the Kyrgyz SSR. It was last awarded in 1986. With the collapse of the Soviet Union in Kyrgyzstan, the title "People's Artist of the Kyrgyz SSR" was replaced by the title "People's Artist of Kyrgyzstan", while the title retained the rights and obligations stipulated by the legislation of the former USSR and the Kyrgyz SSR on awards.

==== People's Writer of Kyrgyzstan ====
The People's Writer of the Kyrgyz Republic is awarded to writers, playwrights and literary critics for their special merits in the development of domestic literature. On June 20, 1968, the title "People's Writer of the Kyrgyz SSR" was established, which after the collapse of the USSR was replaced by the title "People's Writer of the Kyrgyz Republic".

== Orders and medals ==
They are listed in the order of precedence.

- Ak-Shumkar Medal (connected to the title of Hero of the Kyrgyz Republic)
- Order of Manas
- Order of Kurmanjan Datka
- Order of Danaker
- Dank Order
- Order of Dostyk
- Order of Mother Heroine
- Medal of Courage (Kyrgyz: «Эрдик» медалi)
- Dank Medal
- Medal "Mother's Glory"
- Order of Chinghiz Aitmatov

== Certificates of honor ==
Certificates of honor can be awarded for merits in enhancing the socio-economic situation of the country, significant achievements in the civil service, and achievements in the fields of education and medicine.

== Gallery ==
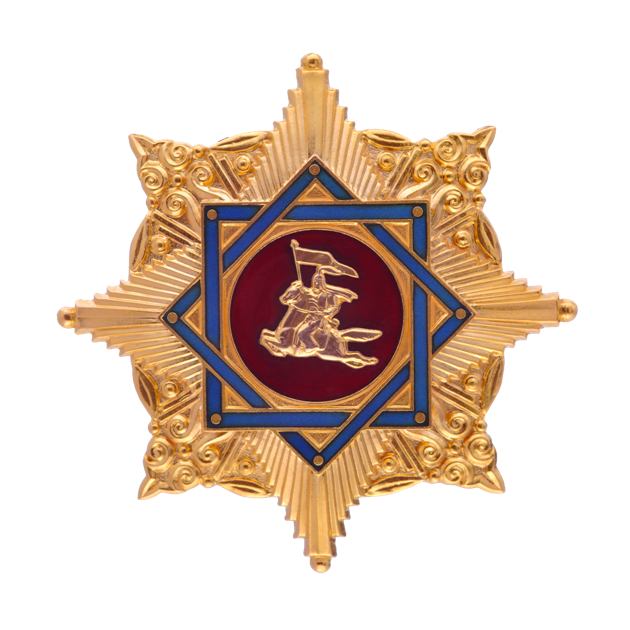
Star of the Order of Manas 1st class

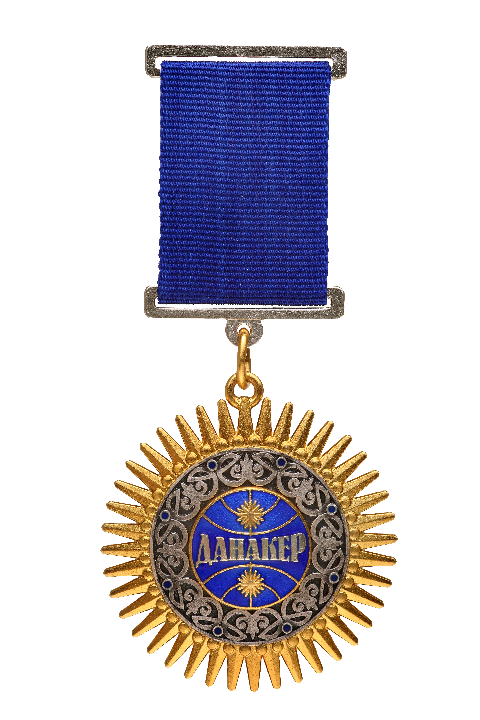
Medal of the Order of Danaker

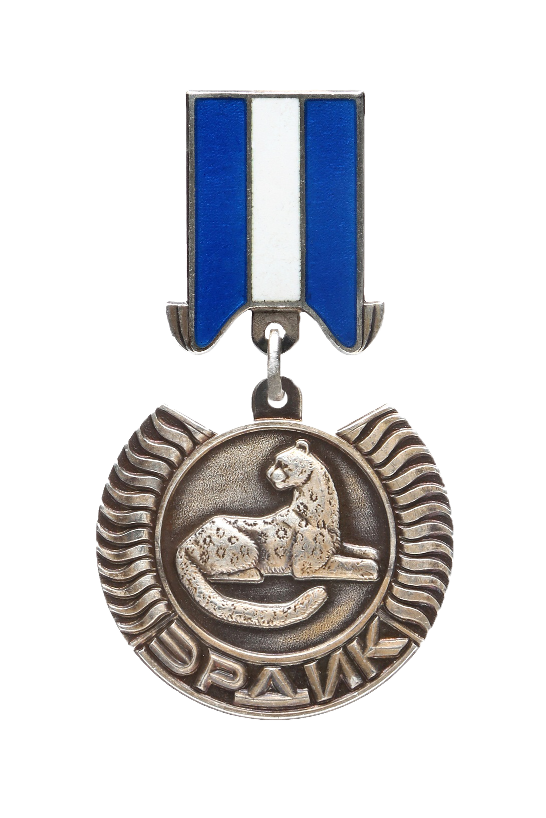
Medal of Courage ("Erdik" medal)
