= Absamat Masaliyev =

Soviet Kyrgyz politician (1933–2004)

- Абсамат Масалиев
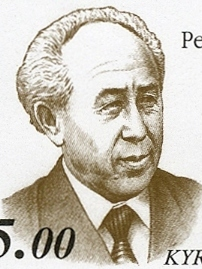
- Masaliyev as depicted on a 2008 Kyrgyz stamp

First Secretary of the Communist Party of Kirghizia
- In office November 2, 1985 – April 6, 1991
- Preceded by: Turdakun Usubaliev
- Succeeded by: Askar Akayev (as President of the Kirghiz SSR)

Personal details
- Born: April 10, 1933 Village Alysh, Kadamjay District, Osh Region, Kirghiz ASSR, Soviet Union
- Died: July 31, 2004 (aged 71) Bishkek, Kyrgyzstan
- Party: Communist Party of the Soviet Union
- Spouse: Khairinis Kozubaeva
- Children: 4
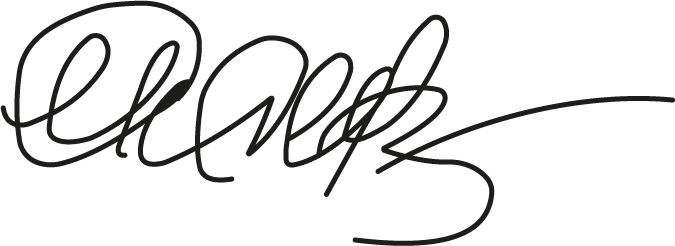
- Signature

Absamat Masaliyevich Masaliyev (Kyrgyz: Абсамат Масалы уулу Масалиев; April 10, 1933 – July 31, 2004) was the first Secretary of the Central Committee of the Communist Party of Kirghizia from November 1985 until Kyrgyz independence, and led the Party of Communists of Kyrgyzstan afterwards.

== History ==
He began studies at the Mining Technical School in southern Kirghizia in 1953. Three years later, he moved to the Moscow Mining Institute. He started his career as a deputy chief engineer at Kyzyl-Kyya coal mine in the south of Kirghizia.

In 1961 Masaliyev became an instructor at the regional branch of the Communist Party of Kirghizia in Osh. He worked his way up the ranks until he became First Secretary of the Central Committee of the Communist Party of Kirghizia in November 1985. From April 10 to December 10, 1990, he served as chairman of the Supreme Soviet of the Kirghiz Soviet Socialist Republic.

Masaliyev was a deputy of the Soviet of Nationalities of the Supreme Soviet of the USSR in its 10th to 11th convocations, from 1979 to 1989.

Apas Jumagulov and Absamat Masaliyev were the two original candidates for Kyrgyz Presidency on October 25, 1990, but neither could get the majority of votes, so the Supreme Soviet chose Askar Akayev to be the first president on October 27, 1990. Masaliyev was a candidate at 1995 presidential elections, losing to Akayev again. He held a seat in the Assembly of People's Representatives of the Supreme Council from 1995 until his death of a heart attack in 2004.
