= Toktogul Square =

Square in Bishkek, Kyrgyzstan

Toktogul Square is a square in Bishkek, Kyrgyzstan on Teatralnaya Street. It is named in honor Kyrgyz musician Toktogul Satilganov, with a statue to him also on the square. There are many buildings on the square, including the Kyrgyz Union for Consumer Goods, Museum of Fine Arts, Hotel "Kyrgyzstan", and the Opera and Ballet Theater.
