= Aqyn =

Kazakh and Kyrgyz poets and singers

Aqyn or akyn (Kazakh: ақын, Kyrgyz: акын, pronounced [ɑˈqɯn]; both transcribed as aqın or اقىن), is an improvisational poet, singer, and oral repository within the Kazakh and Kyrgyz cultures. Aqyns differ from the zhyraus or manaschys, who are instead song performers or epic storytellers.

In song competitions known as aytıs or aytysh, aqyns improvise in the form of a song-like recitative, usually to the accompaniment of a dombra (among Kazakhs) or a komuz (among Kyrgyz). In the context of the nomadic lifestyle and illiteracy of most of the rural population in Central Asia in pre-Soviet times, akyns played an important role in terms of expressing people's thoughts and feelings, exposing social vices, and glorifying heroes. In the Soviet era, their repertoire incorporated praise songs to Lenin.

Contemporary aqyns may also publish their original lyrics and poetry.

== Etymology ==
The term aqın is generally accepted to derive from the Persian religious title akhund, having entered the Kazakh and Kyrgyz languages in the 19th century as a result of broad social changes taking place in that time. Alternatively, some Kazakh scholars have attempted to connect it to the Kazakh word ağın meaning "flow", which goes back to Proto-Turkic *akïn.

== Kazakh aqyns ==
Famous historical Kazakh akyns include: Zhanak Kambaruluy (1760–1857), Makhambet Otemisuly (1804–1846), Suyunbai Aronuly (1815–1898), Shernyz Zharylgasov (1817–1881), Birzhan-Sal Khodgulov (1834–1897), Ziaus Baizhanov (1835–1929), Akan Sery Corramsauluy (1843–1913), Zhambyl Zhabayuly (1846–1945), Gaziz Firesoll (mind 1930), Kenen Azerbaev (1884–1976), and Aktan Kereiuly.

Aqyns often fully improvise, responding to any phenomena in society or at the situation on nationwide holidays, etc. On holidays, a kind of aqyn competition is often held. During the akyn contest, having fun, alternately in poetry form, try to make fun of each other or choosing any arbitrary theme. Sometimes, the authorities are trying to subjected to Aytyus censorship when it comes to the power of property or politicians.

The nomadic lifestyle and fleeting nature of akyns' art made it impossible to record and preserve their works on paper in the past. As a result, most of their works have been lost.

== Kyrgyz aqyns ==
Famous Kyrgyz aqyns include Qalygul, Arstanbek, Soltonbay, Toqtogul Satylganov, Togoloq Moldo, Qylychty, Naymanbay, Qalmyrza, Eshmanbet, and Beknazar. Sometimes manaschys are also considered a separate story-telling category of aqyns.

== Literature ==
- Nurmakhan, Zhanash: Kazaktyn 5000 Akyn-zhyrauy. Almaty 2008. ISBN 9965-742-70-7 (in Kazakh)

== See also ==
- Kazakh music
- Kyrgyz music
