= Iskhak Razzakov =

First secretary of Communist Party of Kirghizia

- Исхак Раззаков
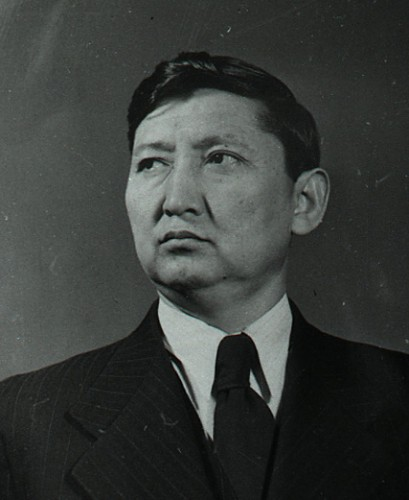

First Secretary of Communist Party of Kirghizia
- In office 7 July 1950 – 9 May 1961
- Preceded by: Nikolay Bogolyubov
- Succeeded by: Turdakun Usubaliev

Personal details
- Born: 25 October 1910 Koroson, Russian Turkestan (now Lenin, Kyrgyzstan)
- Died: 19 March 1979 (aged 68) Moscow, Russian SFSR, Soviet Union (now Russia)
- Party: Communist Party of the Soviet Union
- Other political affiliations: Communist Party of Kirghizia

Iskhak Razzak uulu Razzakov (Note: Kyrgyz: Исхак Раззак уулу Раззаков; Russian: Исхак Раззакович Раззаков, romanized: Iskhak Razzakovich Razzakov) (25 October [O.S. 12 October] 1910 – 19 March 1979) was a Kyrgyz Soviet politician who served as First Secretary of Communist Party of Kirghizia from 7 July 1950 to 9 May 1961.

== Early life ==
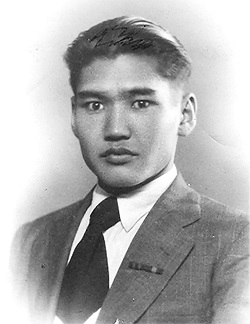
Razzakov in his youth

Razzakov was born in the village of Koroson, in what was then the colony of Russian Turkestan, (now Lenin, in Kyrgyzstan's Batken Region) on 25 October 1910. Razzakov lost his mother at the age of three, his father died two years later. His relatives sent him to a shelter where he was taught various languages. Razzakov studied in Uzbekistan and Russia. He taught social studies at Samarkand, Uzbekistan.

== Rise to politics and leading Kyrgyzstan ==
Razzakov was appointed as Chairman of the Council of People's Commissars of the Kirghiz SSR, a position equivalent to head of government, in November 1945. At the time of his appointment he was 35 years old. Much of his previous activities as a member of the Communist Party of the Soviet Union had been conducted in the Uzbek Soviet Socialist Republic, and he said in February 1946, "I have not worked in Kirghizia for very long at all, and to me your trust is dear. I, a son of our people, promise you, comrades, to devote all my strength and knowledge to the devotion of great tasks."

Razzakov's tenure was marked by efforts to improve the Kyrgyz economy, with a particular focus on agriculture. In 1950 he was appointed as the First Secretary of the Communist Party of Kirghizia.

Razzakov played a significant role in shaping Kyrgyzstan. The current Kyrgyzstan state university, polytechnic institute, and women's pedagogical institute in Kyrgyzstan were built during his time in government. Kyrgyzstan went through major cultural improvements during his tenure. 20 important objects of national industry were put into operation during his time. The Frunze agricultural plant and the Osh mountain highway road were also built.

== Later life and death ==
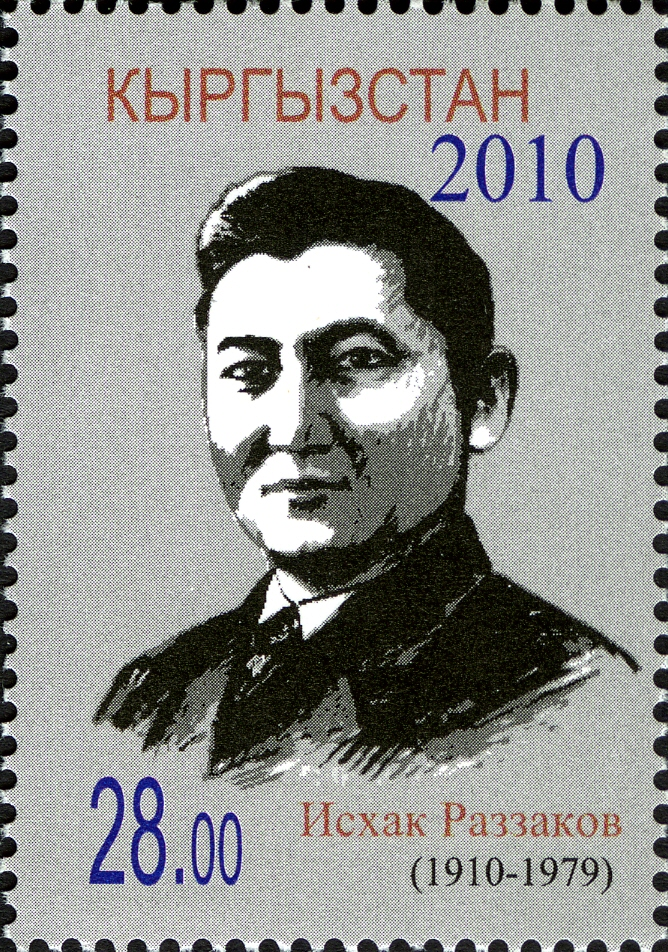
Razzakov on a 2010 Kyrgyzstan stamp

In the 1960s he fell out of favor with Nikita Khrushchev and was persecuted. He moved to Moscow with his family, where he died on 19 March 1979.
