= Bolotbek Shamshiyev =

Soviet film director

- Болотбек Шамшиев
- Born: 12 January 1941; Frunze, Kyrgyz SSR, USSR
- Died: 21 December 2019 (aged 78); Bishkek, Kyrgyzstan
- Occupations: Film director Screenwriter
- Years active: 1965–1988

Bolotbek Shamshiyev (12 January 1941 – 21 December 2019) was a Kyrgyz film director and screenwriter. He directed eleven films between 1965 and 1988. His 1976 film The White Ship was entered into the 26th Berlin International Film Festival.

== Selected filmography ==
- Heat (Зной, 1963, actor)
- Gunshot at the Mountain Pass (Выстрел на перевале Караш, 1969)
- The Red Poppies at Issyk-Kul (Алые маки Иссык-Куля, 1972)
- The White Ship (Белый Пароход, 1976)
- Snipers (Снайперы, 1985)
