= Sabira Kumushaliyeva =

Krygyzstani actress (1917–2007)

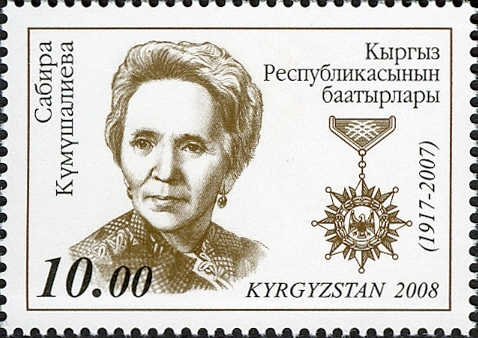
- Kumushaliyeva on a 2008 Kyrgyzstani postal stamp
- Born: 17 March 1917; Tokoldosh, Russian Empire
- Died: 15 September 2007 (aged 90)
- Occupation: Actress

Sabira Kumushaliyeva (Kyrgyz: Сабира Күмүшалиева) (March 19, 1917 – September 15, 2007) was a Kyrgyzstani actress of the Soviet era.

== Biography ==
Kumushaliyeva was born in the village of Tokoldosh, which is today part of the city of Bishkek. She was one of a group of actresses known as the "Four Daughters of Tököldösh"; the other three were Darkul Kuyukova, Baken Kydykeyeva, and Saira Kiyizbaeva. She first acted at the age of 14. During the 1930s she worked as a teacher; around 1934 she began her stage career. She interrupted it during World War II to support the war effort, but resumed acting afterwards. In 1955 she began to appear in films, ultimately starring in numerous Kazakh and Kyrgyz productions during her career, continuing until 1990. A recipient of the Order of the Badge of Honour, she was named Honored Artist of the USSR and, in 1967, People's Artist of Kyrgyzstan, among other awards. Kumushaliyeva was the subject of a postage stamp issued in 2008, the year after her death. Over the course of her career she appeared in some twenty films. She continued her stage career until the end of her life.
