= Kyrgyz Academy of Sciences =

National Academy of Sciences of Kyrgyz Republic
- Кыргыз Республикасынын Улуттук илимдер академиясы (Kyrgyz); Национальная академия наук Кыргызской Республики (Russian)
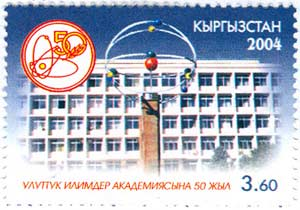
- Abbreviation: NAN KR
- Type: GO
- Purpose: Fundamental and applied research contributing to the development of productive forces of the country, its scientific and technical potential, culture, education, literature, and arts, the formation of law-governed state, and contributing to peace-building and international friendship
- Location: Bishkek, Kyrgyzstan
- Coordinates: 42°52′41″N 74°34′47″E
- President: Kanat Abdrakhmatov (since November 2022)
- Budget: 479,200,000 Kyrgyz som (2022)
- Staff: 1810
- Website: naskr.kg

Kyrgyz Academy of Sciences (official name: National Academy of Sciences of the Republic of Kyrgyzstan), (Kyrgyz: Кыргыз Республикасынын Улуттук илимдер академиясы), originally part of the Soviet Academy of Sciences, was established as an independent entity by government decree in December 1993.

The aims of the academy are to carry out research in natural, engineering, and social sciences, to train scientists in all fields of knowledge, to advise the government in matters of scientific policy, and to disseminate knowledge. The academy defines the research topics in the national research institutions, coordinates basic research funded by the state, participates in international organizations, and organizes symposia and conferences to discuss scientific issues and coordinate research. As of 2008, there are 37 academicians, 57 corresponding members, and 7 foreign members. Academician Kanat Abdrakhmatov was elected to a position as the new president of the Academy on 28 November 2022.

== History ==
The history of the Kyrgyz Academy of Sciences begins in 1943 when Kyrgyz Branch of the Academy of Sciences of the USSR was established. It included institutes of geology, biology, chemistry, language, and history. An increasing potential of the branch resulted in establishing the Academy of Sciences of Kyrgyz SSR by a decree of the Council of Ministers of the Soviet Union on August 17, 1954. Among 8 research units of the academy were institutes of: chemistry, geology, botanic, water management and energy, history, zoology and parasitology, language and literature, and medicine. In December 1993, the Academy of Sciences was transformed into National Academy of Sciences with newly established South branch.

== Departments and Institutions ==
The academy has 3 major departments (sections), specifically:

- Physico Technical, Mathematical, and Mining and Geological Sciences,
- Chemical Engineering, Medical and Biological, and Agrarian Sciences, and
- Social Sciences

Each of departments consists of scientific institutes, and centers.

=== Department of Physico Technical, Mathematical, and Mining and Geological Sciences ===
- Institute of Automatics and Information Technologies
- Institute of Machine Science
- Institute of Theoretical and Applied Mathematics
- Institute of Physico Technical Problems and Material Engineering
- Institute of Water Problems and Hydroenergetics
- Institute of Geology
- Institute of Rock Mechanics and Exploration of Mineral Resources
- Institute of Seismology

=== Department of Chemical Engineering, Medical and Biological, and Agrarian Sciences ===
- Institute of Biotechnology
- Institute of Forest after G.A.Gan
- Botanical Garden after E.Z Gareev
- Institute of Chemistry and Chemical Engineering
- Institute of Mountain Physiology
- Innovation Center of Phytotechnologies
- Botanic and Soils Institute

=== Department of Social Sciences ===
- Institute of History and Cultural Heritage
- Institute of Language and Literature after Ch.T.Aitmatov
- Institute of Economics after A.Alyshbaev
- Institute of Philosophy and Political-Legal Research
- Center of Methodology of Science and Social Research

== Budget ==
The budget of the organization was 479,200,000 Kyrgyz som in 2022.

== Presidents of the Academy of Sciences ==
The list of presidents of the Academy of Sciences is as follows:

| Name | Dates | Field of Expertise | Organization |
|---|---|---|---|
| Constantin Scriabine | January 1943 - July 1952 | Veterinary Science | Kyrgyz branch of the Academy of Sciences of USSR |
| Isa Akhunbaev | July 1952 - December 1954 | Medicine | Kyrgyz branch of the Academy of Sciences of USSR |
| Isa Akhunbaev | December 1954 - February 1960 | Medicine | Academy of Sciences of Kyrgyz SSR |
| Kurman-Gali Karakeev | February 1960 - November 1978 | History | Academy of Sciences of Kyrgyz SSR |
| Musa Adyshev | November 1978 - December 1978 | Geology | Academy of Sciences of Kyrgyz SSR |
| Murzabek Imanaliev | July 1979 - March 1987 | Mathematics | Academy of Sciences of Kyrgyz SSR |
| Nikolay Laverov | July 1987 - March 1989 | Geology | Academy of Sciences of Kyrgyz SSR |
| Askar Akaev | March 1989 - October 1990 | Optoelectronics | Academy of Sciences of Kyrgyz SSR |
| Ilgiz Aitmatov | December 1990 - December 1993 | Mechanics of Rocks | National Academy of Sciences of Kyrgyz Republic |
| Turar Koychuev | December 1993 - December 1997 | Economics | National Academy of Sciences of Kyrgyz Republic |
| Janybek Jeenbaev | December 1997 - April 2007 | Physics | National Academy of Sciences of Kyrgyz Republic |
| Sharipa Jorobekova | April 2007 - April 2012 | Physical Chemistry | National Academy of Sciences of Kyrgyz Republic |
| Abdygany Erkebayev | April 2012 - April 2017 | Kyrgyz Literature | National Academy of Sciences of Kyrgyz Republic |
| Murat Djumataev | October 2017 - October 2022 | Machine science | National Academy of Sciences of Kyrgyz Republic |
| Kanat Abdrakhmatov | since November 2022 | Seismology | National Academy of Sciences of Kyrgyz Republic |

== Academicians ==
- Musa Adyshev
- Askar Akayev
- Andrey Korjenkov
- Vladimir Ploskikh
- Kakish Ryskulova

== Gallery ==
Institutes of the National Academy of Sciences of the Kyrgyz Republic
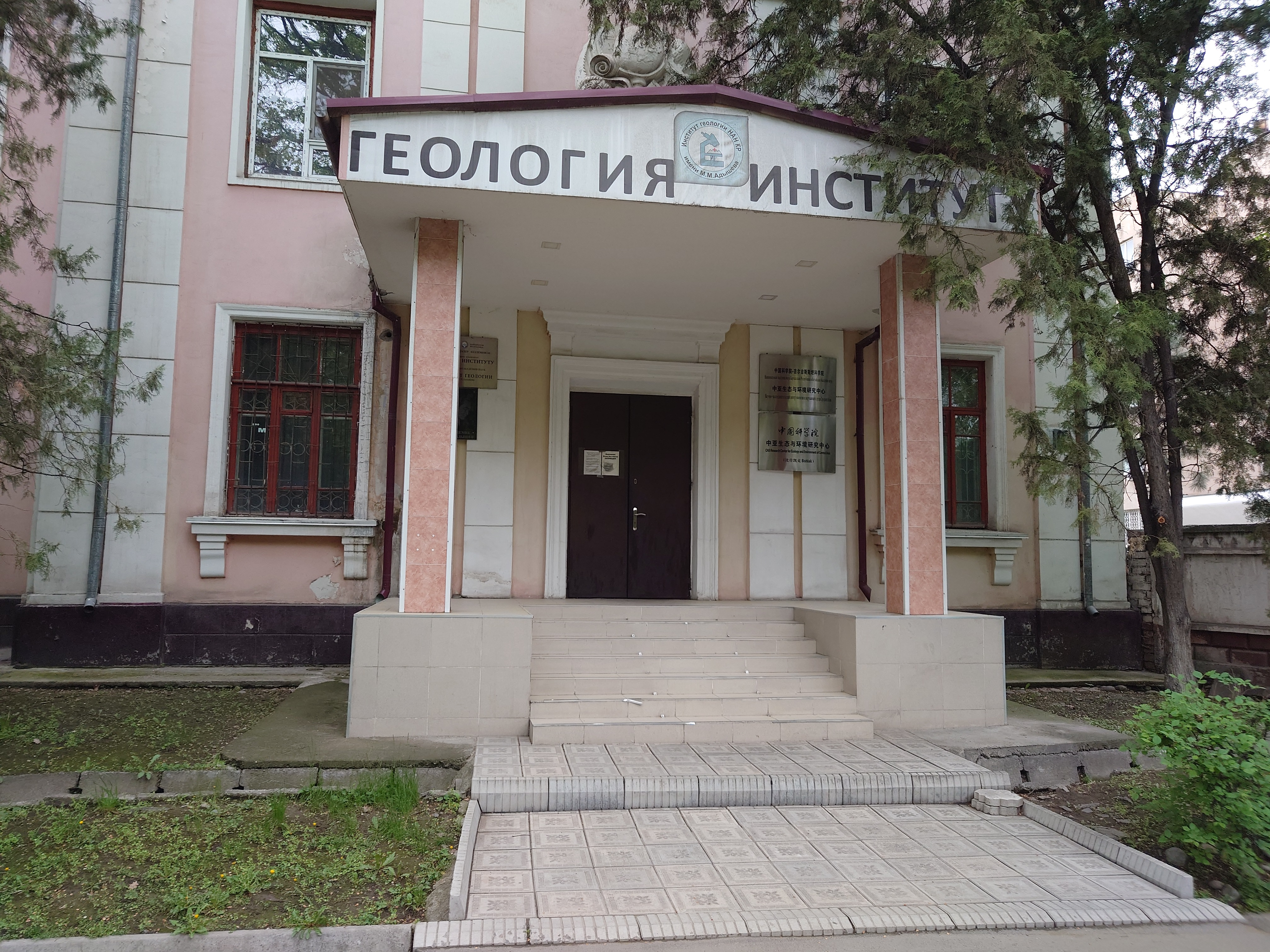
Institute of Geology

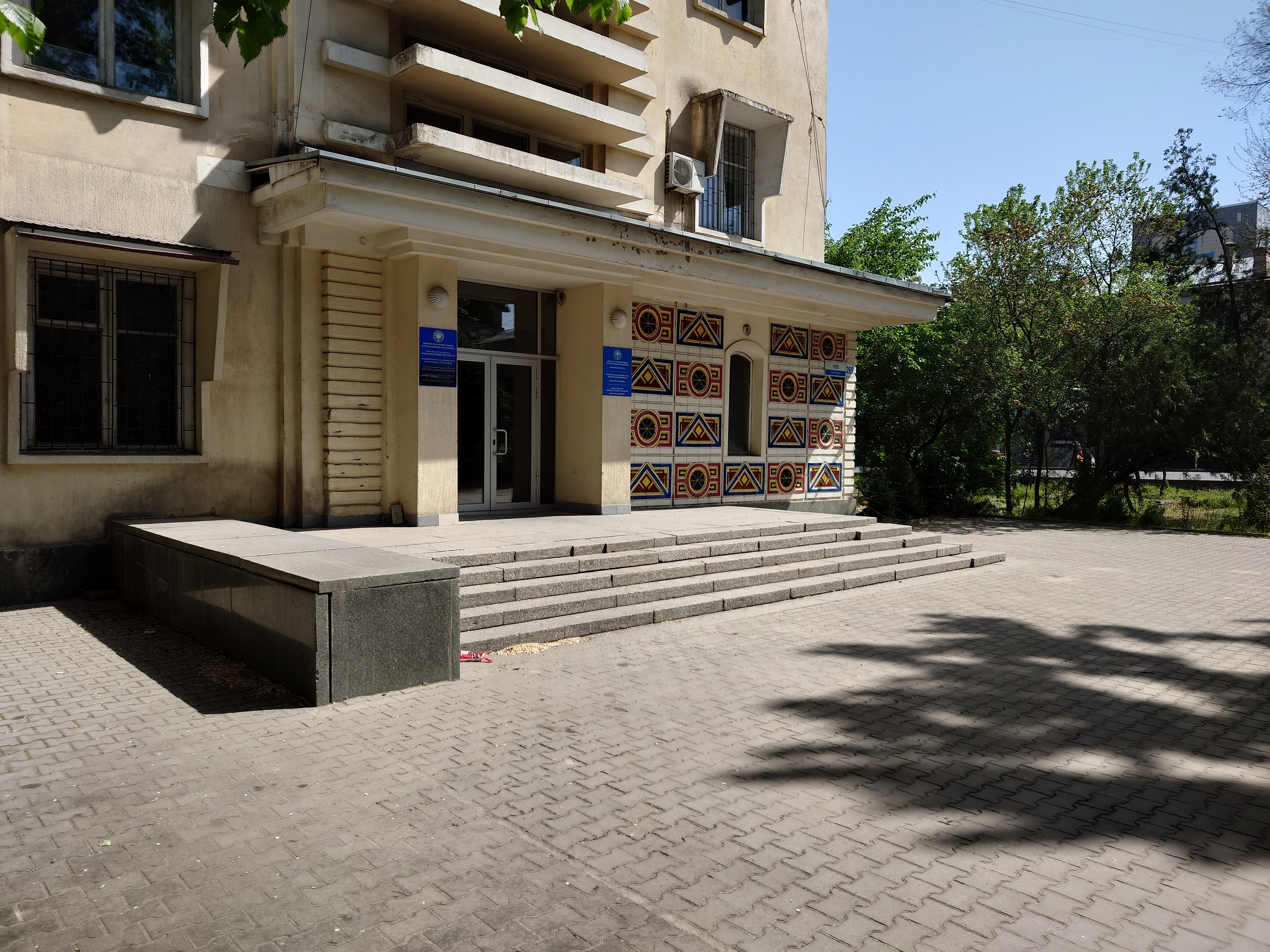
Institute of Biotechnology

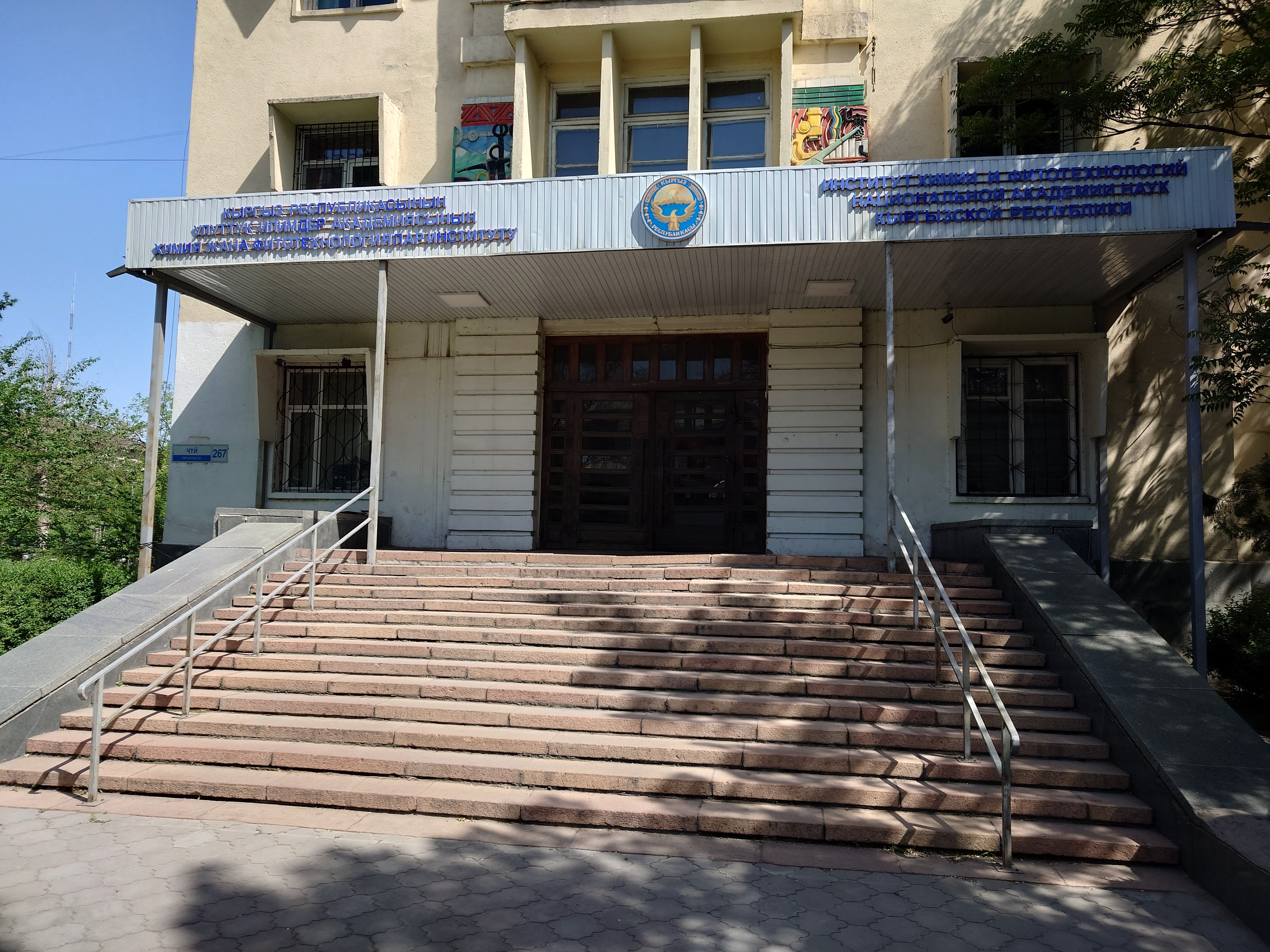
Institute of Chemistry and Phytotechnologies

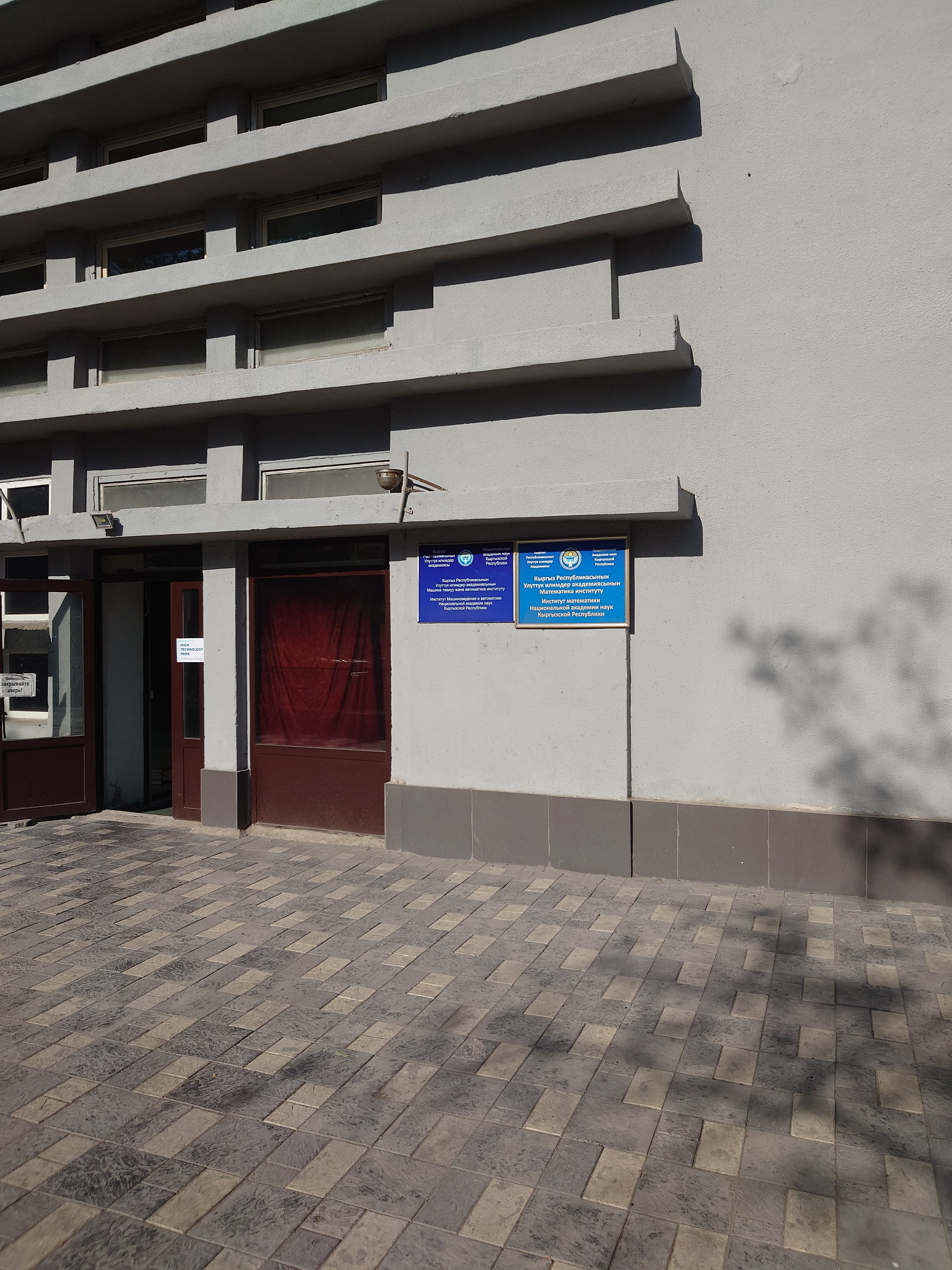
Institute of Mathematics, and Institute of Machine Science and Automatics
