= Communist Party of Kirghizia =

Ruling party of Soviet Kyrgyzstan

Communist Party of Kirghizia Кыргызстан Коммунисттик партиясы (Kyrgyz) Коммунистическая партия Киргизии (Russian)
- Leader: Nikolai Uzukov (1925–1927); Jumgalbek Amanbayev (1991)
- Founded: 14 October 1924
- Banned: 26 August 1991
- Succeeded by: Party of Communists of Kyrgyzstan
- Headquarters: Aaka Tokombayev, Bishkek, Kirghizia, Soviet Union
- Ideology: Communism; Marxism–Leninism
- Political position: Far-left
- National affiliation: Communist Party of the Soviet Union
- Supreme Soviet (1990): 315 / 350 (90%)

Party flag

The Communist Party of Kirghizia (Kyrgyz: Кыргызстан Коммунисттик партиясы, romanized: Kyrgyzstan Kommunisttik partiasy) was the ruling political party in the Kirghiz Soviet Socialist Republic, which operated as a republican branch of the Communist Party of the Soviet Union.

== Regional committees ==
- Frunze City Committee
- Jalal-Abad Regional Committee of the Communist Party of Kyrgyzstan
- Issyk-Kul Regional Committee of the Communist Party of Kyrgyzstan
- Naryn Regional Committee of the Communist Party of Kyrgyzstan
- Osh Regional Committee of the Communist Party of Kyrgyzstan
- Talas Regional Committee of the Communist Party of Kyrgyzstan
- Frunze Regional Committee of the Communist Party of Kyrgyzstan

== First Secretaries of the Communist Party of Kirghizia ==
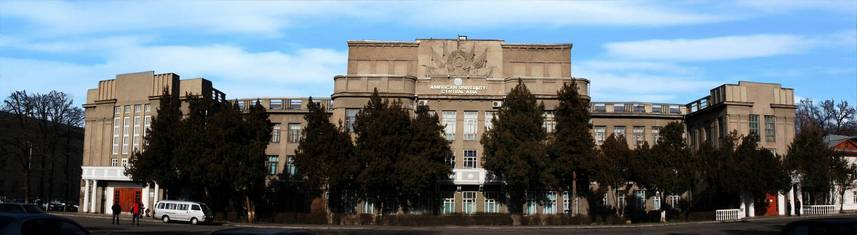
Central Committee Building of the Communist Party of Kirghizia, Bishkek.

- Nikolay Uzukov (1925–1927)
- Vladimir Shubrikov (1927–1929)
- Mikhail Kulkov (1929–1930)
- Alexander Shakhray (1930–1934)
- Moris Belotsky (1934–1937)
- Maksim Ammosov (1937)
- Aleksey Vagov (1938–1945)
- Nikolay Bogolyubov (1945–1950)
- Iskhak Razzakov (1950–1961)
- Turdakun Usubaliyev (1961–1985)
- Absamat Masaliyev (1985–1991)
- Jumgalbek Amanbayev (1991)

== See also ==
- Leadership of Communist Kyrgyzstan
- Party of Communists of Kyrgyzstan (the 1999 split Communist Party of Kyrgyzstan)
- Kakish Ryskulova
