= List of medical schools in Asia =

The following is a list of medical schools (or universities with a medical school), in Asia.

== Afghanistan ==
- Jami University
- Al-Beroni University
- Ghalib University
- Herat University
- Ibne-sina Balkh Medical School
- Kabul Medical University
- Kandahar University
- Nangarhar University
- Spinghar Higher Education Centre
- Taj Higher Education center
- Mawlana Jalaludin Mohammad Balkhi University

== Armenia ==
- Armenian Medical Institute
- Yerevan Haybusak University
- Yerevan State Medical University
- Yerevan University of Traditional Medicine

== Azerbaijan ==
- Azerbaijan Medical University
- Khazar University

== Cambodia ==
- International University, Cambodia (IU)
- University of Health Sciences – Cambodia (UHS-C)
- University of Puthisastra (UP)

== Georgia ==
- Akaki Tsereteli State University
- David Agmashenebeli University of Georgia
- Tbilisi State Medical University
- Tbilisi State University
- Tbilisi Medical Academy
- David Tvildiani Medical University
- Grigol Robakidze University

== Iran ==
- Alborz University of Medical Sciences (Karaj)
- Ahvaz Jundishapur University of Medical Sciences
- Arak University of Medical Sciences
- Hamadan University of Medical Sciences
- Isfahan University of Medical Sciences
- Mashhad University of Medical Sciences
- Qom University of Medical Sciences
- Shahid Beheshti University of Medical Sciences (Tehran)
- Shiraz University of Medical Sciences
- Tabriz University of Medical Sciences
- Tehran University of Medical Sciences
- Urmia University of Medical Sciences

== Jordan ==
- Hashemite University
- Jordan University of Science and Technology
- Mutah University
- University of Jordan

== Kazakhstan ==
- International medical school (UIB)
- Caspian International School Of Medicine
- Astana Medical University
- Ahmet Yesevi Üniversitesi
- Karaganda State Medical University
- Kazakh National Medical University
- Semipalatinsk State Medical Academy
- South Kazakhstan State Medical Academy
- West Kazakhstan Marat Ospanov State Medical University
- Kazakh-Russian Medical University

== Kyrgyzstan ==
- Bishkek International Medical Institute
- International Medical Faculty, Osh State University
- Asian Medical Institute
- International Higher School of Medicine
- Jalalabad State University
- Kyrgyz-Russian Slavic University
- Kyrgyz State Medical Academy
- Medical Institute, Osh State University
- International Medical Institute, Bishkek
- Medical Faculty, Adam University, Bishkek

== Laos ==
- University of Health Sciences

== Lebanon ==
- American University of Beirut
- Holy Spirit University of Kaslik
- Lebanese American University
- Lebanese University
- University of Balamand
- Université Saint Joseph

== Mongolia ==
- Inner Mongolia Medical University
- Mongolian National University
- Mongolian National University of Medical Sciences (separated from National University of Mongolia)

== Myanmar (Burma) ==
- Defence Services Medical Academy (DSMA)
- University of Dental Medicine, Mandalay
- University of Dental Medicine, Yangon
- University of Medicine 1, Yangon
- University of Medicine 2, Yangon
- University of Medicine, Magway
- University of Medicine, Mandalay
- University of Medicine, Taunggyi
- University of Nursing, Mandalay
- University of Nursing, Yangon
- University of Medical Technology, Mandalay
- University of Medical Technology, Yangon
- University of Traditional Medicine, Mandalay

== North Korea ==
- Chongjin Medical University
- Haeju Medical University
- Hamhung Medical University
- Hyesan Medical University
- Kanggye Medical University
- Pyongsong Medical University
- Pyongyang Medical University
- Sariwon Medical University
- Sinuiju Medical University
- Wonsan Medical University

== Palestine ==
- Al-Azhar University of Gaza Faculty of Medicine
- Al-Quds University Faculty of Medicine
- An-Najah National University Faculty of Medicine and Health Sciences
- Arab American University Faculty of Medicine
- Hebron University College of Medicine
- Islamic University of Gaza Faculty of Medicine
- Palestine Polytechnic University College of Human Medicine

== Saudi Arabia ==
- Alfaisal University
- Batterjee Medical College
- Ibn Sina National College for Medical Studies
- Imam Muhammad ibn Saud Islamic University
- King Faisal University
- King Saud bin Abdulaziz University for Health Sciences
- King Saud University
- Majmaah University
- Northern Borders University
- Qassim University
- Sulaiman Al Rajhi Colleges
- Umm al-Qura University

== Seychelles ==
- University of Seychelles - American Institute of Medicine

== Singapore ==
- Duke–NUS Medical School (National University of Singapore)
- Lee Kong Chian School of Medicine (Nanyang Technological University)
- Yong Loo Lin School of Medicine (National University of Singapore)

== Sri Lanka ==
- Wayamba University of Sri Lanka
- Sabaragamuwa University of Sri Lanka
- University of Moratuwa
- Eastern University of Sri Lanka
- General Sir John Kotelawala Defence University
- Rajarata University
- South Asian Institute of Technology and Medicine (defunct)
- University of Colombo (formerly the Ceylon Medical College)
  - Institute of Indigenous Medicine
  - Postgraduate Institute of Medicine
- University of Jaffna
- University of Kelaniya (formerly the North Colombo Medical College)
- University of Peradeniya
- University of Ruhuna
- University of Sri Jayewardenepura
- Open International University for Complementary Medicines

== Tajikistan ==
- Tajik State Medical University

== Turkmenistan ==
- Turkmen State Medical University

== Uzbekistan ==
- Tashkent State Dental Institute, Faculty of Medicine
- Bukhara State Medical Institute, Bukhara
  - University of Health Sciences (Turkey), Bukhara Ibni Sina Medical School
- Tashkent Pediatric Medical Institute
- Samarkand State Medical Institute
  - University of Health Sciences (Turkey), Samarkand Medical School
- Tashkent Medical Academy

== Vietnam ==
- Hanoi Medical University
- Ho Chi Minh City University of Medicine and Pharmacy
- Vietnam Military Medical University
- Huế College of Medicine and Pharmacy
- Pham Ngoc Thach University of Medicine
- Thái Bình University of Medicine and Pharmacy
- Thái Nguyên University
- Tra Vinh University
- VNU University of Medicine and Pharmacy - Vietnam National University, Hanoi
- School of Medicine - Vietnam National University, Ho Chi Minh City
- Can Tho University of Medicine and Pharmacy
- Hai Phong Medical University
- Vinh Medical University
- University of Da Nang
- Duy Tan University
- VinUniversity
- University of Da Nang, School Of Medicine and Pharmacy
