= Vinh =

- Provincial city (Class-1)
- Vinh City; Thành phố Vinh
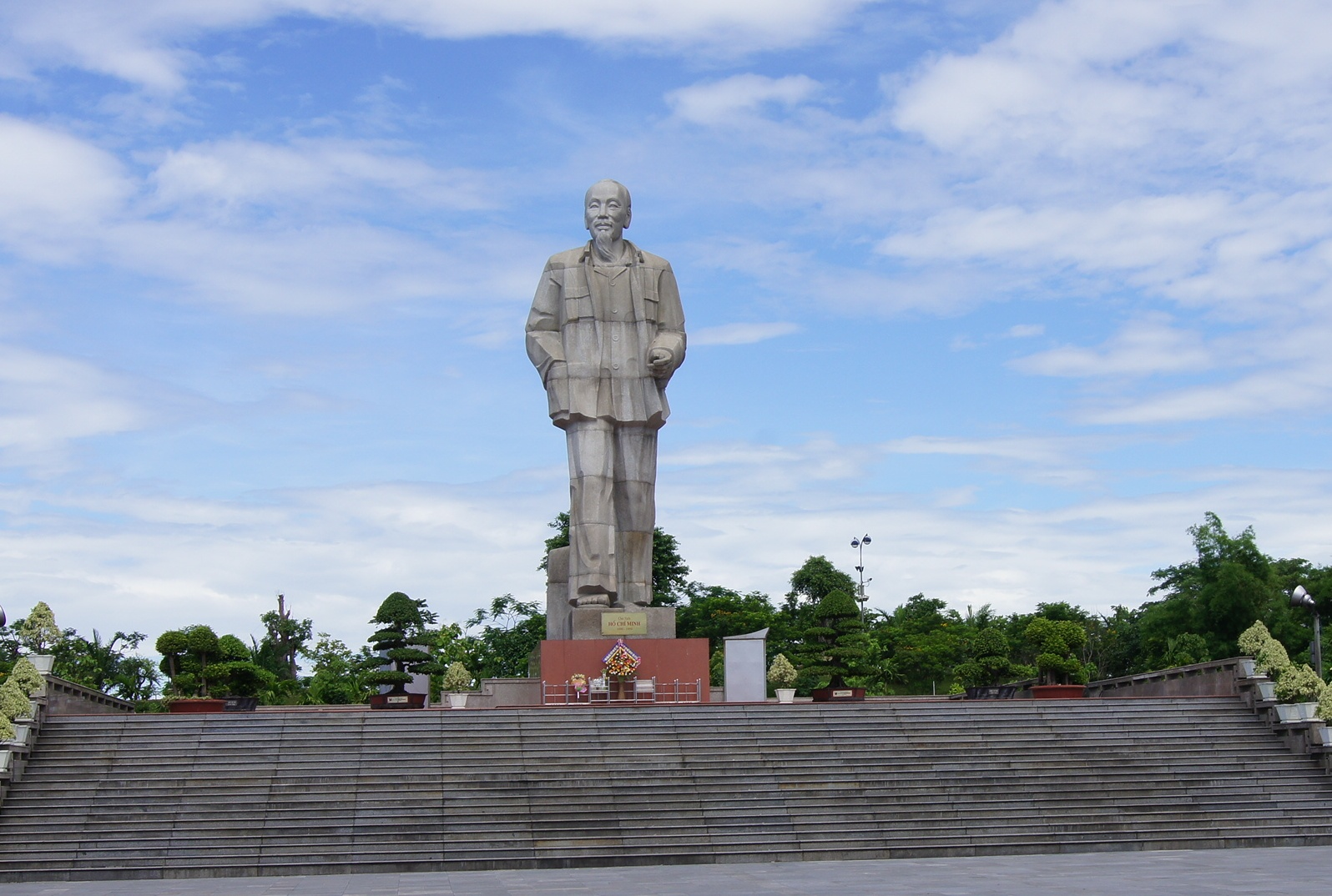
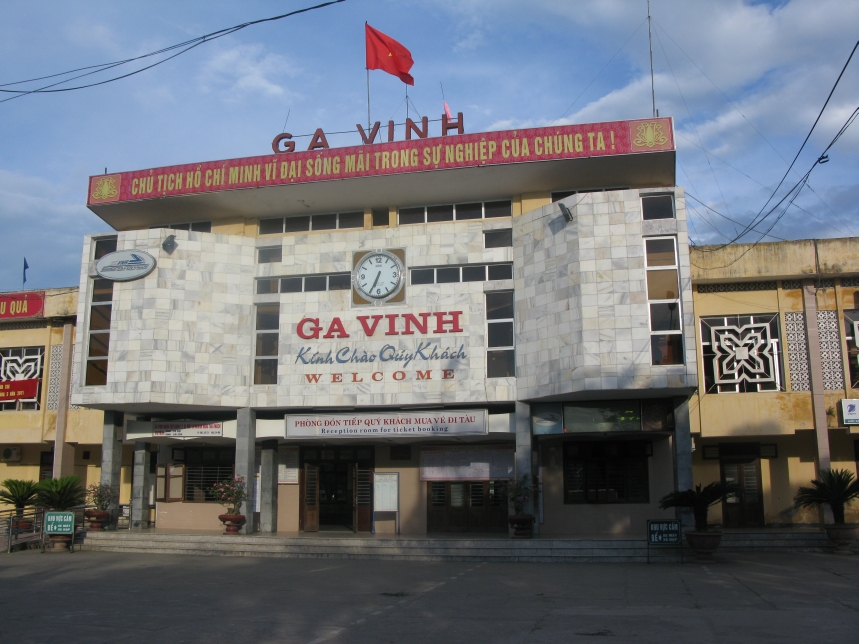
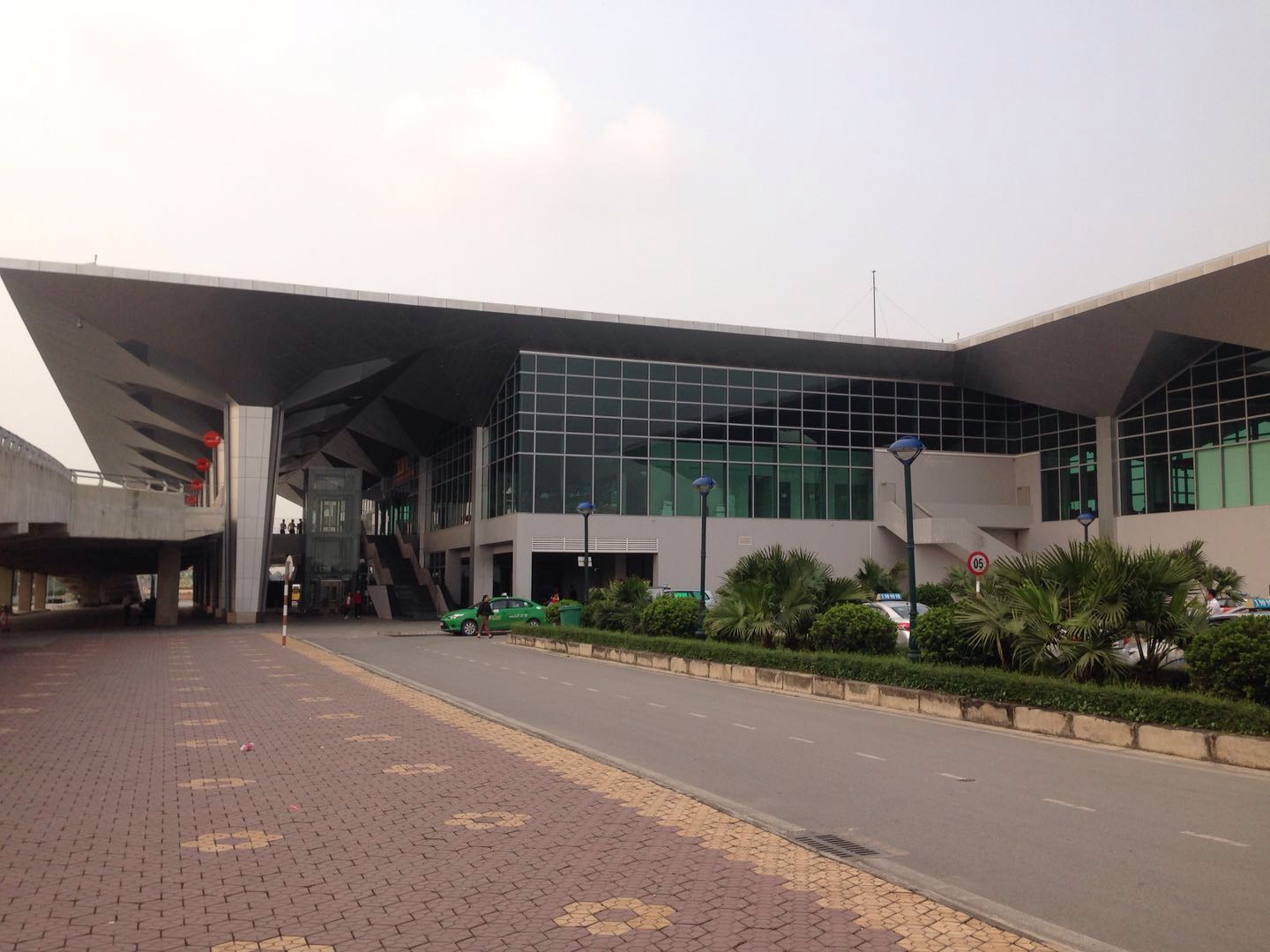
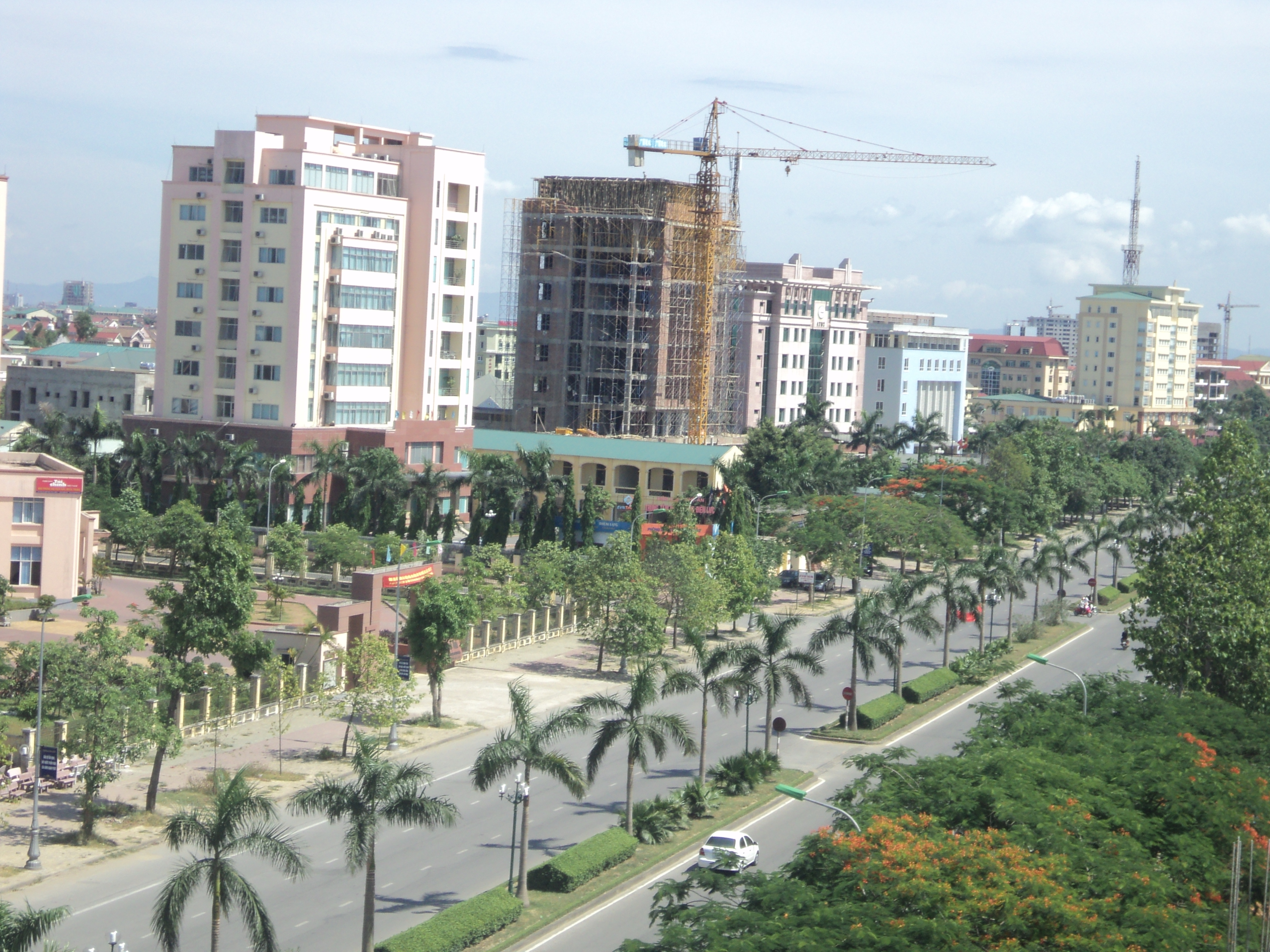
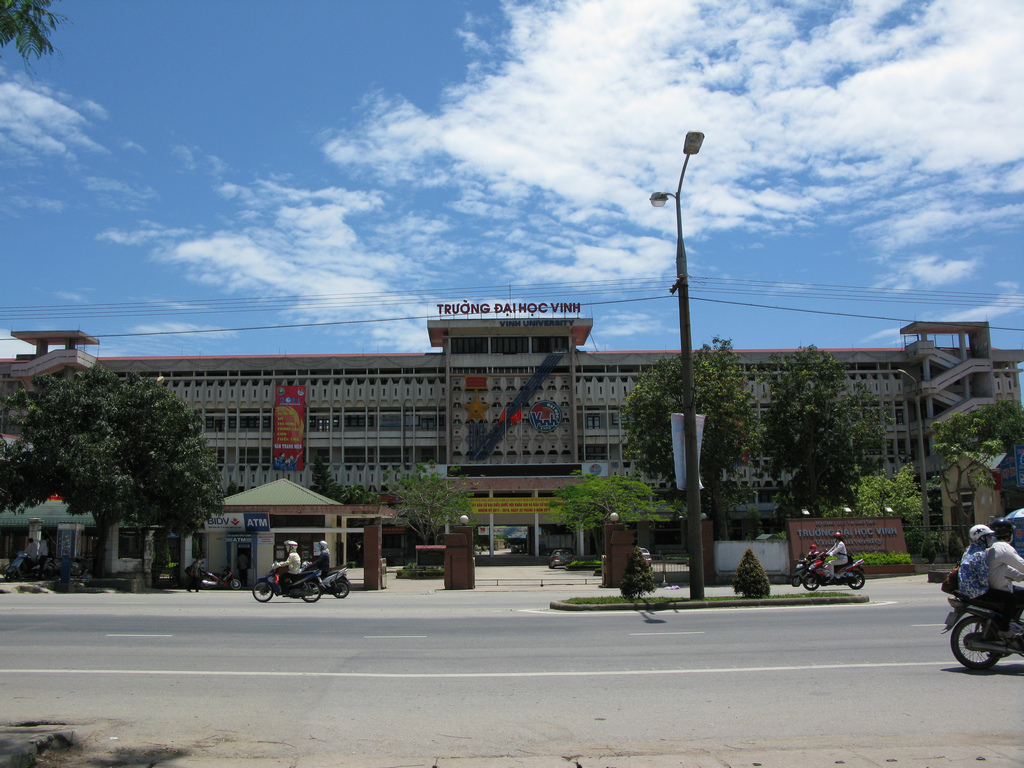
- Clockwise from top: Ho Chi Minh Square, Vinh International Airport, Vinh University, Lenin Avenue, Vinh Railway Station

- Seal

- Location in Vietnam
- Coordinates: 18°40′N 105°40′E
- Country: Vietnam
- Province: Nghệ An Province

Area
  - Total: 166.22 km^{2} (64.18 sq mi)

Population (2025 estimate)
  - Total: 580,669
  - Density: 3,493.4/km^{2} (9,047.8/sq mi)
- Climate: Cwa/Am
- Website: http://www.vinhcity.gov.vn

Vinh (Vietnamese: [viŋ̟]) is a former city located in the North Central Coast region of Vietnam and was the capital city of Nghệ An province, Vietnam. Vinh also is an economic and cultural center of the country's North-Central region. The city's name "Vinh" currently refers to a 166.22 square kilometres (64.18 sq mi) area, comprising an urban agglomeration of 6 wards, including Trường Vinh, Thành Vinh, Vinh Hưng, Vinh Phú, Vinh Lộc, and Cửa Lò.

On September 5, 2008, it was upgraded from a Grade-II city to a Grade-I city, becoming the fourth city to hold the status, after Haiphong, Đà Nẵng and Huế.

Vinh is located in the Southeast of Nghe An, alongside the Lam River and is located on the main North–South transportation route of Vietnam, making it accessible by highway, railroad, boat and air. The Vinh International Airport is served daily by four carriers: Vietnam Airlines, VietJet Air, Bamboo Airways and Jetstar Pacific. Vinh is a key point in the East–West economic corridor linking Myanmar, Thailand, Laos and Vietnam.

The city was bordered by Nghi Lộc district to the North and East, Hưng Nguyên district to the West, and Nghi Xuân district of Hà Tĩnh Province to the South across the Lam River. Vinh was about 300 kilometres (190 mi) South of Hanoi and 1,400 kilometres (870 mi) North of Ho Chi Minh City.

In 2025, the population of the city was 580669. The total area of the city was 166.22 square kilometres (64.18 sq mi), divided administratively into 24 wards and 9 communes.

Vinh ceased to exist as a municipal city on 1 July 2025, following the elimination of district level units in Vietnam.

== History ==
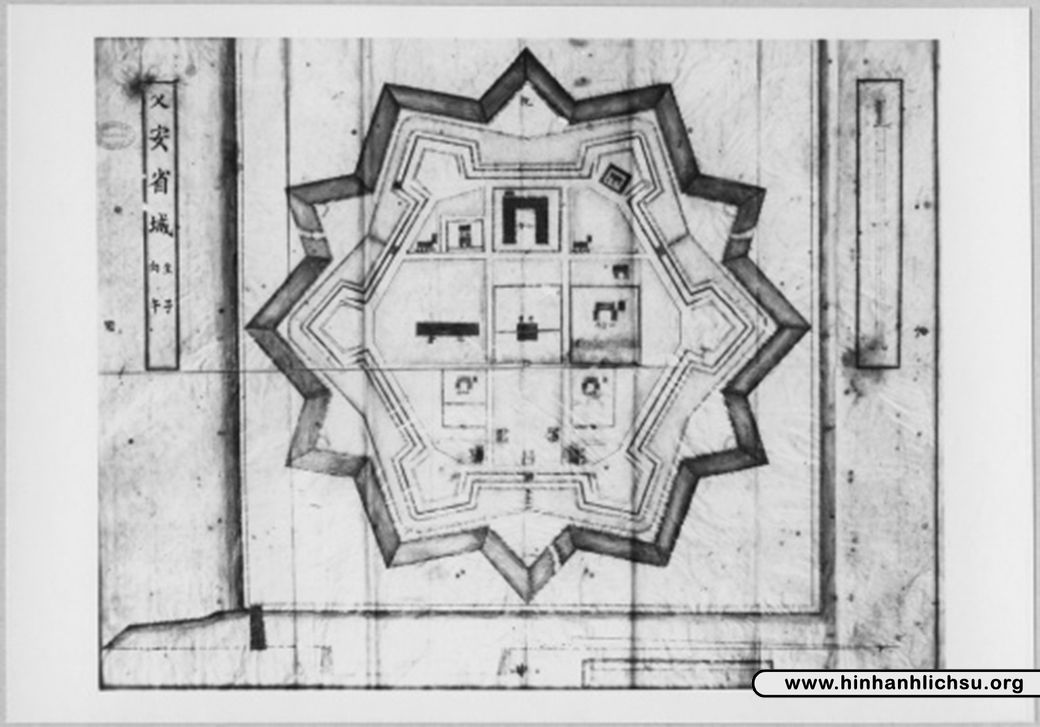
Drawing of Vinh citadel in the Nguyễn dynasty

Vinh was originally known as Ke Van. Later, this successively became Ke Vinh, Vinh Giang, Vinh Doanh, and then Vinh Thi. Eventually, in 1789, the official name became simply Vinh, probably under European influence. The name has remained the same ever since. At various times, Vinh has been of considerable military and political significance. The Vietnamese nation began in the north, and only gradually expanded to cover its current territories – as such, Vinh was sometimes seen as a "gateway to the south".

The Tây Sơn dynasty (1788–1802) is believed to have considered Vinh as a possible capital of Vietnam, but the short duration of the dynasty meant that any plans did not come to fruition. Tây Sơn interest in the city did, however, result in considerable construction and development there. Under French rule of Vietnam, Vinh was further developed as an industrial center, and became well known for its factories.

Historically, Vinh and its surrounding areas have often been important centers of rebellion and revolutionary activity. In the 19th century and the early 20th century, the city was the center of several prominent uprisings against the French. In addition, a number of notable revolutionary figures were born in or near the city of Vinh, including Nguyễn Du, Phan Bội Châu, Trần Trọng Kim, Nguyễn Thị Minh Khai, and Hồ Chí Minh.

The city of Vinh was once the site of a number of significant historic sites, particularly an ancient citadel. Over the years, however, Vinh has been extensively damaged in a number of wars. In the first Indochina war during 1950s, fighting between the French colonial powers and the Việt Minh resistance forces destroyed much of the city, and further damage was done by United States bombing in the Vietnam War. As such, little of the original city remains today. The reconstruction of Vinh borrowed heavily on Soviet and East German ideas about town planning, and was conducted with considerable East German assistance – the city is noted for its wide streets and its rows of concrete apartment blocks.

On December 1, 2024, Cửa Lò town was incorporated into Vinh city.

On June 16, 2025, under the Plan to arrange and merge administrative units in Vietnam 2024–2025, Vinh was divided into six provincial wards, including Trường Vinh, Thành Vinh, Vinh Hưng, Vinh Phú, Vinh Lộc, and Cửa Lò.

On July 1, 2025, Vinh City was abolished.

== Climate ==
Vinh has a tropical monsoon climate bordering closely on a humid subtropical climate (Köppen climate classification Am/Cwa) of the Central Coast.

Climate data for Vinh
Month	Jan	Feb	Mar	Apr	May	Jun	Jul	Aug	Sep	Oct	Nov	Dec	Year
Record high °C (°F)	34.9 (94.8)	35.8 (96.4)	39.1 (102.4)	42.9 (109.2)	41.1 (106.0)	42.1 (107.8)	41.1 (106.0)	39.5 (103.1)	39.9 (103.8)	37.0 (98.6)	36.1 (97.0)	31.6 (88.9)	42.9 (109.2)
Mean daily maximum °C (°F)	20.5 (68.9)	21.0 (69.8)	23.7 (74.7)	28.2 (82.8)	32.4 (90.3)	34.1 (93.4)	34.3 (93.7)	33.0 (91.4)	30.7 (87.3)	27.9 (82.2)	25.1 (77.2)	21.9 (71.4)	27.7 (81.9)
Daily mean °C (°F)	18.1 (64.6)	18.8 (65.8)	21.2 (70.2)	25.2 (77.4)	28.7 (83.7)	30.4 (86.7)	30.5 (86.9)	29.4 (84.9)	27.7 (81.9)	25.2 (77.4)	22.4 (72.3)	19.3 (66.7)	24.7 (76.5)
Mean daily minimum °C (°F)	15.6 (60.1)	16.5 (61.7)	18.7 (65.7)	22.1 (71.8)	25.0 (77.0)	26.7 (80.1)	26.6 (79.9)	25.9 (78.6)	24.6 (76.3)	22.5 (72.5)	19.6 (67.3)	16.6 (61.9)	21.7 (71.1)
Record low °C (°F)	4.0 (39.2)	7.0 (44.6)	7.3 (45.1)	11.4 (52.5)	14.8 (58.6)	19.7 (67.5)	21.5 (70.7)	19.0 (66.2)	16.7 (62.1)	14.3 (57.7)	8.4 (47.1)	5.2 (41.4)	4.0 (39.2)
Average rainfall mm (inches)	52.3 (2.06)	39.7 (1.56)	49.1 (1.93)	62.0 (2.44)	140.9 (5.55)	108.5 (4.27)	122.4 (4.82)	234.2 (9.22)	480.7 (18.93)	514.1 (20.24)	162.8 (6.41)	69.9 (2.75)	2,045.5 (80.53)
Average rainy days	13.3	13.9	14.6	11.0	10.7	8.2	7.8	12.3	14.9	16.3	13.1	11.3	147.6
Average relative humidity (%)	89.3	90.8	90.4	87.8	80.8	74.5	73.7	79.8	85.3	86.7	86.1	85.9	84.2
Mean monthly sunshine hours	68.7	50.9	69.4	131.8	216.3	204.9	219.8	189.3	157.5	127.7	99.4	76.9	1,614.1
Source: Vietnam Institute for Building Science and Technology

== Economy ==
The service sector comprises the largest part of Vinh's economy, with around 55% of the working population being employed in this area. This is followed by the industrial sector (around 30%) and the agriculture, forestry, and fishing sectors (around 15%). Vinh is an important transportation hub, having a key position on the route between the northern and southern parts of the country, and is also a notable port.

=== Tourism ===
Vinh and Nghe An province are rapidly growing tourist destinations on the north central coast of Vietnam, and are home to various attractions. The city features several unique sites including Ho Chi Minh Square, Phuong Hoang Trung Do - Quang Trung Emperor Temple - Dung Quyet Mountain with picturesque and breathtaking scenery of the Lam River - Hong Linh Mountain and Cửa Lò beach. President Ho Chi Minh's hometown, Kim Lien commune, is 10 kilometres (6.2 mi) west of Vinh (in the former Nam Dan district).

Tourists can visit Hon Ngu island, the island is 4 kilometres or 2.5 miles offshore. It consists of 2 islands: the larger stands at 133 metres (436 ft) above sea level and the smaller at 88 metres (289 ft).

- Dung Quyet Mountain (Quyet Mountain) is 5 kilometres or 3.1 miles southeast from centre. Which is an ecological tourist area and bold cultural-historical-Nghe An. Quyet Mountain Park was built on the basis of preserving a cultural heritage-historical over 200 years. It was Phuong Hoang Trung Do Citadel of Quang Trung Emperor.
- Vinpearl Cua Hoi is 10 kilometres or 6.2 miles east of Vinh City. With an area of 38.7 hectares (96 acres), this is a world-class five-star resort with pristine beaches, large artificial pool, water park and other class services.

==== Entertainment ====
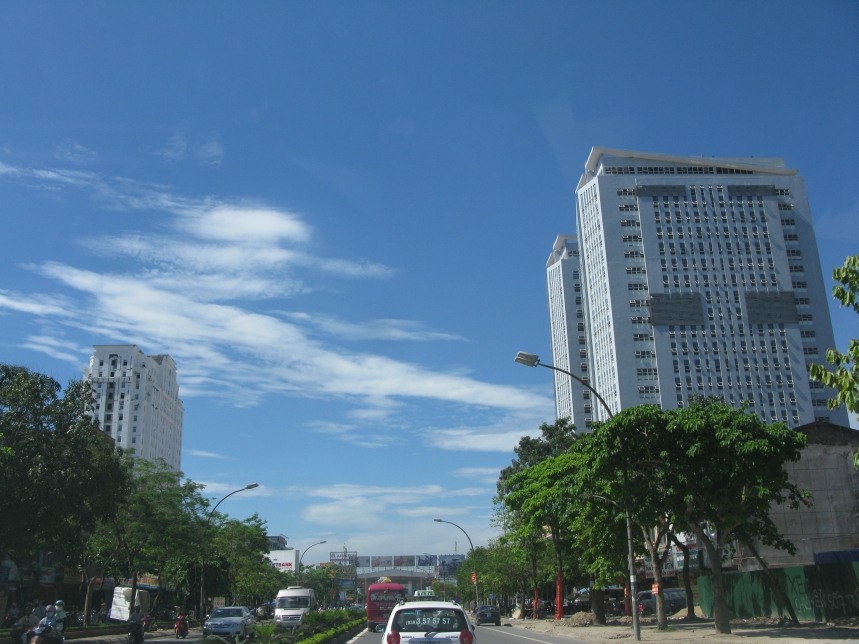
A street in Vinh.

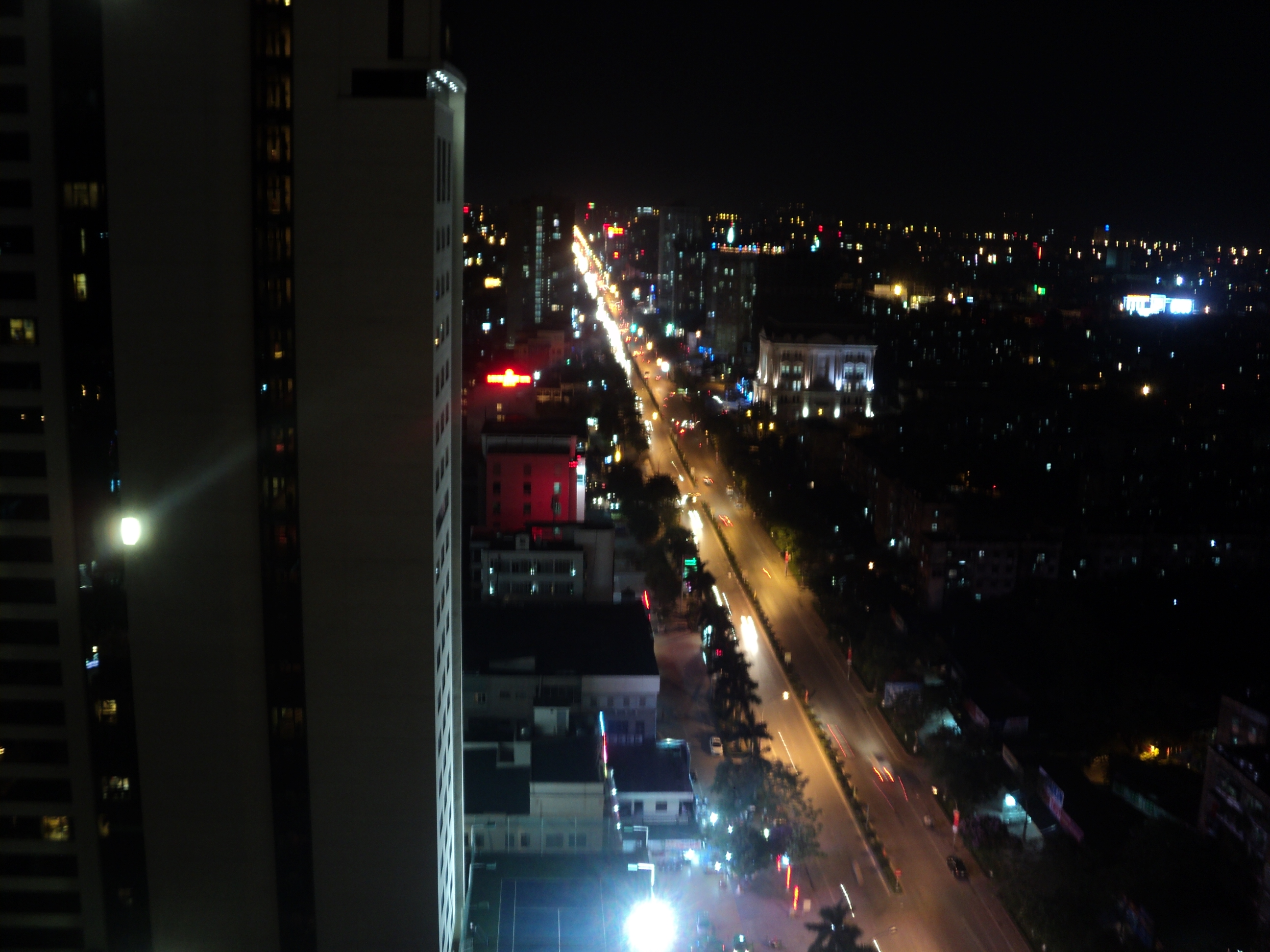
A street in Vinh by night

- Recreation center VRC on Phan Boi Chau street, near Vinh Station. It has a lot of exciting games such as bowling, pool, 4 seasons, racing, fitness, beauty, Lotte Cinema Center ...
- City Hub (1st Le Hong Phong): Complex of entertainment center, Galaxy Cinema, food...
- Film Center North Central of Viet Nam on Quang Trung Street.
- Parks: Centre, Cua Nam, Cua Bac, Nguyen Tat Thanh, Cua Nam lake

==== Museums ====
- Nghe An – Soviet Nghe Tinh Museum (No 10 Dao Tan street):

The museum, built in 1960, displays relics and documents during the uprising of the Nghệ-Tĩnh soviets, preserving over 5,000 original artifacts and documents expressing the spirit of the Nghe Tinh people. In front of the Museum, there is a vestige where President Ho Chi Minh talked with officials and the people of Nghe An when he visited the country in 1957 and the Vinh City Stadium. On the right is Ta Gate, on the left door of the ancient Vinh.This is the place where the original artifacts and the original image of the local movement and collections are shown, such as the drums used in the struggle, the collection of publications, the weapons collection, the collection of children The collection and artifacts of the party cadres and a list of systems of 49 vestiges of the Soviet Union in Nghe An province are classified by the Ministry of Culture and Information as national historical monuments.

- Nghe An General Museum (No 4 Dao Tan street): General Museum introduces the whole country, people, history, culture and continuous activities and typical people of Nghe An from ancient to present. The museum has many artefacts unearthed in Nghe An: archaeological sites of Village Vac, cultural sites of Quynh Van.

The museum has displayed in detail the formation and development of Nghe An inhabitants during the period of history from the ancient Vietnamese who left traces at Tham Tham, Quy Chau district, thousand years, to residents of the culture of Son Vi and Hoa Binh (from 200 thousand years to 9 thousand years ago) and continuously to this day. The history of Nghe An has been richly presented.

- Museum of Military Region 4

== Education ==
- Vinh University
- Vinh Medical University
- Vinh University of Technical Education

Vinh city is the third largest education & training center of the Central - Central Highlands region after Da Nang city and Thua Thien Hue province. Currently, in the city, there are 6 universities, 13 colleges and many branches, along with many professional high schools, vocational training centers and hundreds of schools from high school to preschool. University: 1. Vinh University (1959) - Vietnam's key national university 2. Vinh University - campus 2 3. Vinh University of Technical Education (2006) 4. Van Xuan University of Technology (2008) 5. Vinh Medical University (2010) 6. Vinh Industrial University (2013) 7. Nghe An University of Economics (2014) 8. Industrial University of Ho Chi Minh City, Nghe An Campus (2008) 9. University of Electricity, Central campus.

Total number of students from universities, colleges and intermediate schools: nearly 100,000 people (in 2011).

In the near future, in Vinh city, there will be more regional universities established and upgraded such as: Nghe An University Vinh University of Culture, Arts and Tourism Vietnam - Korea University of Industrial Technology Vietnam Academy of Auditing Vinh University of Economics and Technology Branch 2 - Hanoi University of Civil Engineering,...

== Food ==
There are some unique dishes originating in Vinh and the surrounding areas in Nghe An and Ha Tinh, including cháo lươn (spicy eel soup), bánh mướt (steamed rice rolls), kẹo Cu Đơ (peanut rice paper candy), Vinh orange.

== Architecture ==
Many houses in Vinh have a unique style, heavily influenced by the climate of the region. Many houses have a dome, and a taijitu sign.

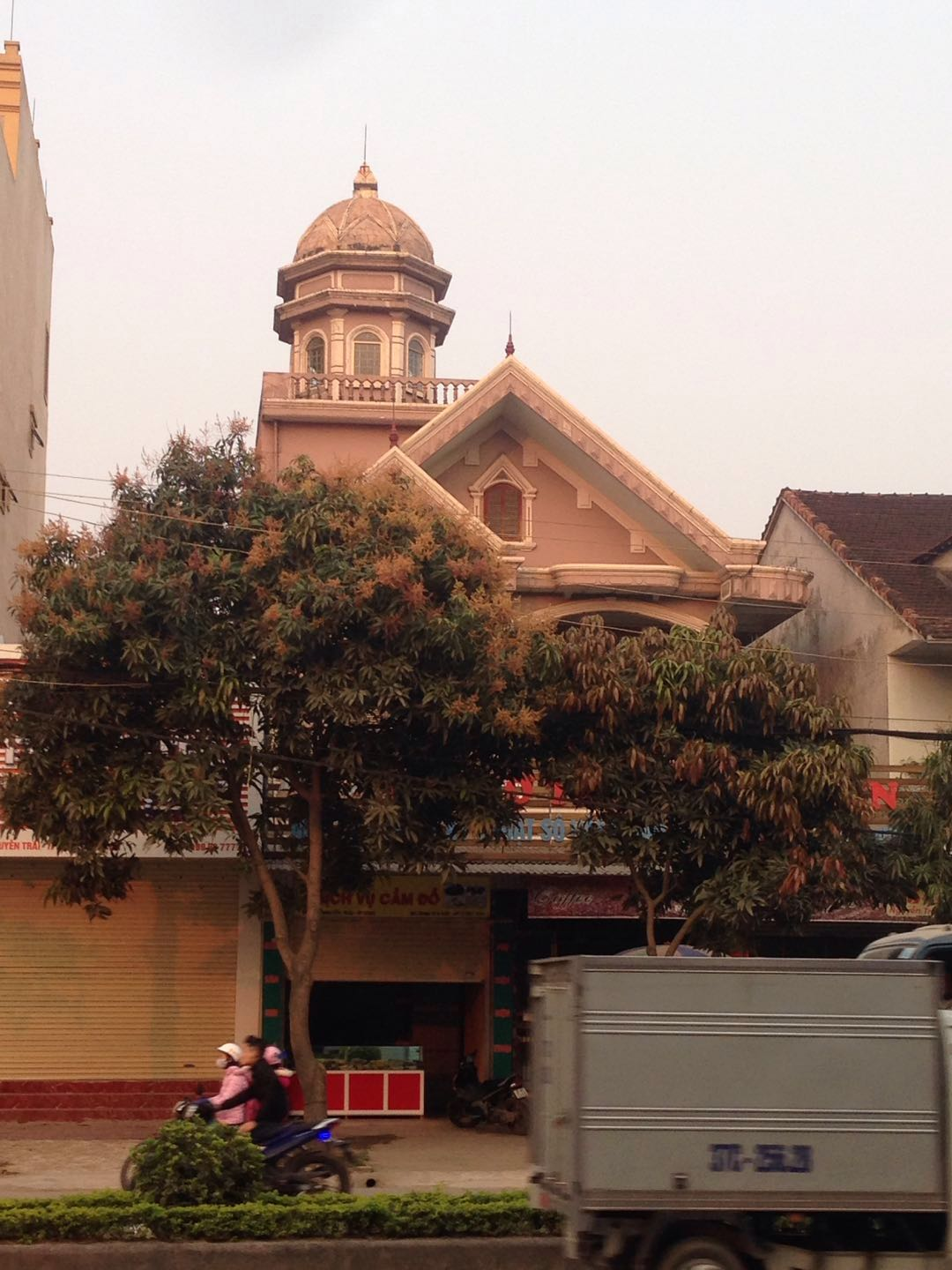
A typical house in Vinh, with dome and taijitu sign

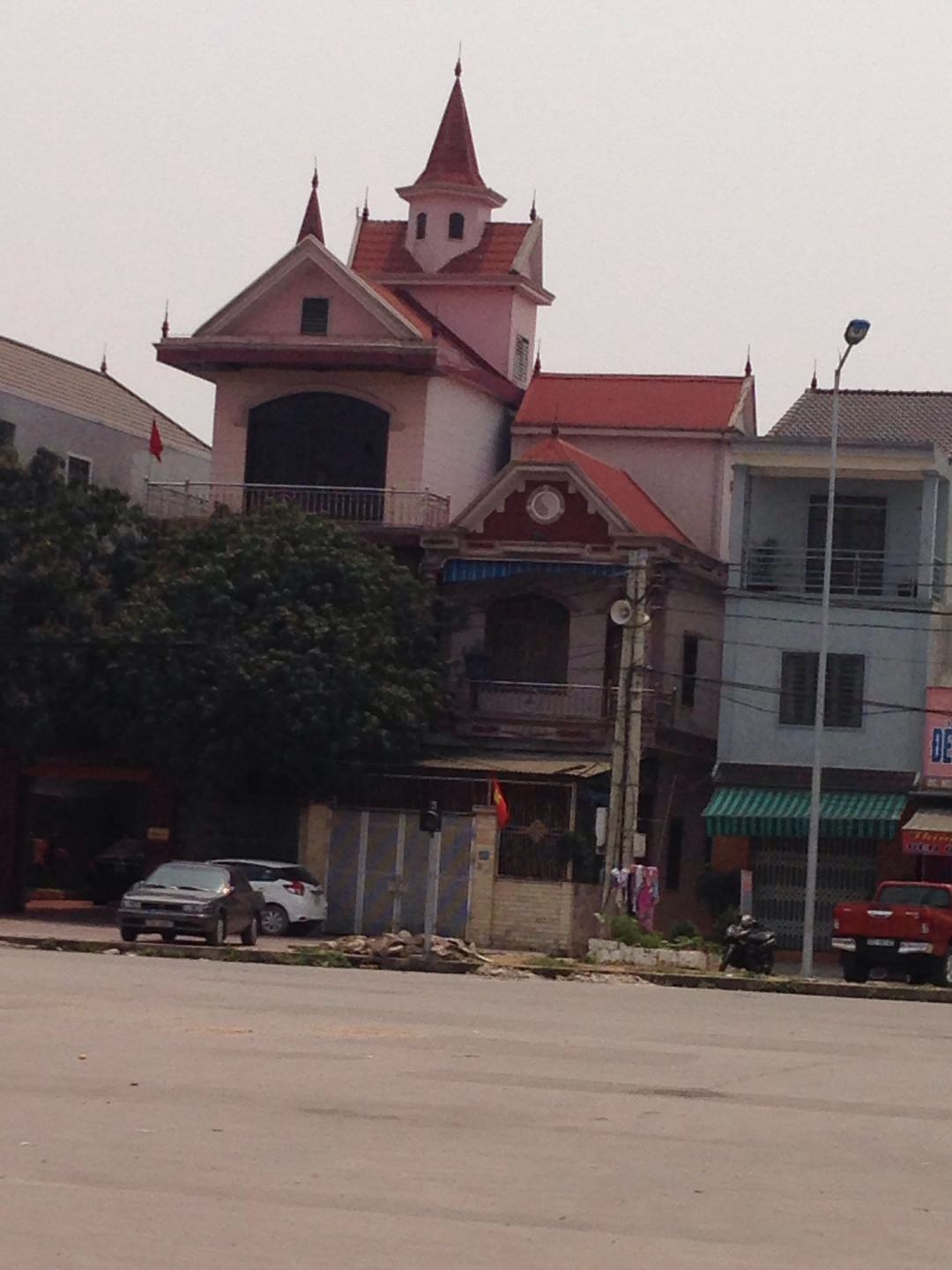
Typical architecture

== Infrastructure ==
=== Airport ===
Vinh International Airport, located at 5 kilometres (3.1 mi) North from the city center, is the fifth busiest airport in Vietnam. The airport has domestic connections to Ho Chi Minh City, Hanoi, Đà Nẵng, Buôn Ma Thuột, Đà Lạt, Nha Trang and Pleiku.

=== Road ===
- National Route 1A to Hanoi, Ho Chi Minh City
- National Route 7 to Luang Prabang
- National Route 8 to Vientiane
- National Route 46 to Vientiane

=== Seaway ===
- Cửa Lò seaport is 15 kilometres or 9 miles from Vinh centre with a capacity 3 million ton per year, Cửa Lò deep seaport is under construction to accommodate vessels of 50,000 DWT- 100,000 DWT, which is a great potential for maritime transport and import and export activities of Nghe An and for the North Central Region
- Vissai seaport includes 2 berths: International wharf area and inland wharf area. The international wharf area consists of 3 wharves for ships of 30,000 to 70,000 DWT. The wharf area of 7 berths will receive the fleet of 3000 ÷ 10,000 DWT.

=== Railway ===
Vinh Station is a major station along the North–South Railway.

=== Bus system ===
There many bus routes in the inner city, neighborhood

=== Industrial zone ===
- WHAIZ 15 to 20 kilometres or 9.3 to 12.4 miles North of Central with the area 3000 hectares
- Nam Cam 15 North of Central with the area 327 hectares or 808 acres
- Bac Vinh with the area 143 hectares or 353 acres
- Cua Lo East of Central with the area 40 hectares or 99 acres

=== Public transportation network ===
In Vinh are three bus stations:

- Bus station in the North: Located in Nghi Lien commune, 7 km (4.3 mi) north of center of Vinh
- Vinh Market bus station (Vietnamese: bến xe chợ vinh), through which it is possible to reach Vientiane by bus.
- Central Bus Station; KM 20 Vinh Road, Block 2, Vinh Tan Ward.
