= Thành Vinh =

Thành Vinh may refer to several places in Vietnam, including:

- Thành Vinh, Nghệ An, a ward of Nghệ An Province
- Thành Vinh, Thanh Hóa, a commune of Thanh Hóa Province
