= Hung Nguyen =

Hung Nguyen may refer to:

== Places ==
- Hưng Nguyên, a township and the capital of Hưng Nguyên District
- Hưng Nguyên District in the North Central Coast region of Vietnam
