= Mitalip Mamytov =

Kyrgyz neurosurgeon

Mitalip Mamytovich Mamytov
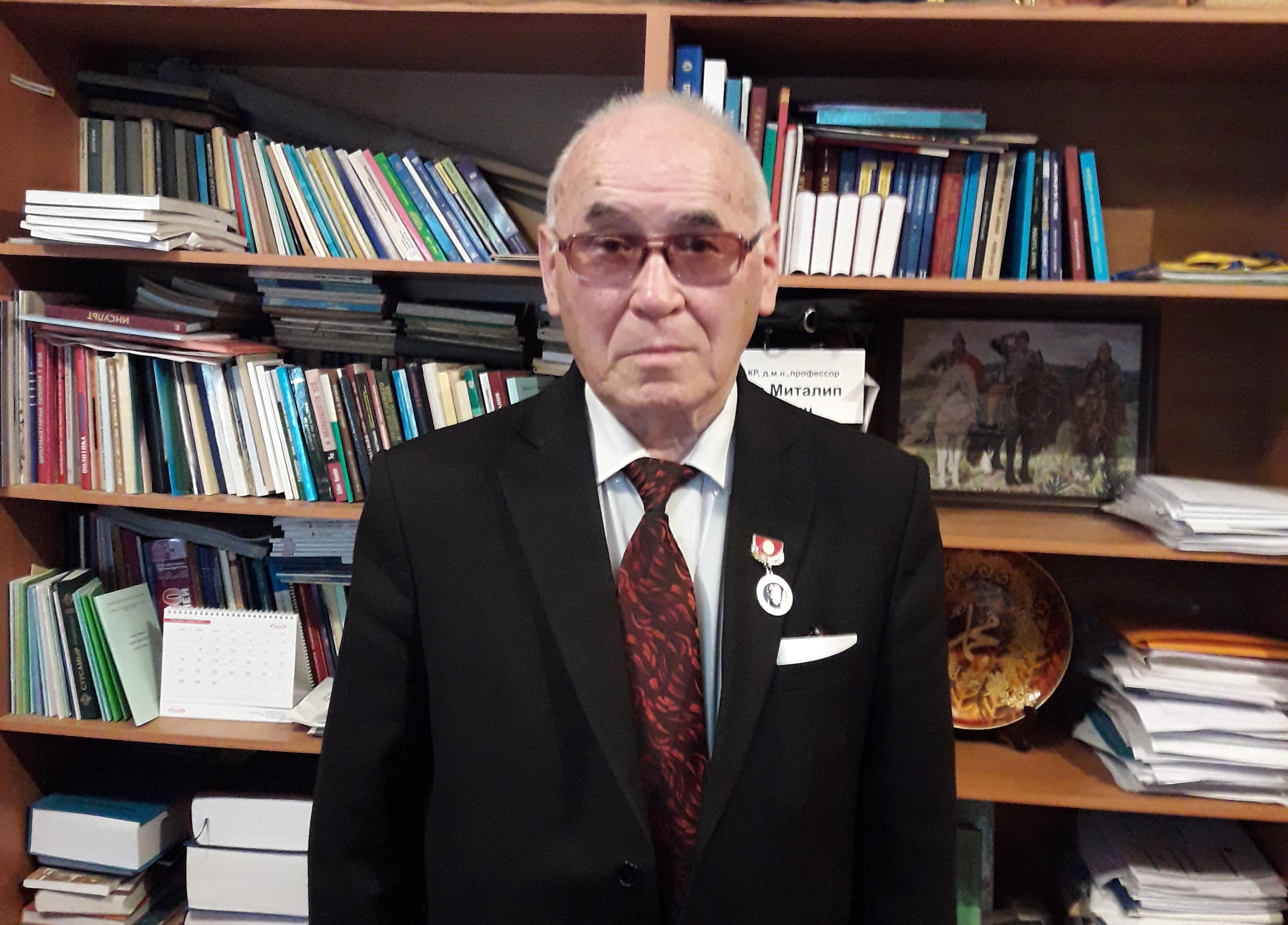
- Born: 16 December 1939 (age 86); Kök-Jar, Nookat, Osh region, Kyrgyzstan
- Citizenship: Kyrgyzstan
- Education: Kyrgyz State Medical Academy
- Scientific career
- Fields: Neurosurgery
- Workplaces: Kyrgyz State Medical Academy

Mitalip Mamytovich Mamytov (Kyrgyz: Миталип Мамытович Мамытов; born 16 December 1939) is a Soviet and Kyrgyz neurosurgeon.

== Biography ==
Mamytov was born on 16 December 1939 in the village of Kök-Jar, Nookat, in the Osh Region of the Kirghiz SSR (modern Kyrgyzstan). His mother raised him after his father died in World War II. He graduated with honors from high school in 1958.

From 1958–1960, he studied at Kyzyl-Kiya Medical College, and from 1960–1966 at Kyrgyz State Medical Academy (KSMA), from which he graduated with honors.

From 1966 to 1971, he completed his clinical residency and postgraduate studies and defended his dissertation on the topic of neurosurgical problems of brain tumors at the A. L. Polenov Leningrad Research Institute of Neurosurgery. He received his Candidate of Sciences diploma in 1972.

From 1971 (or 1972) to 1973, he headed the neurotraumatology department of the Republican Clinical Hospital in Frunze (now Bishkek).

At KSMA, he was an assistant professor from 1973–1976, then an associate professor from 1976–1988. He has been a professor of the academy's Department of Neurology and Neurosurgery since 1998 and is head of the Neurosurgery Department.

He defended his doctoral thesis on neurosurgical problems of brain tumors in 1987 in Kiev, and received the title of Doctor of Sciences in 1988.

From 1997 to 2002, he was Vice-Rector for research at KSMA; from 2002 to 2005 he was Health Minister of Kyrgyzstan, and from 2002 to 2007, he was Rector of the Asian Medical Institute.

He is an academician and member of the presidium of the Kyrgyz Academy of Sciences, the president of the Kyrgyz Neurosurgical Association, an honorary member of the associations of neurosurgeons of Russia, Kazakhstan and Uzbekistan, and Honored Worker of Science of Kyrgyzstan.

== Academic and surgical work ==
As of 2015, he is the author of more than 260 scientific works, including 5 monographs, 8 patents, and 5 textbooks, and the scientific supervisor of 2 doctoral and more than 10 Ph.D. theses.

The subjects of his scientific work have included brain tumors, traumatic brain injuries, herniated intervertebral discs, neurosurgical aspects of inflammatory diseases of the brain, and neurogenic dystrophy of internal organs.

He has performed more than 10,000 operations on the brain and spinal cord.

== Awards ==
- Honored Doctor of the Kyrgyz Republic (1989)
- 1993 – awarded the title Боорукер (lit. 'compassionate') by the Regional Committee of UNESCO.
- Manas anniversary medal (1995)
- In 1997, by decree of the President of Kyrgyzstan No. 45 of 4 February 1997, he was awarded the Dank medal
- In 2002 he was awarded the International Prize "Ruhaniyat" (lit. 'spirituality')
- In 2003 he was awarded the Order of Manas, III degree
- In 2008 he was awarded a World Intellectual Property Organization gold medal
- In 2011, he was awarded the State Prize in the field of science and technology for co-authorship of the work "Optimization of specialized care for hemorrhagic strokes in the Kyrgyz Republic"
- On 30 August 2011 he was awarded the title Hero of the Kyrgyz Republic
- In 2015 he was awarded the Akhunbaev Prize, named after I. K. Akhunbaev, by the Life Giver public fund
- Also in 2015, he was awarded the Alykul Osmonov Medal
- In 2016 he was awarded the Chinghiz Aitmatov Medal
- In 2017 he was awarded a medal "For Merit to KSMA"
- 2022 – Stars of the Commonwealth award from the Interstate Fund for Humanitarian Cooperation of the CIS Member States
