= Vachira Phuket Hospital =

Hospital in Phuket, Thailand

Vachira Phuket Hospital โรงพยาบาลวชิระภูเก็ต
- The Thai Ministry of Public Health Health District 11

Geography
- Location: 353 Yaowarat Road, Talat Yai Subdistrict, Mueang Phuket District, Phuket 83000, Thailand
- Coordinates: 7.896893°N 98.383810°E

Organisation
- Type: Regional
- Affiliated university: School of Medicine, Walailak University

Services
- Beds: 551

History
- Former names: Sukhaphiban Hospital; Vachira Hospital
- Founded: 1 January 1920

Links
- Website: www.vachiraphuket.go.th/index.php
- Lists: Hospitals in Thailand

Vachira Phuket Hospital (Thai: โรงพยาบาลวชิระภูเก็ต) is the main hospital of Phuket Province, Thailand and is classified under the Ministry of Public Health as a regional hospital. It has a CPIRD Medical Education Center which trains doctors for the School of Medicine of Walailak University.

== History ==
The first hospital in Phuket was constructed in 1906 by Phraya Ratsadanupradit, funded by local merchants and citizens and was called Sukhaphiban Hospital. It was located on Komarapat Road and was under the management of Monthon Phuket. Following a state visit by King Vajiravudh in 1917, the king ordered the construction of a newer and more spacious hospital, and this was done so on Yaowarat Road, where the hospital is located today. The hospital was named Vachira Hospital after the King, and was officially opened on 1 January 1920, and its management was assisted by the Faculty of Medicine Vajira Hospital. The hospital was later named Vachira Phuket Hospital to prevent confusion with Vajira Hospital, located in Bangkok. The hospital underwent mass renovation in 1997.

== See also ==
- Healthcare in Thailand
- Hospitals in Thailand
