= WUH =

WUH or wuh may refer to:

- Walailak University Hospital, a university teaching hospital in Tha Sala, Thailand
- WUH, the IATA code for Wuhan Tianhe International Airport, Hubei, China
- wuh, the ISO 639-3 code for Wutun language, China
