= Trang Hospital =

Trang Hospital โรงพยาบาลตรัง
- The Ministry of Public Health Health District 12

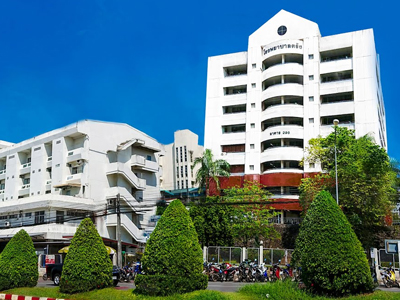

Geography
- Location: 69 Khok Khan Road, Thap Thiang Subdistrict, Mueang Trang District, Trang 92000, Thailand
- Coordinates: 7.572162°N 99.619265°E

Organisation
- Type: Regional
- Affiliated university: School of Medicine, Walailak University; Faculty of Medicine, Prince of Songkla University

Services
- Beds: 553

History
- Opened: 12 April 1954

Links
- Website: www.tranghos.go.th
- Lists: Hospitals in Thailand

Trang Hospital (Thai: โรงพยาบาลตรัง) is the main hospital of Trang Province, Thailand and is classified under the Ministry of Public Health as a regional hospital. It has a CPIRD Medical Education Center which trains doctors of the School of Medicine, Walailak University and is an affiliated teaching hospital of the Faculty of Medicine, Prince of Songkla University.

== History ==
In the early 1950s, Trang only had a health station in the city center (now the location of Trang Hotel) and its operations were transferred to the Ministry of Public Health in 1951. Limited space meant expanding the hospital was difficult, so plans were proposed to build a new hospital on a 53 rai land of the Royal Treasury at Khuan Han. Construction began in 1951 and the hospital was opened on 12 April 1954 with a capacity of 25 beds. Locals called it 'Khuan Han Hospital' due to its location. In 1974, Trang Hospital became a general hospital with a capacity of 280 beds, and eventually became a regional hospital in 1997.

== See also ==
- Healthcare in Thailand
- Hospitals in Thailand
- List of hospitals in Thailand
