= Kök-Jar, Nookat =

Kök-Jar Көк-Жар
- Location within Kyrgyzstan
- Coordinates: 40°17′56″N 72°22′26″E
- Country: Kyrgyzstan
- Region: Osh Region
- District: Nookat District
- Elevation: 1,250 m (4,100 ft)

Population (2021)
  - Total: 3,573

Kök-Jar (Kyrgyz: Көк-Жар, Russian: Кок-Джар) is a village in the southwest of Nookat District, Osh Region, Kyrgyzstan. Its population was 3,573 in 2021. Mitalip Mamytov, who performed the first brain surgery in Kyrgyzstan, was born in Kök-Jar.
