= Haiphong University =

Coordinates: 20.8398°N 106.6879°E

- Administrative staff: 712
- Location: Haiphong
- Campus: 171 Phan Đăng Lưu, Kiến An district, Haiphong, Vietnam
- Website: https://dhhp.edu.vn/

Haiphong University (Vietnamese: Trường Đại học Hải Phòng) is a public university established on 22 July 1959 in Haiphong. In 2000, this university was merged with some other higher institutions in Haiphong to become Haiphong University of Education. On 9 April 2004, the Prime Minister of Vietnam signed edict 60/2004/QĐ-TTg, to rename this university Haiphong University.

== Formation and Development ==
Hai Phong University, as it stands today, is the result of merging several educational institutions in Hai Phong, with its first predecessor being Hai Phong Intermediate Teacher Training School. Established on July 22, 1959, by Decree No. 359-ND of the Minister of Education, the school aimed to train secondary teachers for the provinces of Hai Duong, Hai Phong, Kien An (now Hai Phong City), Hong Quang, and Hai Ninh (now Quang Ninh Province).

After its founding, the school focused on training and improving the qualifications of general education teachers, actively contributing to educational development in the early years of socialist construction in the North and the fight against U.S. forces, leading to the liberation and reunification of Vietnam. The teacher training system in Hai Phong evolved, offering programs from elementary and intermediate levels to associate degrees.

In 2000, the Prime Minister decided to establish Hai Phong Pedagogical University by merging Hai Phong College of Education, Hai Phong Continuing Education University, Hai Phong Education Management and Teacher Training School, and Hai Phong Foreign Language Center. On April 9, 2004, Decision No. 60/2004/QD-TTg by the Prime Minister officially renamed it Hai Phong University

== Staff ==
As of October 2017, the university had 462 lecturers, including 5 associate professors, 68 PhDs, 321 master's degree holders, and 70 lecturers with bachelor's degrees.

== University Council ==
- Chairperson: Nguyễn Thị Hiên (Party Secretary)

== Board of Directors ==
- Rector: Associate Professor Dr. Bùi Xuân Hải
- Vice Rectors:
  - Dr. Nguyễn Thị Thanh Nhàn
  - Dr. Trần Quốc Tuấn

== Department Heads ==
- Head of Personnel: Dr. Vũ Đức Văn
- Head of Training and International Cooperation: MSc. Khoa Việt Cường
- Head of Training: Dr. Trần Văn Trọng
- Head of Postgraduate Training: Dr. Nguyễn Văn Quyền
- Head of Scientific Management: Associate Professor Dr. Bùi Bà Khiêm
- Head of Politics - Student Affairs: Dr. Phạm Đức Cường
- Head of Inspection and Legal Affairs: MSc. Đỗ Thị Ngọc Thắng
- Head of Examination and Quality Assurance: Dr. Đỗ Thị Thanh Toàn
- Acting Head of Financial Planning: MSc. Phan Thị Thu Hương
- Chief of Office: MSc. Phạm Khánh Toàn

== Departments, Institutes, Offices, and Stations ==
- 14 Departments: Including Electrical - Mechanical, Mathematics, Information Technology, Tourism, Natural Sciences, Literature and Geography, Foreign Languages, Physical Education - Sports, Primary and Preschool Education, Political Theory, Psychology - Education, Economics and Business Administration, Accounting - Finance, and Construction.
- 1 Institute: Institute of Agricultural Biology, formerly Institute of Training and Research for Agricultural Development (renamed in August 2014).
- 5 Centers: Information and Library Center, Foreign Language Center, Training and Professional Development Center, National Defense and Security Education Center, and Continuing Education Center.
- 11 Offices/Divisions: Include Personnel, Training, Science and Technology, Postgraduate Management, International Cooperation, Administration, Finance, Student Affairs, Examination and Quality Assurance, Inspection and Legal Affairs, and Construction Project Management.
- 3 Practice Schools: Practical Preschool, Practical Primary School, and Phan Dang Luu School

== Facilities ==
Hai Phong University has three campuses, with the main campus located in Kien An District, and two additional campuses in Ngo Quyen District.

1. Main Campus: 171 Phan Dang Luu Street, Kien An District. This site houses the university's administration, various academic departments, lecture halls, a central library, and a student dormitory, covering a planned area of 28 hectares.
2. Professional Development Center: 246A Da Nang Street, Ngo Quyen District.
3. Foreign Language Training Center: 49 Tran Phu Street, Ngo Quyen District.

The university spans over 28.76 hectares and includes 263 classrooms, 35 laboratories, a sports complex, a dormitory accommodating over 1,500 students, and a healthcare center.

== See also ==
- Hai Phong Medical University
