= Mental health in Kyrgyzstan =

Social parameter in Kyrgyzstan

A 2024 study estimated that approximately 11% of Kyrgyzstan's population lives with a mental illness

Mental health in Kyrgyzstan encompasses the prevalence, treatment, as well as social and economic effects of mental illness in Kyrgyzstan. It has been estimated that approximately 11% of the country's population lives with a mental health condition, which coupled with a lack of adequate mental health services, has resulted in a range of negative outcomes for Kyrgyzstani society.

== Legislation ==
The 1999 Psychiatric Care Law remains the current law governing most aspects of mental health care in Kyrgyzstan. Furthermore, the State Guarantee Program ensures that the government will cover at least 80% the cost of psychiatric medications.

== Epidemiology ==
A 2024 study conducted by the Ministry of Health found that approximately 11% of Kyrgyzstan's population met the criteria for a mental illness, with depression, alcohol use disorder and anxiety being the most common mental health conditions:

Condition	Male (%)	Female (%)
Any mental health condition	11.1	10.9
Depressive disorders	2.6	4.0
Alcohol use disorder	5.0	1.3
Anxiety disorders	1.6	2.6

== Youth Mental Health ==
The first study to assess youth mental health in Kyrgyzstan was carried out in 2022 by the National Center for Maternal and Child Health, with the support of the World Health Organisation (WHO) and United Nations Children's Fund.

=== Bullying ===
32% of children surveyed indicated being victims of bullying, while 28% of children admitted to bullying others. Cyberbullying was found to be less prevalent than face to face bullying.

=== Depression ===
33.6% of children surveyed said they felt so sad or hopeless almost every day for two or more weeks in a row in the last 12 months that they stopped doing some normal activities, with the highest prevalence being among girls aged 15 (47.7%).

=== Suicide ===
16.1% of children surveyed reported experiencing suicidal thoughts in the 12 months prior to the survey. 12.1% planned to attempt suicide and 2.7% of those surveyed attempted suicide. The highest prevalence of suicidal ideation as well as attempts was among 15 year old girls, with 24.2% of children in this demographic considering suicide.

== Economic effects ==
A 2024 study found that mental illness is responsible for economic losses totalling 3.97 billion som, with 352 million som in losses due to healthcare expenses and 3.62 billion som due to reduced productivity in the form of absenteeism and presenteeism.
