= Trường Vinh =

Trường Vinh Phường Trường Vinh
- Ward
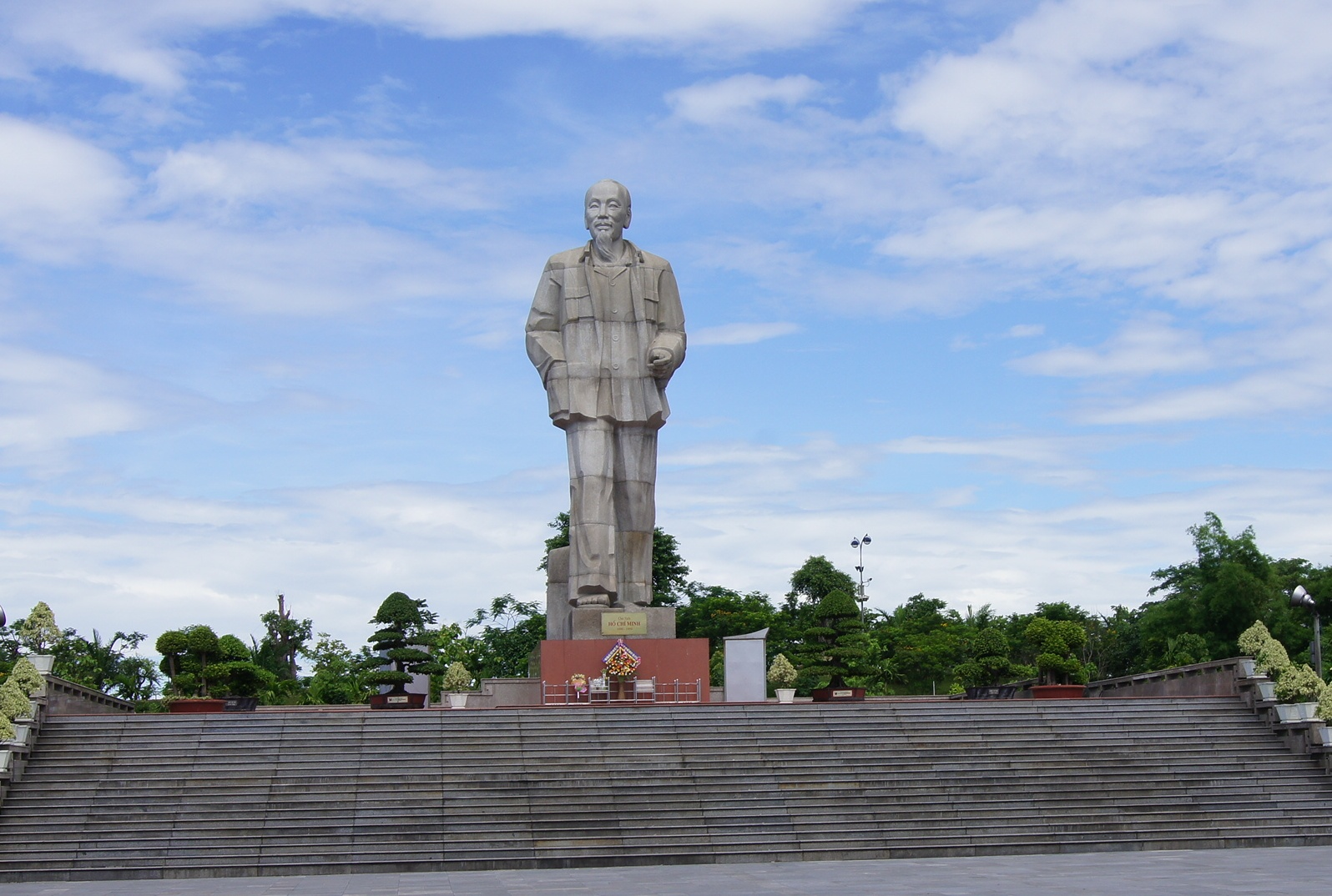
- Ho Chi Minh Square
- Interactive map of Trường Vinh
- Location in Vietnam
- Country: Vietnam
- Regions: North Central Coast
- Province: Nghệ An Province
- Established: June 16, 2025

Area
  - Total: 34.22 km^{2} (13.21 sq mi)

Population (2025)
  - Total: 141,477
  - Density: 4,134/km^{2} (10,710/sq mi)
- Time zone: UTC+07:00 (Indochina Time)

Trường Vinh is a ward (phường) of Nghệ An Province, Vietnam. It is the capital of Nghệ An Province.

== Geography ==
Trường Vinh Ward located in southeastern Nghệ An Province, and adjacent to:

- Thành Vinh Ward, Vinh Phú Ward and Vinh Lộc Ward to the north
- Hưng Nguyên Commune and Hà Tĩnh Province to the south
- Thành Vinh Ward and Hưng Nguyên Commune to the west
- Hà Tĩnh Province to the east.

== History ==
On June 16, 2025, the Standing Committee of the National Assembly of Vietnam issued Resolution No. 1678/NQ-UBTVQH15 on the arrangement of commune-level administrative units of Nghệ An Province in 2025 (effective from June 16, 2025). Accordingly, the entire land area and population of Bến Thủy, Hưng Dũng, Hưng Phúc, Trung Đô, Trường Thi, Vinh Tân Wards, and Hưng Hòa Commune were merged to form a new ward named Trường Vinh Ward.
