= School of Medicine, Walailak University =

School of Medicine

- สำนักวิชาแพทยศาสตร์ มหาวิทยาลัยวลัยลักษณ์
- Type: Public (non-profit)
- Established: 11 March 2006 (set up)
- Parent institution: Walailak University
- Dean: Dr. Prachyapan Petchuay, M.D., Ph.D.
- Location: 222 Vicharkarn Building 9, Thai Buri Subdistrict, Tha Sala District, Nakhon Si Thammarat 80160, Thailand; 8.637833°N 99.898586°E
- Colors: Green
- Website: https://smd.wu.ac.th/en/home/

The School of Medicine, Walailak University (Thai: สำนักวิชาแพทยศาสตร์ มหาวิทยาลัยวลัยลักษณ์) is a medical school in Tha Sala District, Nakhon Si Thammarat Province.

== History ==
In 2004, by support from the citizens of Nakhon Si Thammarat Province, a project to improve healthcare in the province was proposed to the cabinet. On 11 March 2006, the Walailak University Council, along with the Collaborative Project to Increase Production of Rural Doctor (CPIRD), the Ministry of Public Health (MOPH), the school of Medicine was set up and the Doctor of Medicine degree was approved by the Medical Council of Thailand. On 27 November 2006, the school made an agreement with the Faculty of Medicine, Chulalongkorn University for it to act as a mentoring institution for the school. The school was officially opened on 24 September 2007, initially opening admission for 48 students from Nakhon Si Thammarat, Trang and Phuket Provinces only, for the 2008 academic year. This quota was extended to Krabi and Phang-Nga Provinces in the 2015 academic year.

== Teaching Hospitals ==
- Walailak University Hospital
- Vachira Phuket Hospital (CPIRD)
- Trang Hospital (CPIRD)

== See also ==
- List of medical schools in Thailand
