= Kakish Ryskulova =

Kyrgyz surgeon (1918–2018)

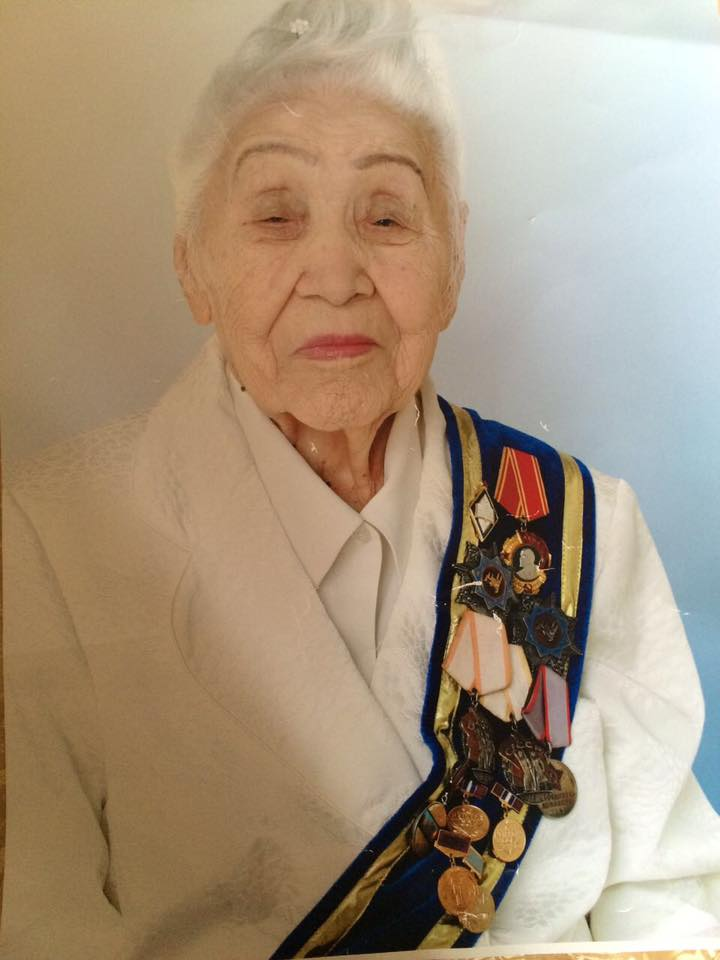
- Born: 15 October 1918; Chetindi, Chüy Region, Kyrgyzstan
- Died: 26 August 2018 (aged 99)
- Citizenship: Kyrgyzstan
- Occupations: Surgeon, politician
- Known for: First woman surgeon in Kyrgyzstan
- Medical career
- Field: Vascular surgery
- Institutions: Kyrgyz State Medical Academy

Kakish Ryskulova, (Kyrgyz: Какиш Рыскулова; 5 October 1918 (Note: While this date of birth is reported, at her death the majority of sources report that Ryskulova was already 100 years of age.) – 26 August 2018) was a Kyrgyz medical doctor and politician, who was an Academician of the Kyrgyz Academy of Sciences. She was the first Central Asian and first Kyrgyz woman to become a surgeon.

== Biography ==
Ryskulova was born on 15 October 1918 in the village of Chetindi, Ysyk-Ata district, Chuy oblast. An orphan by the age of ten, her uncle, Ishenali Arabaev, encouraged her to apply to go to boarding school; it was her uncle who also encouraged her to eventually apply to go to medical college. She began to study nursing at Frunze Medical School in 1936. After she left the medical school she worked as a paramedic in Batken, and as a nurse in Naryn. In 1940, Ryskulova began to study at the medical faculty of the Kyrgyz State Medical Academy, which she graduated from in 1944. Study there enabled her to move to graduate school, where she was the first woman from central Asia to become a surgeon. Two other Kyrgyz people to become surgeons alongside Ryskulova were I.K. Akhunbaev and Zyfar Egemberdieva.

In 1951, she graduated with a DPhil in Medicine. Her doctoral dissertation was on vascular surgery. The research for this project began several years earlier, after she graduated and began to treat patients who were wounded in the Second World War. Her dissertation was entitled "Blood vessels and nerves of the arterial and venous wall scar following mechanical and manual suturing: An experimental study". Through her research she developed a new technique for repairing veins and arteries and continued to specialise in vascular medicine, as well as working in a variety of other disciplines. In 1968 she was awarded the title of Professor of Medicine. In 1969 she was appointed as an academician of the Kyrgyz Academy of Sciences. Prior to her retirement, she was Head of the Faculty of Medicine for thirty-five years. Ryskulova also was elected as a deputy of the Supreme Soviet of the Kirghiz SSR and was a member of the Central Committee of the Communist Party of Kirghiz SSR.

Ryskulova died on 26 August 2018. Her funeral was held on 28 August at the Kyrgyz Drama Theatre. Her official obituary was signed by the President of Kyrgyzstan Sooronbay Jeenbekov.

== Legacy ==
Ryskulova authored over 250 scientific papers, 13 monographs, four textbooks, and 11 inventions. The Department of Surgery at the Kyrgyz State Medical Academy is named after Ryskulova, in honour of her achievements.

== Awards and honours ==
- Honoured Scientist of the Kyrgyz Republic.
- Honoured Doctor of the Kyrgyz Republic.
- Academician of the Kyrgyz Academy of Sciences.
- Order of Lenin.
- Order of Dank.
- Order of Manas.
- Order of the Badge of Honour x2
- Medal "For Labour Valour"

== Personal life ==
Ryskulova was married to Omorkul Suleymanov. They had two daughters, and also adopted two of her nephews. All are doctors, apart from her daughter Anara Suleymanova, who was a professional ballerina.

== Gallery ==
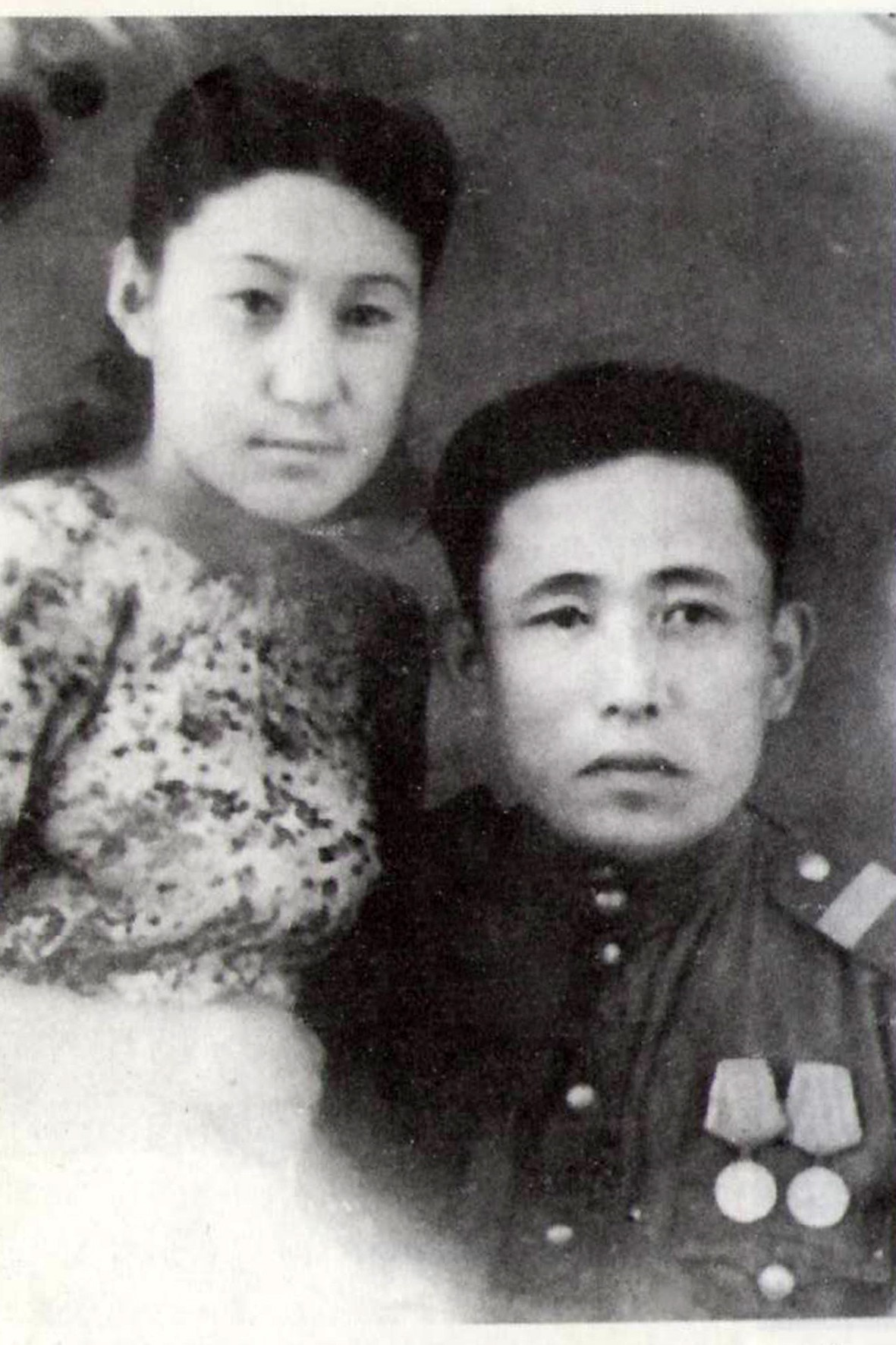
With her husband

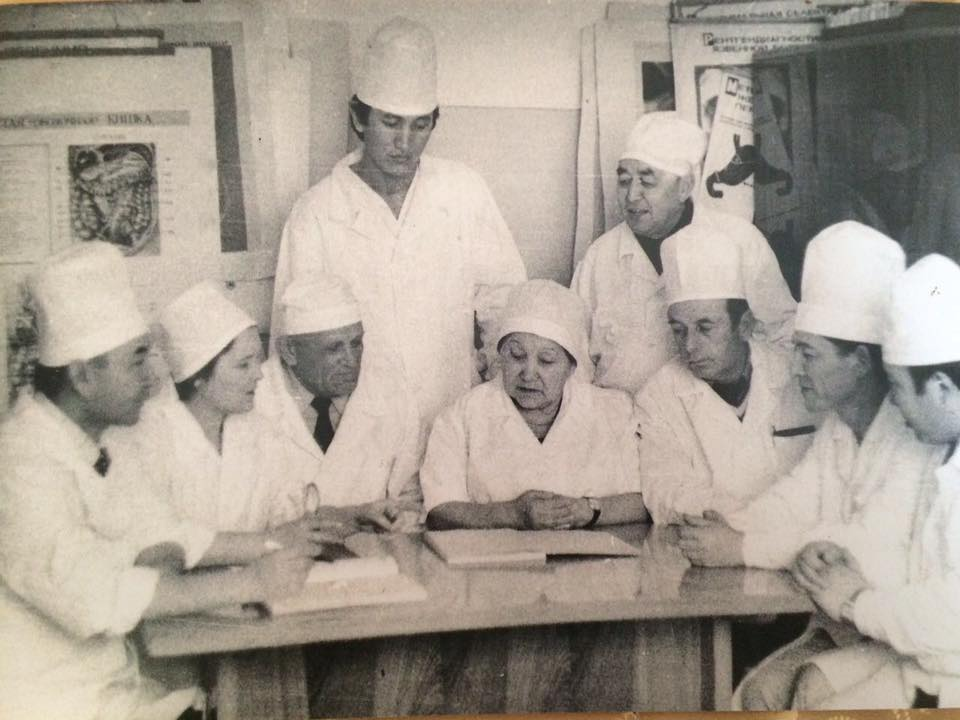
Teaching

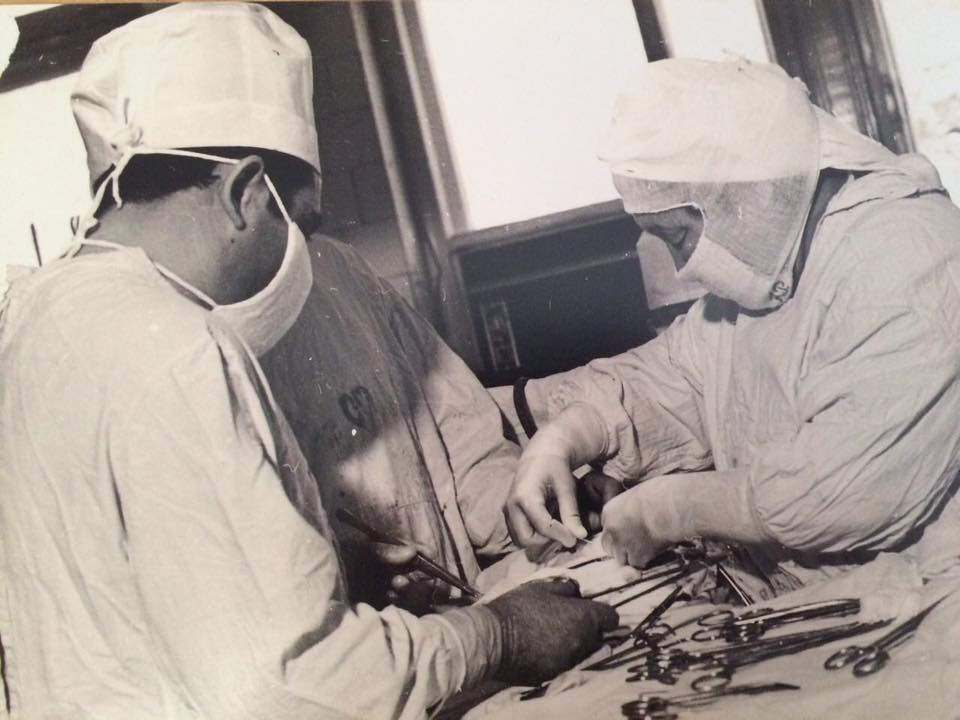
In surgery

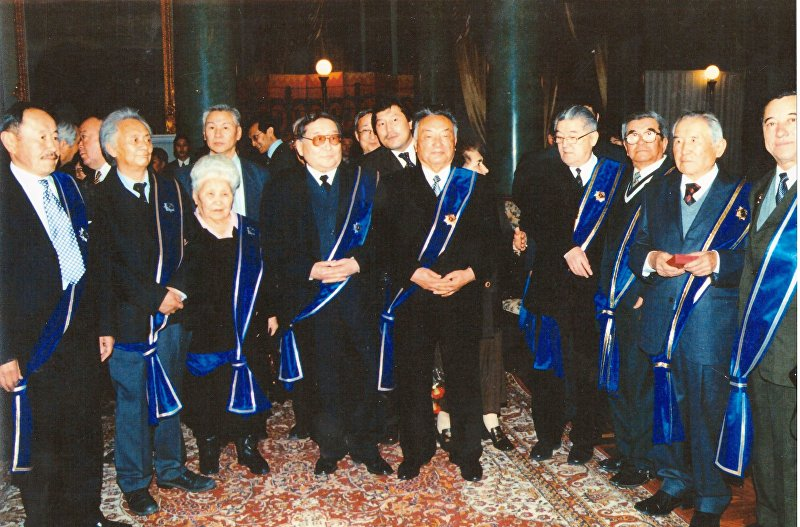
With other members of the Academy of Sciences
