= Cửa Lò =

- Ward
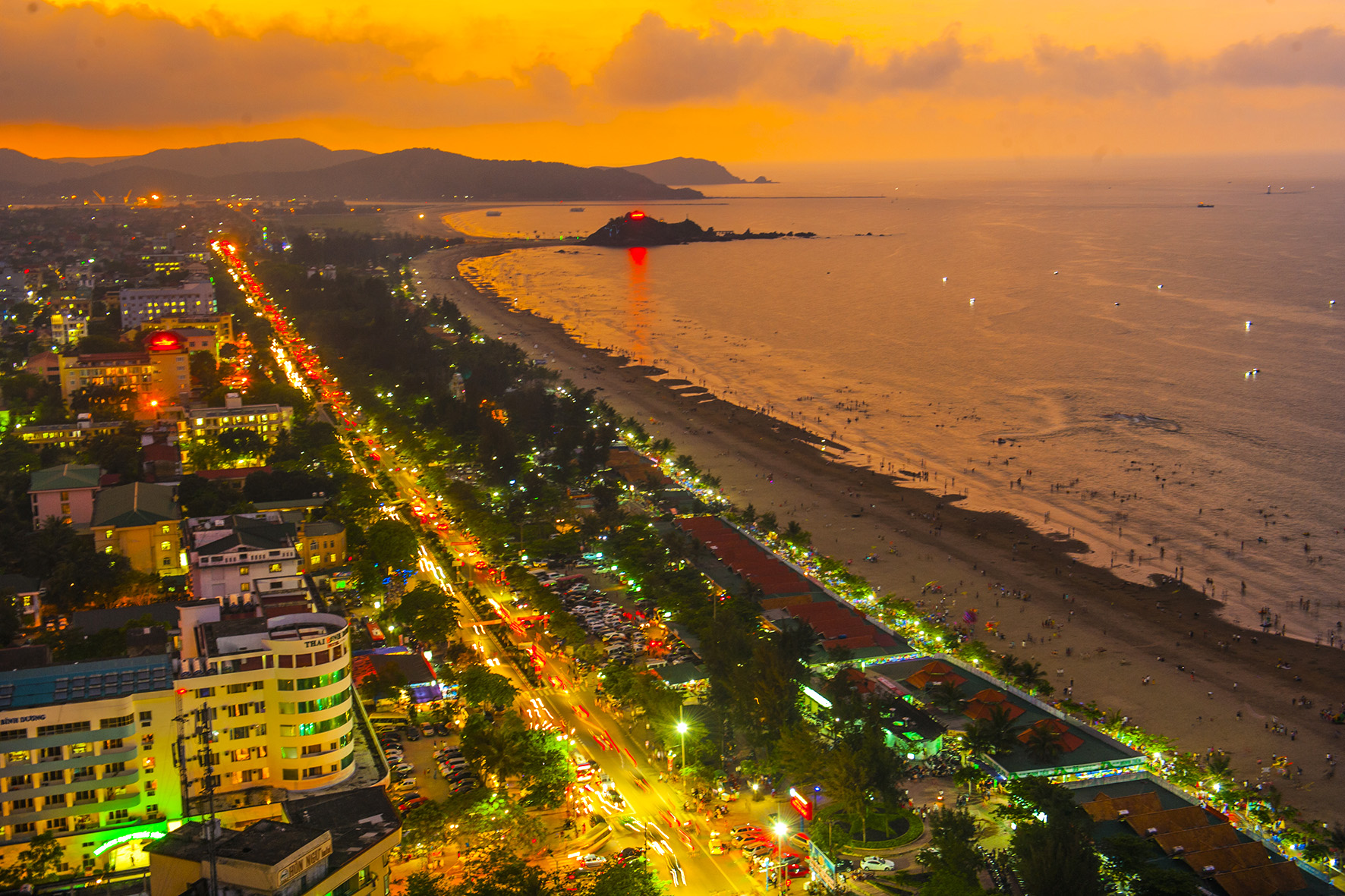
- Cửa Lò Beach at night
- Interactive map of Cửa Lò
- Coordinates: 18.796542582231694°N 105.7276777827709°E
- Country: Vietnam
- Region: North Central Coast
- Province: Nghệ An
- Established: 16 June 2025

Area
  - Total: 29.09 km^{2} (11.23 sq mi)

Population (2025)
  - Total: 64,760
  - Density: 2,226/km^{2} (5,770/sq mi)
- Website: cualo.nghean.gov.vn

Cửa Lò is a coastal ward in Nghệ An province, Vietnam. The ward inherited its name from Cửa Lò town, which existed until 1 December 2024. The ward's territory is coterminous with that of the former Cửa Lò town.

On 16 June 2025, the Standing Committee of the National Assembly of Vietnam issued Resolution No. 1678/NQ-UBTVQH15, under which the entire area and population of Nghi Hải, Nghi Hòa, Nghi Hương, Nghi Tân, Nghi Thu, Nghi Thủy, and Thu Thủy wards of Vinh were merged to form a new ward named Cửa Lò.

== History ==
As of 2018 the Cửa Lò Town (thị xã Cửa Lò) had a population of 75,260. The Cửa Lò town covers an area of 28 km^{2} and it is located 290 km south of Hanoi, 1400 km north of Ho Chi Minh City. On 4 June 2024, Cửa Lò with four communes of Nghi Lộc district has merged into Vinh.

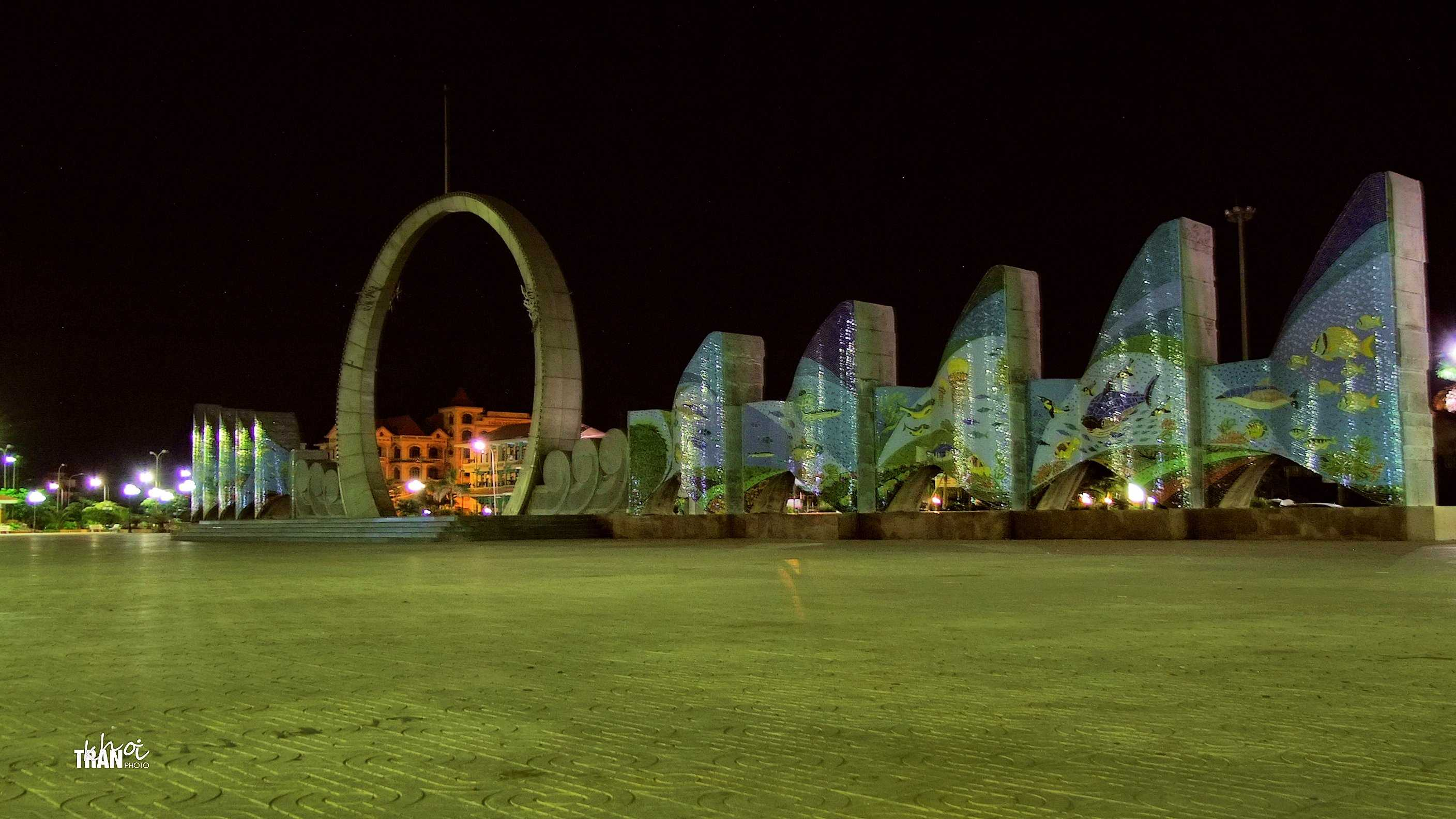
The symbol of Cửa Lò on Binh Minh Square.

On October 24, 2024, the National Assembly Standing Committee issued Resolution No. 1243/NQ-UBTVQH15 on the arrangement of administrative units at district and commune levels of Nghệ An in the period of 2023–2025 and in effect from December 1, 2024, to present, merging all 29,09 km2 of natural area and population size of 11,884 people of Cửa Lò Town into Vinh city.

== Culture ==
Under the aid of the SEV block in the 1980s, Cửa Lò went from a poor fishing village to become the leading eco-tourism and resort area in Vietnam. There are many beautiful scenes landscapes this district.

=== Tourism ===
Vạn Lộc Village

The festival of Vạn Lộc Village takes place every year very well to honour the fishing profession and celebrate the harvest of bumper fish.

Song Ngư Island

Song Ngư Island ("two fish") is located in the sea, more than 4 km from the shore. The island consists of two small islands. The higher island is 133 m above sea level at its highest, with the lower island being 88 m above sea level at its highest. It has an area of 2.5 km^{2}, convenient for sightseeing. On the island there is the so-called Bai Pagoda, built in the 13th century with pagodas and temples; the temple has an upper pagoda and a lower pagoda, and each pagoda has 3 roofs with yin and yang; the beams are carved with sacred objects (dragons, unicorns, turtles and phoenixes), while the garden has many natural green trees such as porcelain trees, fish poison trees, duoi trees and a fresh water well called Jade Gem. The temple has two fish poison trees, both about 700 years old. Currently, there is a project to build a cable car that will connect the island to the mainland.

Cửa Hội

Located 5 km from Cửa Lò along the beach, Cửa Hội is the place where the Lam River flows into the sea. From here, Hòn Ngư Island can be seen directly. This area is full of casuarina, and the sea here is still uncontaminated and quiet different from the busier atmosphere in Cửa Lò from Cửa Hội. It is possible to follow the Lam river bank through the Cham forest (where there is rich vegetation and animal species such as birds and reptiles).

Bãi Lữ

Bãi Lữ is a resort that contains sea, mountains and a forest.

Besides : Cửa Lò Beach, Lan Châu Isle (or Toad Mountain), Cấm River, Temple of Duke Nguyễn Xí...

=== Traffic ===
There are five roads connecting Cửa Lò and the center of Vinh, the capital of Nghệ An. Tourists can take the bus (Number 1) to the center square of the city.

Besides, Vinh International Airport is located 14 km from Cửa Lò, and is the fifth busiest airport in Vietnam. From this airport there are flights to and from Ho Chi Minh City, Hanoi, Nha Trang, Da Nang, Buôn Ma Thuột, Pleiku and a few international flights connecting Vientiane and Bangkok.

== See also ==
- Diễn Châu
- Quỳnh Lưu
