= Walailak University Hospital =

Walailak University Hospital โรงพยาบาลศูนย์การแพทย์มหาวิทยาลัยวลัยลักษณ์

Geography
- Location: 222 Mu 10, Thai Buri Subdistrict, Tha Sala District, Nakhon Si Thammarat 80160, Thailand
- Coordinates: 8.643658°N 99.914317°E

Organisation
- Type: Teaching
- Affiliated university: School of Medicine, Walailak University

Services
- Beds: 30

History
- Opened: 24 February 2017

Links
- Website: hospital.wu.ac.th
- Lists: Hospitals in Thailand

Walailak University Hospital (Thai: โรงพยาบาลศูนย์การแพทย์มหาวิทยาลัยวลัยลักษณ์) is a university teaching hospital, affiliated to the School of Medicine of Walailak University, located in Tha Sala District, Nakhon Si Thammarat Province.

== History ==
The construction of Walailak University Hospital was proposed in 2011 and funding of 5.2 billion Baht was allocated in 2016 and construction started in March 2016. The first phase of the hospital opened on 24 February 2017. Construction for all six planned buildings is expected to be completed in 2020 and will expand to a capacity of 750 beds. 4 specialist medical centers will be completed which are: the Cardiac Center, Cancer Center, Skin Center and Elderly Center. Walailak University Hospital aims to be the future referral hospital for regional, general and community hospitals located in the upper Southern Thailand.

== See also ==
- Health in Thailand
- Hospitals in Thailand
- List of hospitals in Thailand
