= Hưng Nguyên district =

Coordinates: 18.583°N 105.633°E

Hưng Nguyên district Huyện Hưng Nguyên
- District
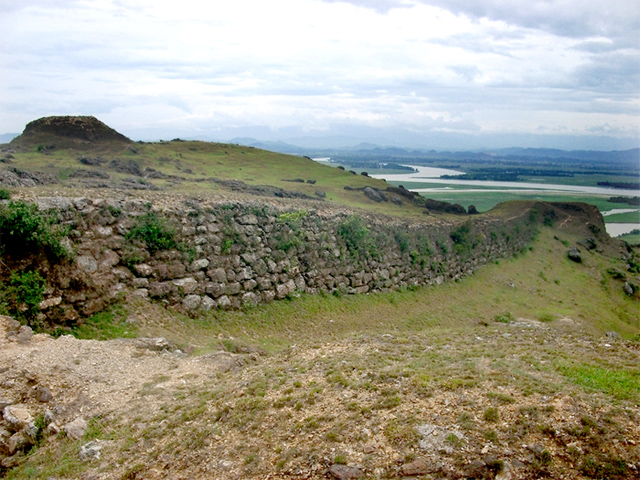
- A section of citadel on Lâm Thanh mountain, overlooking the front are Lam River and Hong Linh Mountain. The plot to the left is Truong Phu flagpole on the top of the mountain.

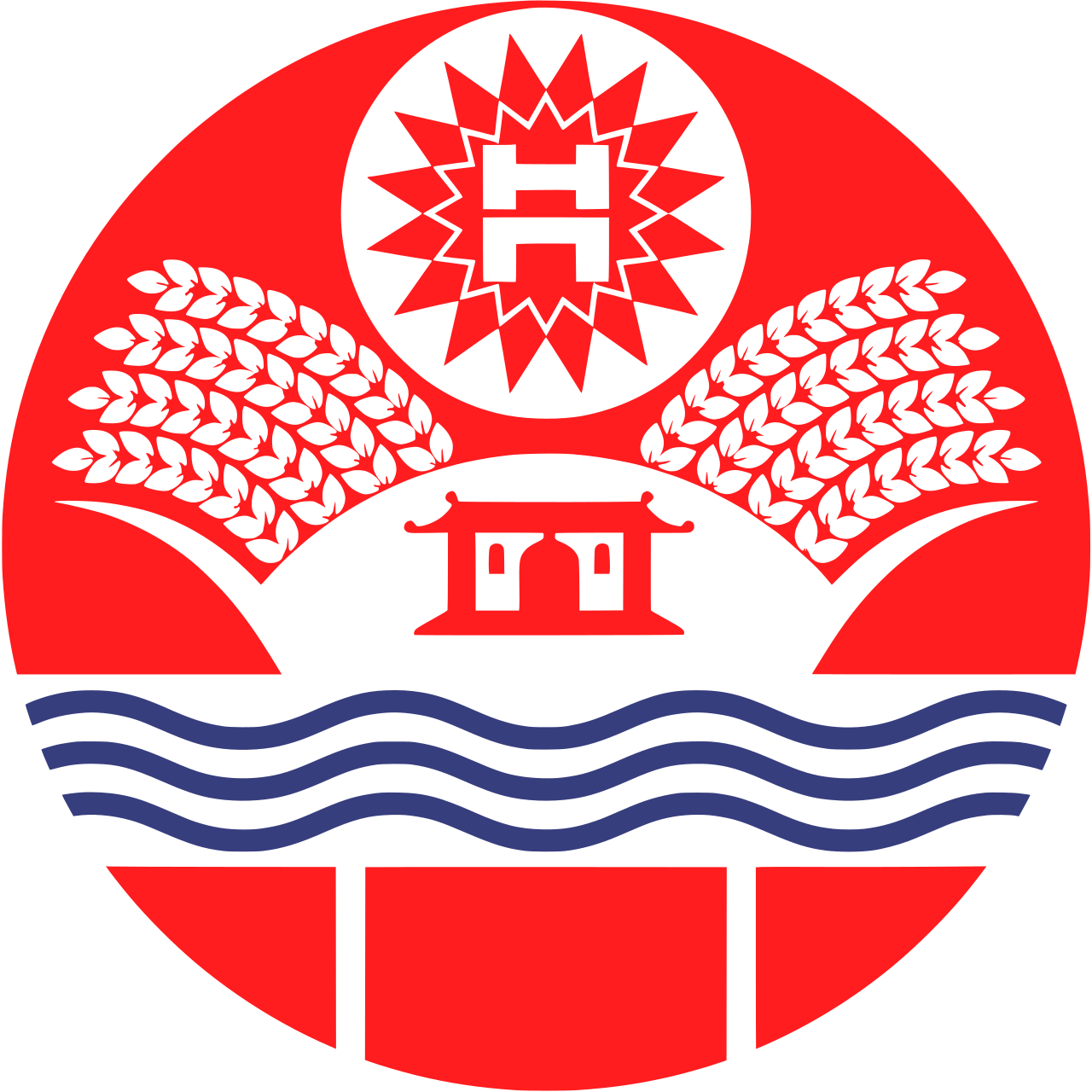
- Seal
- Interactive map of Hưng Nguyên district
- Country: Vietnam
- Region: North Central Coast
- Province: Nghệ An
- Capital: Hưng Nguyên

Area
  - Total: 63 sq mi (162 km^{2})

Population (2003)
  - Total: 120,720
- Time zone: UTC+07:00 (Indochina Time)

Hưng Nguyên is a rural district of Nghệ An province in the North Central Coast region of Vietnam.

== Geography ==
As of 2003 the district had a population of 120,720. The district covers an area of 162 km^{2} (63 sq mi). The district capital lies at Hưng Nguyên.

Hung Nguyen district has 18 commune-level administrative units, including Hung Nguyen town (district capital) and 17 communes.

- Châu Nhân, Hưng Đạo, Hưng Lĩnh, Hưng Lợi, Hưng Mỹ, Hưng Nghĩa, Hưng Phúc, Hưng Tân, Hưng Tây, Hưng Thành, Hưng Thịnh, Hưng Thông, Hưng Trung, Hưng Yên Bắc, Hưng Yên Nam, Long Xá, Xuân Lam.
