= Kyrgyz State Medical Academy =

Medical school

- Кыргыз мамлекеттик медицина академиясы (Kyrgyz); Кыргызская государственная медицинская академия имени И. К. Ахунбаева (Russian)
- Type: Public
- Established: 1 September 1939
- Rector: Turgunbay Sydykov
- Location: Bishkek, Kyrgyzstan
- Website: Kyrgyz State Medical Academy

The Kyrgyz State Medical Academy (KSMA), officially I. K. Akhunbaev Kyrgyz State Medical Academy (Note: (Russian: Кыргызская государственная медицинская академия имени И. К. Ахунбаева, romanized: Kyrgyzskaya gosudarstvennaya meditsinskaya akademiya imeni I. K. Akhunbayeva: Kyrgyz: Кыргыз мамлекеттик медицина академиясы, romanized: Kırgız mamlekettik meditsina akademiyası)) is a public medical school located in Bishkek, Kyrgyzstan.

== History ==
It was opened on 1 September 1939 in the city of Frunze (now Bishkek) in the Kyrgyz SSR, with the recruitment of 200 students. The establishment of the institute was contributed to by the First Moscow Medical Institute, high medical schools of Saint-Petersburg, Almaty, Tashkent and other medical institutions. It is managed by the Ministry of Health of the Kyrgyz Republic.

== Scientific research ==
- Central Research Laboratory
- Scientific Student Society
- Council of Young Scientists
- International Research School of Science & Medical
- Annual international conferences of students and young scientists

== Student life ==
Department of educational work:

- Golden Mean
- Annual Student Initiation
- Student festivals "Star hour" and "Spring - Bishkek"
- KVN team "DNA", "LCD"

For international students:

- Friendship evenings
- Russian language evening
- Study tours

Student Senate:

- Educational sector
- Research Sector
- Housing sector
- Law Enforcement Sector
- Sports and fitness sector
- Cultural work sector
- Information support sector

== Faculties ==
=== Military Faculty ===
The Military Faculty of Kyrgyz State Medical Academy was created in the beginning of the Second World War, specifically in October 1941 when there was a shortage of medical personnel in the medical service. Originally it was the Sanitary Department of Defence, and in 1942 it was renamed to the Department of Military and Health Training, and has since 1944 been known as the Department of Military Medical Training. It is currently part of the Armed Forces of the Kyrgyz Republic and engages in the military training of students of medical, pediatric, dental, sanitary and pharmaceutical departments of the armed forces.

== Notable faculty ==
- Mitalip Mamytov - neurosurgeon and academic
- Kakish Ryskulova - first woman surgeon of Central Asian descent
