= Nghe An – Soviet Nghe Tinh Museum =

- Bảo tàng Nghệ An – Xô Viết Nghệ Tĩnh
- Former name: Bảo tàng Xô Viết Nghệ Tĩnh
- Established: 1960
- Location: 10 Đào Tấn Street, Thành Vinh Ward, Nghệ An Province, Vietnam
- Coordinates: 18°40′14.5″N 105°41′28.3″E
- Type: History museum
- Website: btxvnt.org.vn

The Nghe An – Soviet Nghe Tinh Museum (Vietnamese: Bảo tàng Nghệ An – Xô Viết Nghệ Tĩnh) is a history museum in Thành Vinh Ward, Nghệ An Province, Vietnam. It is dedicated to the Nghe-Tinh Soviets revolutionary movement of 1930–1931 against French colonial rule. The museum serves as a memorial to nearly 2,000 martyrs from Nghệ An and Hà Tĩnh who participated in the uprising.

Established in 1960 as a branch of the Vietnam Museum of Revolution, the museum was built on the site of the former Vinh prison, where thousands of revolutionaries were imprisoned between 1929 and 1931. It officially opened to the public on 12 September 1963. In May 2025, it was merged with the Nghệ An Museum to form the Nghệ An – Xô Viết Nghệ Tĩnh Museum.

== History ==
The museum is located on the grounds of the old Vinh prison, a site used by French colonial authorities to detain revolutionaries during the late 1920s and early 1930s.

On 3 February 1964, coinciding with the 34th anniversary of the founding of the Communist Party of Vietnam, Ho Chi Minh signed a preface for the museum.

The museum has hosted various exhibitions and events, including art installations using 3D mapping to recreate the revolutionary spirit of the Nghe-Tinh Soviets.

In May 2025, the museum was merged with the Nghệ An Museum to create the unified Nghệ An - Xô Viết Nghệ Tĩnh Museum, operating under the provincial Department of Culture, Sports and Tourism.

== Collections ==
The museum houses tens of thousands of artifacts, photographs, and documents related to the Nghe-Tinh Soviets movement. Key collections include drums used during protests, printing presses, weapons, seals, and items used to conceal communist party cadres.

The museum also maintains historical sites associated with the movement, part of a system recognized as a special national relic comprising 9 component sites. There are 139 relics related to the Nghe-Tinh Soviets in Nghệ An Province.
