= Walailak University =

University in Thailand

- มหาวิทยาลัยวลัยลักษณ์
- Type: Autonomous public university
- Established: 1992
- Affiliations: ASAIHL
- President: Dr. Sombat Thamrongthanyawong
- Royal conferrer: Chulabhorn Walailak, Princess Srisavangavadhana on behalf of the King
- Location: Nakhon Si Thammarat, Thailand; 8°38′30″N 99°53′50″E
- Colours: Orange and Purple
- Mascot: Burma padauk
- Website: www.wu.ac.th

Walailak University (WU.) (Thai: มหาวิทยาลัยวลัยลักษณ์) is a public university, founded in 1992, located in Tha Sala District, Nakhon Si Thammarat Province, Thailand. Although state funded, Walailak University is given a high level of autonomy, unusual among Thai public universities.

The university was named after Princess Chulabhorn Walailak.

== Admissions policy ==
First-year undergraduate students gain admission under the quota system for secondary school graduates from the 14 southern provinces or by the national entrance examination administered by the Ministry of Education. Under the quota system secondary school graduates who fulfill the academic criteria set by the university gain admission without having to sit the entrance examination. Other students are admitted on the basis of their marks gained in the national examination.

== Faculties ==
Walailak University is organized into 14 schools and faculties:

- College of Graduate Studies
- School of Agricultural Technology
- School of Allied Health Sciences
- School of Architecture and Design
- School of Dentistry
- School of Education and Learning Innovation
- School of Engineering and Resources
- School of Informatics
- School of Liberal Arts
- School of Management
- School of Medicine
- School of Nursing
- School of Pharmacy
- School of Political Science and Law
- School of Public Health
- School of Sciences

== Colleges ==
Walailak University is organized into 3 colleges :

- Agrarajakumari College of Veterinary Medicine
- Walailak University International College
- Walailak University International College of Dentistry

== International cooperations ==
- World Association for Cooperative Education
- Association of Universities of Asia and the Pacific
- International Association of University Presidents
- Association of Southeast Asian Institutions of Higher Learning

=== Memoranda of understanding ===
- Australia
  - Edith Cowan University
  - Murdoch University
- Austria
  - Salzburg University of Applied Sciences
- People's Republic of China
  - Chinese Academy of Agricultural Sciences
  - Chongqing University
  - Chongqing University of Posts and Telecommunications
  - Harbin Engineering University
  - Kunming Medical University
  - South China Agricultural University
- France
  - Paul Valéry University, Montpellier III
- Germany
  - University of Heidelberg
- Hong Kong, China
  - University of Hong Kong
- Indonesia
  - Gadjah Mada University
  - Sriwijaya University
  - State University of Malang
  - Tadulako University
  - University of North Sumatra
- Italy
  - University of Modena and Reggio Emilia
- Japan
  - Hokkaido University
  - Josai University
  - Kogakuin University
  - Meiji Pharmaceutical University
  - Toho University
  - Tokyo University of Marine Science and Technology
  - International Institute of Applied Informatics
- Malaysia
  - Universiti Malaysia Perlis
  - Universiti Putra Malaysia
  - Universiti Sains Malaysia
  - Universiti Teknologi MARA
  - Universiti Utara Malaysia
  - University of Malaya
- Pakistan
  - King Edward Medical University
- Philippines
  - Central Luzon State University
  - University of the Philippines Los Baños
- South Korea
  - Dongseo University
- (Chinese Taipei) Taiwan
  - National Pingtung University of Science and Technology
- United States of America
  - University of Wisconsin–Madison
- Vietnam
  - Can Tho University of Medicine and Pharmacy
  - Dong Thap University
  - Hai Phong University
  - Hanoi University of Agriculture
  - University of Da Nang
  - Vinh University
- United Kingdom
  - University of Essex

== Mascot ==
The natural symbol of the university is the shady Praduu tree (Pterocarpus indicus Willd.) which grows in abundance in the southern forests.

== University colours: orange and purple ==
Orange is the colour for Thursday, which is the day of the week on which Princess Chulapornwalailak was born.

Purple is the official colour of the Province of Nakhonsithammarat where the university is. The provincial colour is derived from the personal colour of Phra Rattanatachamuni, abbot of Thapoh Temple and famous education reformer and innovator of the southern region of Thailand in the reign of King Rama V, who is locally regarded as the pioneer of modern education in the south.
