= Thành Vinh, Nghệ An =

Thành Vinh Phường Thành Vinh
- Ward
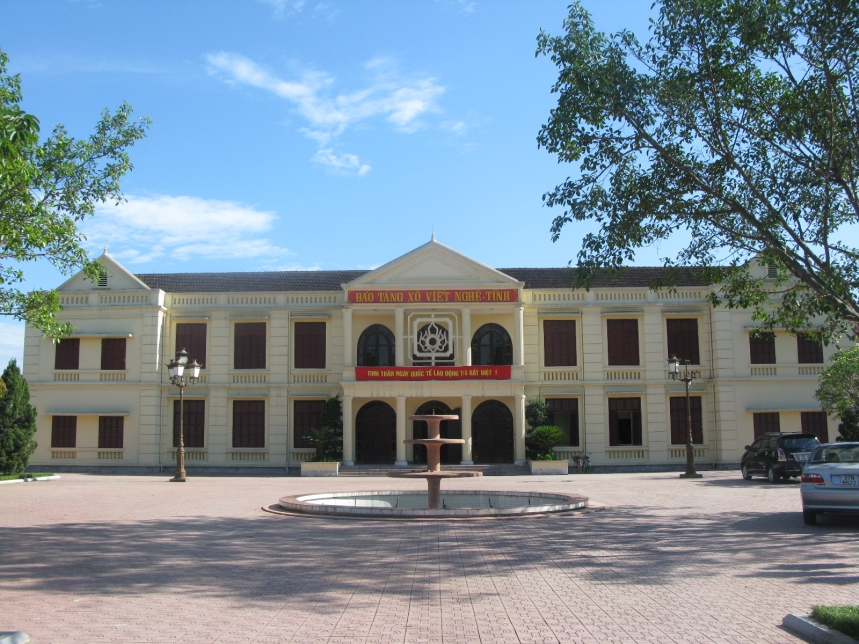
- Nghe An – Soviet Nghe Tinh Museum
- Interactive map of Thành Vinh
- Country: Vietnam
- Regions: North Central Coast
- Province: Nghệ An Province
- Established: June 16, 2025

Area
  - Total: 15.54 km^{2} (6.00 sq mi)

Population (2025)
  - Total: 123,507
  - Density: 7,948/km^{2} (20,580/sq mi)
- Time zone: UTC+07:00 (Indochina Time)

Thành Vinh is a ward (phường) of Nghệ An Province, Vietnam.

== Geography ==
Thành Vinh Ward located in southeastern Nghệ An Province, and adjacent to:

- Vinh Hưng Ward and Vinh Phú Ward to the north
- Hưng Nguyên Commune to the west and southwest
- Trường Vinh Ward to the east and southeast.

== History ==
On June 16, 2025, the Standing Committee of the National Assembly of Vietnam issued Resolution No. 1678/NQ-UBTVQH15 on the arrangement of commune-level administrative units of Nghệ An Province in 2025 (effective from June 16, 2025). Accordingly, the entire land area and population of Cửa Nam, Đông Vĩnh, Hưng Bình, Lê Lợi, Quang Trung, and Hưng Chính Commune were merged to form a new ward named Thành Vinh Ward.
