= Thành Vinh, Thanh Hóa =

Thành Vinh Xã Thành Vinh
- Commune
- Interactive map of Thành Vinh
- Country: Vietnam
- Regions: North Central Coast
- Province: Thanh Hóa Province
- Established: June 16, 2025

Area
  - Total: 115.47 km^{2} (44.58 sq mi)

Population (2025)
  - Total: 27,008
  - Density: 233.90/km^{2} (605.79/sq mi)
- Time zone: UTC+07:00 (Indochina Time)

Thành Vinh is a commune (xã) of Thanh Hóa Province, Vietnam.

== Geography ==
Thành Vinh Commune located in northern Thanh Hóa Province, and adjacent to:

- Ninh Bình Province to the north and east
- Thạch Quảng Commune and Thạch Bình Commune to the west and southwest
- Kim Tân Commune and Vân Du Commune to the southeast.

== History ==
On June 16, 2025, the Standing Committee of the National Assembly of Vietnam issued Resolution No. 1686/NQ-UBTVQH15 on the arrangement of commune-level administrative units of Thanh Hóa Province in 2025 (effective from June 16, 2025). Accordingly, the entire land area and population of Thành Minh, Thành Mỹ, Thành Yên and Thành Vinh Communes were merged to form a new commune named Thành Vinh Commune.
