= David Agmashenebeli University of Georgia =

Georgian university

- Georgian: საქართველოს დავით აღმაშენებლის სახელობის უნივერსიტეტი
- Named after: David IV of Georgia
- Type: Private
- Established: 1992; 34 years ago
- Location: (Georgia (country)) Tbilisi, Georgia; 41°42′37″N 44°46′02″E
- Campus: Urban
- Website: sdasu.edu.ge/en

"David Aghmashenebeli University of Georgia" – "DAUG" (Georgian: საქართველოს დავით აღმაშენებლის სახელობის უნივერსიტეტი – "სდასუ") was founded in 1991. The University offers the Bachelor's (four-year), Master's (two-years) and Doctoral (three-years) programmes according to the ECTS (European System of Credits and Transfers) which is based on the modern methods of teaching and evaluation. The University is a member of the European Business Assembly and has established the place among the best universities in Georgia.

David Aghmashenebeli University of Georgia is a partner with the universities as the United Kingdom, Germany and so on.
