= Vinh Medical University =

Medical school in Vinh, Vietnam

Coordinates: 18.6861°N 105.6985°E

- Đại Học Y khoa Vinh
- Type: Public
- Established: July 13, 2010
- Director: Nguyễn Cảnh Phú
- Faculty: 316
- Administrative staff: 50
- Location: Vinh, Vietnam
- Campus: City downtown, 29.0 hectares
- Website: www.vmu.edu.vn

Vinh Medical University (Vietnamese: Trường Đại học Y khoa Vinh) is a medical university in Vinh, Vietnam. It was founded in 2010. The university was established based on the Nghệ An Medical College, 2003. The university provides healthcare personnel, which includes physicians, nurses and assistant pharmacist, for the North Central Coast region of Vietnam and surrounding areas. The university also trains healthcare personnel for several provinces of Lao People's Democratic Republic, such as Bolikhamsai, Xiangkhouang, Luang Prabang and Houaphanh.

== History ==
At first, the school mostly provided healthcare personnel in diploma level with two years training. The graduation titles included assistant doctor, assistant nurse, medical technician, and primary pharmacist. The first established name was Nghệ An Assistant Doctor School. At this time, Trần Ngọc Đăng, the deputy chief of Nghệ An Health Service was assigned as the first rector of the school. It was under management by the Ministry of Health, and its first location at Hưng Đông commune, Vinh city. There were 10 full-time lecturers appointed by the Ministry of Health. The part-time personnel were the assistant doctors or doctors of Hospital A1 (the name of Nghệ An General Hospital at that time) and the hospital of Army Medical Corps No 4. The student flow was about six hundred at this time, and after graduating, the graduated would be assigned by the Ministry of Health to work for the whole army zone 4.

In 1964, Trần Ngọc Đăng was assigned to work at the Central Committee for South Vietnam. Nguyễn Văn Thanh, the deputy chief of Nghệ An Labor Department was assigned to be the rector, the college came under provincial control and was renamed as Nghệ An Health Worker Training School.

Beginning in 2003 the school was upgraded to college level, and it trains health care professionals in collegial level with a three-year curriculum.
