= Hamedan University of Medical Sciences =

(UMSHA)

Coordinates: 34°47′22.51″N 48°29′5.59″E

Hamadan University of Medical Sciences
- دانشگاه علوم پزشکی و خدمات بهداشتی درمانی استان همدان; Daneshgah-e Olum-e Pezeshki vâ Xâdâmat-e Behdashti Dârmani-ye Ostan-e Hamedan
- Established: 1975
- Affiliations: FUIW
- Chancellor: Dr. gholamreza kalvandi
- Administrative staff: 543
- Students: 7145
- Location: Hamadan, Iran
- Campus: Urban
- Website: umsha.ac.ir

Hamadan University of Medical Sciences (UMSHA) is a medical school in Hamadan, Iran. It was founded in March 1972 as a joint program between Iran and France under the name of the Bu-Ali Sina University. In 1986, the present university was established under the supervision of the Ministry of Health.

UMSHA has 11 schools, 16 teaching hospitals, and 20 research centers. As of 2024, it has 7,145 national and international students in more than 90 undergraduate and graduate programs, including Associate degrees, Bachelor of Sciences, Masters, PhD and Specialties programs. There are 543 faculty members.

Hamadan University of Medical Sciences and Health Services is the main institution responsible for providing, promoting and restoring health at the provincial level. The main mission of this university is to train health care specialist human resources and establish and equip health care centers at various levels, including health homes, urban and rural health care centers, health bases, hospitals, clinics and research centers. In order to achieve health, medical, educational and research goals, this university carries out its activities in the form of 8 educational, research and technology, health, food and medicine, treatment, student and cultural, management and resource development and international affairs, 11 faculties, 17 hospitals, 3 medical clinics, 4 research institutes and 20 research centers.

== University chancellors ==
- Dr. Mohammad Ebrahim Shadmani (1976)
- Dr. Houshang Tarzi (1978)
- Dr. Mahmoud Tehrani (1986)
- Dr. Abbas Moeini (1986)
- Dr. Soleimani Asl (Dec. 22, 1987)
- Dr. Ahmad Ameri (Dec. 5, 1989)
- Dr. Farid Abolhassani Shahreza (July 26, 1994)
- Dr. Seyed Hamid Hashemi (July 7, 1998)
- Dr. Abbas Zamanian (Feb. 27, 2001)
- Dr. Aref Salehi (Nov. 11, 2002)
- Dr. Abdullah Farhadi Nasab (Feb. 21, 2006)
- Dr. Reza Safi Arian (Oct. 11, 2009)
- Dr. Habibollah Mousavi Bahar (May 19, 2013)
- Dr. Rashid Heidari Moghadam (May 2, 2019)
- Dr. Mohammad Mahdi Majzoubi (Oct 10, 2021)
- Dr. Behrouz Karkhanei (Aug 11, 2024)
- Dr. gholamreza kalvandi (June, 2026)

== Faculties ==
Hamadan University of Medical Sciences has 11 faculties as follows:

- Faculty of Medicine
- Faculty of Dentistry
- Faculty of Pharmacy
- Faculty of Health
- Faculty of Rehabilitation
- Faculty of Paramedical Sciences
- Faculty of Nursing and Midwifery
- Faculty of Modern Medical Sciences and Technologies
- Malayer Faculty of Medical Sciences
- Nahavand Faculty of Paramedical
- Paradental Training School

== Research ==
1. Research Institutes: Hamadan University of Medical Sciences has 4 research institutes: Neuroscience and Mental Health, Health Sciences and Technology, Clinical Sciences and Cancer, which have a total of 20 research centers, including cancer research centers, hearing disorders, behavioral disorders and substance abuse, fertility and infertility, occupational health and safety, infectious diseases, molecular medicine, dentistry, urology and nephrology, nutritional health, neurophysiology, modeling of non-communicable diseases, health sciences, maternal and child care, social factors affecting health, medicinal plants and natural products, and chronic disease care.
2. Laboratories: Numerous laboratories in the faculties of medicine, pharmacy, health, dentistry and paramedical science, as well as health centers affiliated with the university, provide educational, research, and treatment services. The Comprehensive Research Laboratory in the field of the Vice-Chancellor's Office for Research and Technology of the University was established in 2016 with the aim of utilizing the capabilities of professors in various fields of basic medical sciences and using modern and advanced laboratory equipment, as well as employing and strengthening experienced experts and providing specialized and sub-specialized services in the field of diagnostic and research tests. It was put into operation in 2017. International cooperation, consulting services, technology services, educational services, and skill development are among the goals of this laboratory. This laboratory is currently set up in a space of 700 square meters and on two floors next to the Faculty of Rehabilitation. Providing laboratory services (specialized and sub-specialized, unique, consulting, and skill development) based on world-class technology and the international level required for researchers and technologists of the university and the province, providing services to researchers at a reasonable cost that is competitive with other existing laboratories, transparency in providing services (time, cost, priority, quality), avoiding any monopoly and autonomy are among the important and fundamental issues in equipping and launching the comprehensive research laboratory of the university.
3. Scientific Cooperation: Signing of memorandums and contracts with Shahid Beheshti, Isfahan, Shiraz, Tabriz, Rafsanjan Universities of Medical Sciences, Bu-Ali Sina University and Hamadan University of Technology for scientific and research cooperation has been among the actions of this university. 4. Innovation and Entrepreneurship: Several measures have been taken in the field of the Vice-Chancellor's Office for Research and Technology of the University and in the Technology Growth Center and the Science and Technology Park to provide financial, logistical and moral support to entrepreneurs and elites, as well as knowledge-based companies.

== International Reputation and Rankings ==
With the efforts of the university's Medical Informatics Management, Hamadan University of Medical Sciences has been present in some of the world's renowned ranking systems over the past years and has taken positions among the world's leading universities as follows:

Times Ranking 2025 & 2026

- World University Ranking: 1001-1200
- Medical and Health: 601-800
- Life Sciences: 601-800
- Engineering: 601-800
- Asian University Ranking: 351-400

Leiden Ranking 2024

- Overall Rank: 1364
- Rank among Iranian Medical Universities: 11

Webometrics 2024

- Overall Rank: 1855

Shanghai Subject Ranking 2023

- Clinical Medicine: 201-300
- Public Health: 301-400

== Medical Libraries and Information Centers ==
The main mission of the University's Medical Information Management is to strengthen the educational, research and health activities of the University by providing, developing and facilitating access to a variety of information resources and specialized databases needed by the academic community and making optimal use of scientific information resources. One of the most important goals of the Medical Information Management is to support the University's efforts to improve its ranking at the national and international levels, by striving to participate in global ranking systems and share knowledge from the research of university researchers in the national and international arenas. The specialized units active in the University's Medical Information Management include: the Central Library and University Document Center, the University's Digital Library, the University's affiliated faculty and hospital libraries and information centers, the Scientometrics and Scientific Monitoring Department, the Knowledge Translation and Transfer Department, the Information Consulting Unit, the Education and Empowerment Unit and the University's Ranking Unit. The Central Library and Documentation Center of Hamadan University of Medical Sciences is located in an area of more than 2,000 square meters and has various sections: technical services (knowledge organization, indexing, information entry into the system and its management, etc.), public services and lending, a repository of information resources, journals and reference resources, a digital library and databases, information consultation, and reading rooms for men and women. Hamadan University of Medical Sciences, with a total of 18 libraries and information centers (8 faculty centers, 9 hospital centers, and a central library and university documentation center), with more than 121,000 copies of Persian and English books, more than 17,000 electronic book titles, and more than 14,000 thesis reports and research projects, access to various specialized databases of medical and health sciences through the university's digital library, has a valuable treasure trove of scientific and specialized information resources to provide information services to professors, students, researchers, physicians, and other health and medical personnel.

== Student Life ==
Hamadan University of Medical Sciences provides various facilities and amenities to its students, as briefly described below, so that they can carry out their educational, research, cultural, sports and other extracurricular activities more easily.

- Dormitories: This university has 12 female, male and married student dormitories, which provide services to university students with various dormitory facilities. It also has a large and central self-service.
- Sports: The university has 5 separate sports halls with the necessary facilities to provide services to students, professors and other university staff, which are available to users throughout the day on weekdays according to the schedule.
- Scientific Associations: The following student scientific associations are active at this university with permission from the Vice President for Student Affairs and Culture: Scientific associations of nursing, medicine, medical emergencies, medical library and information sciences, occupational therapy, artificial intelligence, prosthetics, public health, occupational health, anesthesia, laboratory sciences, nutrition, dentistry, pharmaceutical syndicate, infectious diseases.
- Cultural Centers: The following cultural centers are active at this university: Quran and Family Center, Red Crescent Center, Prayer and Worship Center, Art Center, Health Center, Nahal Charity Center, Abul-Ahrar Committee, Mahdism Center.
- Traditions: The following activities are usually held for students every year at this university: Commemoration of Dormitory Week, Student Elections, Freshmen's Celebration, Student Day Ceremony, Yalda Night Ceremony, White Robe and Graduation Celebrations.

== International collaborations ==
- Networks and Consortiums: The Consortium for International Student Recruitment at Hamadan University of Medical Sciences was established to expand international activities, enhance international student enrollment capacity, strengthen the university’s standing in global higher education, and elevate its academic brand. Through strategic partnerships with licensed and active recruitment agencies, the Consortium provides a structured, goal-oriented, and trackable framework for promoting the university’s educational capacities and managing the intake and admission of foreign applicants. The scope of the Consortium’s activities encompasses promoting the university in target markets, educational marketing, identifying and attracting qualified candidates, providing academic counseling and guidance, receiving and pre-screening credentials, facilitating admission and registration procedures, and supporting students through their arrival and integration into the university. Leveraging the capabilities, expertise, and communication networks of partner agencies in various countries expands the university’s global outreach and enhances the overall efficiency of its international recruitment processes. The member agencies of this Consortium include Hamoon, Khalband, Baloch (Touch Sky), Dr. Razavi, and Shiology. Operating within the framework of university regulations and bilateral agreements, these entities collaborate with Hamadan University of Medical Sciences in academic marketing, institutional promotion, candidate recruitment, admission processing, document completion, registration, and initial onboarding support for international students.
- Agreements: Beyond the framework of the Consortium, Hamadan University of Medical Sciences has formalized strategic agreements and collaborative contracts with reputable academic and educational institutions in Iraq, Afghanistan, Tajikistan, Pakistan, and India. These agreements are designed to facilitate academic mobility, attract qualified international students, and establish sustainable bridges between the university and scientific communities in these key target markets. Furthermore, to enhance the linguistic proficiency of international students and ensure academic excellence, the University has entered into a formal partnership with the Persian Language Center in Qom. Under this agreement, all international students are required to complete rigorous and standardized Persian language courses provided by the center prior to commencing their specialized medical programs. This ensures that students are adequately prepared for the academic and clinical environments of the university. This network of agreements constitutes an integral component of the university’s overarching strategy to advance scientific diplomacy and ensure the long-term sustainability of its international student recruitment processes.
