= Medical Institute, Osh State University =

Public medical institute in Osh, Kyrgyzstan

Osh State University, Osh
- Type: Government sector medical institute
- Established: 2 April 1993
- Location: Osh, Kyrgyzstan
- Campus: Urban
- Language: Russian, Kyrgyz, English
- Website: www.oshstateuniversity.com

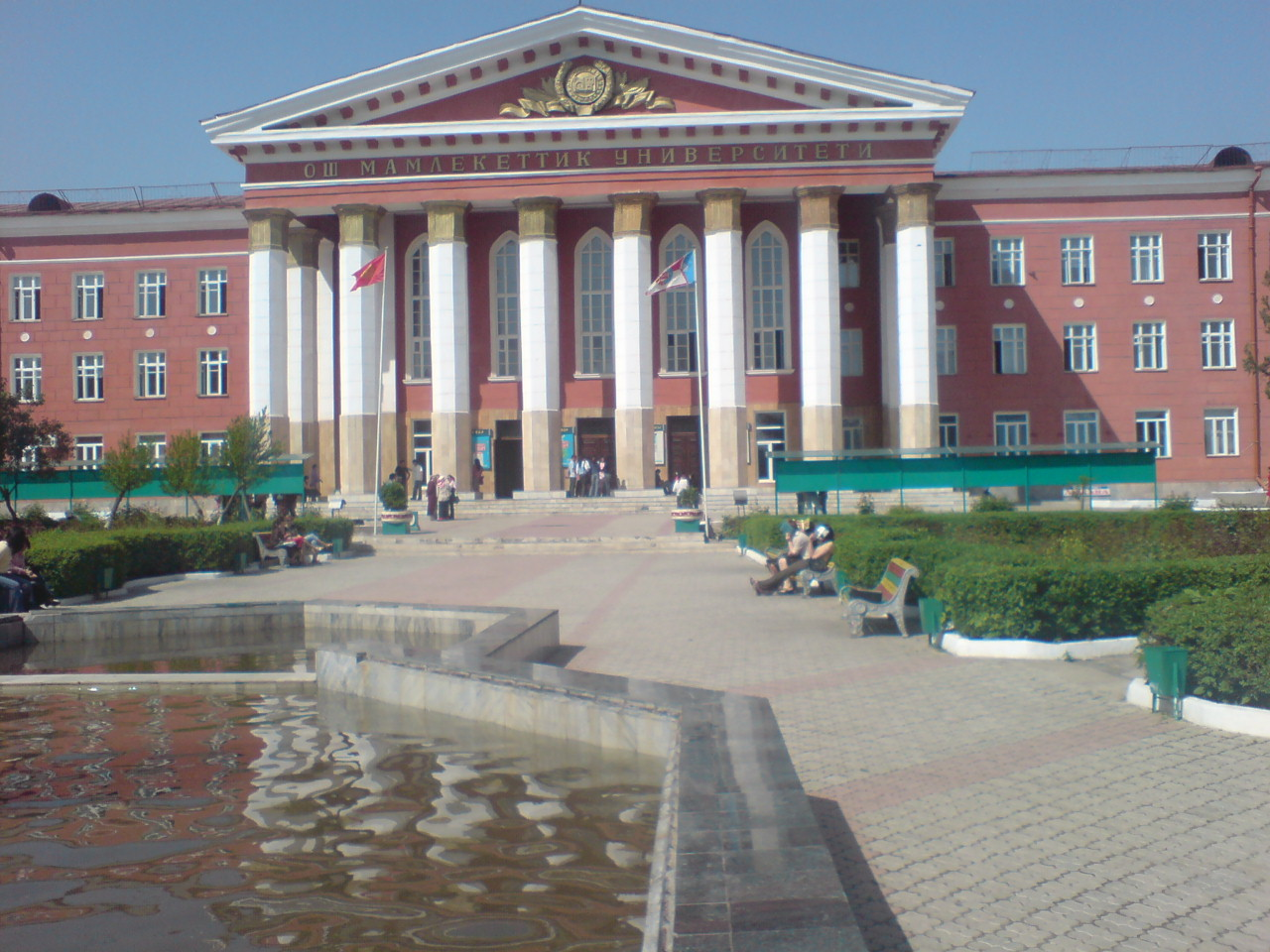
Osh State University

The Medical Faculties, Osh State University is a public medical institute located in Osh, Kyrgyzstan. It opened in 1993 as part of the reorganization of the Osh State Pedagogical Institute into Osh State University.
