= Hai Phong Medical University =

Vietnamese university

Coordinates: 20.8428°N 106.6980°E

Hai Phong University of Medicine and Pharmacy (Hai Phong Medical University)
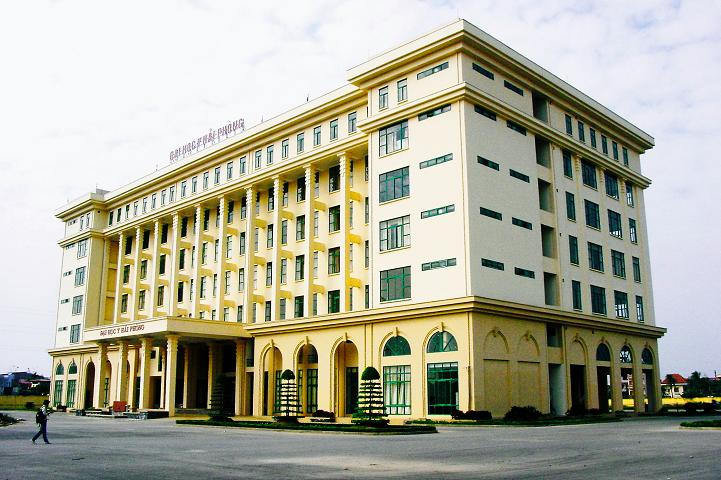
- Type: Public
- Established: 1979
- Rector: NGUYEN Van Khai MD. PHD.
- Administrative staff: 621
- Location: Hai Phong
- Campus: 72A Nguyen Binh Khiem, Ngô Quyền district, Hai Phong, Vietnam
- Website: www.hpmu.edu.vn

Hai Phong University of Medicine and Pharmacy (Vietnamese: Trường Đại học Y Dược Hải Phòng, abbr.: HPMU) is a public university established in September 1979 in Haiphong, Vietnam. The university enrolls 450 full time students (each studying for 6 years) and 200 connected students (4 years) annually. Practice hospitals (with around 5,000 patient beds) are provided for students as medical facilities in Haiphong, Quang Ninh and Hai Duong.

== History ==
In 1979, Ha Noi Medical University established a campus in Haiphong. Later in 1985, this same campus was styled as University Branch of Hai Phong Medical University, which came under the Ha Noi Medical University.

In 2006, the Minister of Health approved the development strategy of Hai Phong Medical University to be the University of Medicine and Pharmacy in Hai Phong, adding new faculties: the faculty of pharmacy, the faculty of odonto-stomatology, the faculty of public health and the faculty of nursing, the faculty of medical technology.

== Faculties ==
The Faculty of Fundamental Science teaches Medical Physics, Chemistry, Biology and Genetics, Mathematics, Informatics, Foreign Physical Education, National Defense Education, Languages and Political Theory.

One of the oldest faculty, the Faculty of Traditional Medicine has existed since 1979, while the Faculty of Public Health and the Faculty of Dentistry were both founded in 2009.

The Faculty of Nursing used to be part of Department of Fundamental Nursing, which in 2005, first admitted students to the nursing undergraduate training program. Several new faculties were established in the next few years, namely: the Faculty of Pharmacy, Medical Technology and Maritime Medicine were founded in 2011, 2012 and 2015 respectively.
