= Asian Medical Institute, Kyrgyzstan =

Medical college in Kant, Kyrgyzstan

Asian International University named after Satkynbai Tentishev (Asian Medical Institute)
- АзМУ "Азиатский международный университет имени Саткынбая Тентишева"
- Motto: Scientia potentia est/Knowledge is power!
- Type: Medical University
- Established: 2004
- Endowment: Ministry of Education and Science of Kyrgyzstan
- Rector: Isaeva Mira Isaevna
- Faculty: 156
- Administrative staff: 45
- Students: 4000
- Undergraduates: 680
- Location: 58, Gagarina Street, Kant, Kyrgyzstan
- Campus: Urban
- Website: "www.aiust.kg"

The Asian International University named after Satkynbai Tentishev (AIU) was established in 2004. Asian International University was established with the official license by the ministry of education and ministry of health of Kyrgyz Republic as Registration number 1–184. Asian International University is enlisted in world directory of medical schools published by WHO. It is located in city Kant, Kyrgyzstan, which is 20 km (12 mi) far from country capital Bishkek and 40 km (25 mi) from Manas International Airport. It's well connected with transportation modes, mainly by road.

== About Asian International University ==
Currently, Asian International University has 1800 students from more than 10 countries, including India, Russia, Nepal, Germany, Pakistan, Kazakhstan and Nigeria. The medium of instruction at the institute is the English language and the length of study for an MD is 6 as well as 5 years. Asian International University has three license in higher professional education

General Medicine 5 years
General Medicine 6 years
Dentistry 5 years

The college is recognized by National Medical Commission of India(NMC), Pakistan Medical Commission(PMC) and WHO. This means that Indian and Pakistani students are eligible to appear in screening test after completion of the medical degree here.

The college has a separate hostel for Indian students and separate hostel of boys and girls. Indian food is served to the students at the hostel mess. The hostels are centrally heated and rooms are available on sharing basis. The overall cost of education is very low at Asian Medical Institute. The good quality education along with low fees makes it a favorable college for foreign students. In addition, students can also avail coaching for FMGE( Foreign Medical Graduate Examination, Screening test conducted by Medical Council of India)

== Institute Campus ==
Institute is currently having 3 well operating campuses based in various localities.

1.Asian Medical Institute, Polyclinic: Situated at 58, Gagarina Street, Kant. It is having 3 Boy's Hostels and 1 Girl's Hostel for Indian Students only. A polyclinic having more than 90 rooms for teaching purposes, including simulation center for anatomy and dental surgeries. 1000 seated Mess at the top floor of hostel.

2.AzMI Campus 2/ Kyrgyzskaya MIS: This campus was owned by institute in year 2016. It has 60 rooms for educational purposes, a 500 seated auditorium, and 60 seated conference hall, while the whole of the second floor has all the administrative offices. Thus is also having library with 9000+ books for medical studies and 20 computers to avail services of online library.

3.AzMI Clinic: This campus was owned by institution in year 2015 having 2 fully equipped lecture halls and 20 rooms for educational purposes. It is situated at Akmatov Street, Alamadin Bazar.

== Accreditation ==
The Asian Medical Institute, Kyrgyzstan is listed in the National Medical Commission, India Avicenna Directory for medicine, faimer and also recognized by the Ministry of Education and Science of the Republic of Kyrgyzstan. It received its recognition from the Ministry of Health, Kyrgyzstan Republic to train medical professionals, mostly for foreign countries. ASMI students and graduates are eligible for M.C.I, PM&DC (NLE now) and N.MC screening tests. The Asian Medical Institute Diploma is a recognized qualification in other countries for the purposes of practicing medicine.
