= Hưng Nguyên =

Hưng Nguyên Xã Hưng Nguyên
- Commune
- Hưng Nguyên commune
- Location within Vietnam
- Coordinates: 18°40′14″N 105°37′55″E
- Country: Vietnam
- Region: North Central Coast
- Province: Nghệ An
- Time zone: UTC+7 (UTC + 7)

Hưng Nguyên is a commune (xã) of Nghệ An Province, Vietnam.
