= Ministry of Health (Kyrgyzstan) =

Government ministry of Kyrgyzstan

Ministry of Health of the Kyrgyz Republic
- Кыргыз Республикасынын Саламаттык Сактоо Министрлили (Kyrgyz); Министерство Здравоохранения Кыргызской Республики (Russian)
- Emblem of Kyrgyzstan

Agency overview
- Jurisdiction: Government of Kyrgyzstan
- Agency executive: Checheybayev Erkin Maratovich, Minister of Health
- Website: med.kg

The Ministry of Health of the Kyrgyz Republic (Kyrgyz: Кыргыз Республикасынын Саламаттык Сактоо Министрлили, romanized: Kırgız Respublikasının Salamattık Saktoo Ministrlili; Russian: Министерство Здравоохранения Кыргызской Республики, romanized: Ministerstvo Zdravookhraneniya Kyrgyzskoy Respubliki) is a government ministry that governs and manages healthcare and the health industry in Kyrgyzstan, including the nation's public health system.

== List of Ministers ==
=== Minister of Health ===
Minister	Term of office	Cabinet
Kosmosbek Cholponbaev	20 April 2019 – 1 April 2020	Abylgaziev
Sabirzhan Abdikarimov	2 April 2020 – October 2020	Abylgaziev Boronov
Alymkadyr Beishenaliev	October 2020 – August 2022 13 September 2023 – 3 February 2025	Jarapov Novikov Maripov Jarapov
Checheybayev Erkin Maratovich	3 February 2025 – 5 February 2025 (acting) 5 February 2025 – present	Kasymaliev

=== First Deputy Minister of Health ===
Minister	Term of office	Cabinet
Aliza Soltonbekova	February 2021 – 28 October 2021	Jarapov
Mederbek Ismailov	6 October 2023 – 14 February 2025	Kasymaliev
Toktomuratov Manas Azimzhanovich	14 February 2025 – present	Kasymaliev

=== Deputy Ministers of Health ===
Minister	Term of office	Cabinet
Baydavletov Kaarmanbek Kochkorbaevich	September 2024 – present	Kasymaliev
Arykbaeva Bubujan Kamchybekovna	June 2022 – present	Kasymaliev
Adnayeva Nurgul Mazhitovna	April 2025 – present	Kasymaliev

== Responsibilities ==
The Ministry of Health of the Kyrgyz Republic is responsible for defining national policy on healthcare projects, implementing national policy on healthcare projects, ensuring access to healthcare and its quality, and coordinating all actors under its purview. The Ministry rarely participates in healthcare programs directly, instead via agencies which represent it.

The Ministry also responsible for the management of scientific research institutes and the Kyrgyz State Medical Academy.
