= Artem Novikov =

Kyrgyzstani politician (born 1987)

- Артём Новиков

First Deputy Chairman of the Cabinet of Ministers of Kyrgyzstan
- In office 5 May 2021 – 20 May 2021
- President: Sadyr Japarov
- Preceded by: Post established
- Succeeded by: Aibek Junushaliev

First Deputy Prime Minister of Kyrgyzstan
- In office 3 February 2021 – 5 May 2021
- President: Sadyr Japarov
- Preceded by: Aida Ismailova
- Succeeded by: Office Abolished (Himself as First Deputy Chairman of the Cabinet of Ministers)

Acting Prime Minister of Kyrgyzstan
- In office 14 November 2020 — 3 February 2021
- President: Talant Mamytov (acting)
- Preceded by: Sadyr Japarov
- Succeeded by: Ulukbek Maripov

Personal details
- Born: 13 January 1987 (age 39) Frunze, Kirghiz SSR, USSR
- Education: Leningrad Mechanical Institute

Artem Eduardovich Novikov (Russian: Артём Эдуардович Новиков; born 13 January 1987) is a Kyrgyzstani politician who served as the First Deputy Chairman of the Cabinet of Ministers from 5 May to 20 May 2021. Prior to this, he served as the First Deputy Prime Minister, as well as the acting Prime Minister of Kyrgyzstan as Sadyr Japarov's official powers in office were suspended pending the results of the January 2021 presidential election.

== Early life and education ==
He was born on 13 January 1987 in the city of Frunze, the capital of the Kirghiz SSR. His father Eduard Viktorovich Novikov (1951-2021), was originally from Kalinin, Tver Oblast and moved to Kirghizia in 1961. A graduate of the Murmansk Higher Marine Engineering School with a degree in Maritime Navigation, he was a long-distance captain and visited many countries, but when his son Artem was born, he changed his job. In subsequent years, he worked in Kyrgyzstan and the CIS countries and was engaged in business. His mother was a gymnastics coach.

As a child, he played basketball and ran track. After high school, he graduated from Bishkek College. From 2004 to 2006, he worked as an accountant at West Ala-Too LLC, and from 2006 to 2007, he also worked as an accountant at the Kemal Ataturk State Oil and Gas Museum. In 2007 he graduated from the Baltic State Technical University with a degree in economics.

== Career ==
After returning to Kyrgyzstan in 2008, he was an intern and translator in the investment policy department of the Ministry of Economic Development and Trade of the Kyrgyz Republic. Then he became the chief specialist of the investment policy department of the Ministry of Economic Development and Trade. From 2011 to 2012, Novikov was an adviser to the then Prime Minister Omurbek Babanov and in 2014-2015 he was an adviser to Prime Minister Djoomart Otorbaev. In May 2017, he was appointed head of the department for financial and economic analysis and development monitoring of the Office of the President of the Kyrgyz Republic. In 2017–2018, Novikov served as the Minister of Economy. In January 2020, he was appointed adviser to Prime Minister Mukhammedkaly Abylgaziev, then adviser to Kubatbek Boronov, who replaced him.

On 14 October, he became the country's First Deputy Prime Minister, serving as part of the interim government formed after the protests that month. After the suspension of the official powers of the Prime Minister Sadyr Japarov on 14 November 2020, in connection with his participation in the early presidential elections in Kyrgyzstan scheduled for January 2021, Novikov became Acting Prime Minister of Kyrgyzstan. Since then, he has been the chairman of the Board of the Russian-Kyrgyz Development Fund. Novikov was reappointed to the position for three years from May 21, 2024.

== Personal life ==
He is an ethnic Russian, the 5th ethnic Russian to be a Prime Minister of Kyrgyzstan. In February 2018, the government allocated 36,000 soms for a three-month course in the Kyrgyz language for Novikov. Novikov himself stated that because Russian is an official state language, he had no reason to study Kyrgyz before. In addition to Russian, he speaks English and German. He managed in learning Kyrgyz as well, and has shown in public to be able to speak Kyrgyz fluently. He is married with two daughters.

Since September 2021, he has been an honorary senior lieutenant in the Kyrgyz Army.

== Awards ==
- (Kyrgyzstan) Order of Dank (18 December 2023)
- (Russia) Certificate of Honor of the President of the Russian Federation (30 November 2024)
- Medal "10 years of the Eurasian Economic Union" (26 December 2024, Supreme Eurasian Economic Council)

== See also ==
- List of leaders of Kyrgyzstan
- President of Kyrgyzstan
- Vice President of Kyrgyzstan
- 2020 Kyrgyz parliamentary election
- 2020 interim government of Kyrgyzstan
- 2020 Kyrgyzstani protests
