= Aida Ismailova =

Kyrgyz politician (born 1976)

First Deputy Prime Minister of Kyrgyzstan
- In office 1 April 2020 – 3 February 2021
- President: Sooronbay Jeenbekov; Sadyr Japarov (acting); Talant Mamytov; Sadyr Japarov
- Prime Minister: Muhammetkaliy Abulgaziyev; Kubatbek Boronov; Sadyr Japarov
- Succeeded by: Artem Novikov

Personal details
- Born: 17 December 1976 (age 49) Frunze, Kirghiz SSR, USSR
- Children: 2
- Education: Bishkek Humanities University

Aida Jekshenbayevna Ismailova (Kyrgyz: Аида Жекшенбаевна (Жекшенбай кызы) Исмаилова, romanized: Aida Jekshenbayeva (Jekshenbay kyzy) Ismailova, Russian: Аида Джекшенбаевна Исмаилова; born 17 December 1976) is a Kyrgyz politician. She served as the First Deputy Prime Minister of Kyrgyzstan from 1 April 2020 to 3 February 2021 and has served as a member of the Supreme Council since 2015. She was awarded with the honorary diploma of the Kyrgyz Republic "Ardak", the honorary medal of distinction "Datka Ayim" of the Kyrgyz Association of Women Police Officers.
