= 2021 Kyrgyz constitutional referendum =

Second of two referendums that remade Kyrgyzstan a presidential republic

A constitutional referendum was held in Kyrgyzstan on 11 April 2021. The new constitution was approved by 85% of voters.

== Background ==
Following the 2020 parliamentary elections, protests started in October 2020 that led to the resignation of president Sooronbay Jeenbekov. In January 2021 a referendum on the form of government was held alongside presidential elections (won by Sadyr Japarov), with voters asked whether they would prefer a presidential system, a parliamentary system, or opposed both. Just over 84% voted in favour of a presidential system.

Work began on drafting a new constitution, which was debated in the Supreme Council in February 2021. The draft new constitution replaces a parliamentary system with a presidential one, with presidents limited to two five years terms instead of a single six-year term. It also reduces the number of seats in the Supreme Council from 120 to 90 and establishes a constitutional court. The changes were described by Associate Professor William Partlett of Melbourne Law School as moving "toward a form of presidentialism that is close to the authoritarian-style 'crown-presidentialism' in the post-Soviet Eurasian space."

In March 2021 members of the Supreme Council passed a bill, scheduling a referendum on the new constitution for 11 April, the same day as local elections.

== Results ==
Choice	Votes	%
For	1,048,660	85.25
Against	181,370	14.75
Total	1,230,030	100.00
Valid votes	1,230,030	93.08
Invalid/blank votes	91,472	6.92
Total votes	1,321,502	100.00
Registered voters/turnout	3,606,201	36.65
Source: CEC

== Aftermath ==
The new constitution was adopted on 11 April 2021. President Japarov signed it on 5 May 2021.
