= 2020 interim government of Kyrgyzstan =

- 25th Cabinet of Kyrgyzstan
- 14 October 2020
- Date formed: 14 October 2020

People and organisations
- Head of state: Sooronbay Jeenbekov; Sadyr Japarov
- Head of government: Sadyr Japarov
- Deputy head of government: Artem Novikov
- Total no. of members: 17
- Member party: Independent; Birdimik; Mekenchil; Chong Kazat; Yiman Nuru

History
- Predecessor: Boronov

The 2020 interim government of Kyrgyzstan is the 25th government of Kyrgyzstan that was formed during the 2020 Kyrgyzstan protests which resulted in opposition groups seizing government buildings during the aftermath of the first 2020 parliamentary election. Sadyr Japarov was nominated as the acting Prime Minister by the deputies on 10 October 2020 who was approved by President Sooronbay Jeenbekov on 14 October which resulted in formation of a cabinet. The following day on 15 October, Jeenbekov stepped down from his post which resulted in Japarov becoming the acting president. This marked the first time in Kyrgyz history that someone served as President and PM at the same time.

On 1 July, the Kyrgyz Foreign Minister Ruslan Kazakbaev visited Azerbaijan. That same day, Kyrgyz Culture Minister Anar Karimov and the Egyptian Ambassador to Azerbaijan Adel Ibrahim Ahmed Ibrahim exchanged views on further cooperation on expanding ties in the cultural field.

== Composition ==
Portfolio	Name	Took office	Left office	Party
President	Sadyr Japarov	15 October 2020	Incumbent	Mekenchil
Prime Minister	Sadyr Japarov	14 October 2020	Incumbent	Mekenchil
First Vice Prime Minister	Artem Novikov	14 October 2020	Incumbent	Independent
Vice Prime Ministers	Maksat Mamytkanov	14 October 2020	Incumbent	Chong kazat
Vice Prime Ministers	Aida Ismailova	1 April 2020	Incumbent	Birdimik
Vice Prime Ministers	Ravshanbek Sabirov	14 October 2020	Incumbent	Mekenchil
Minister of Foreign Affairs	Ruslan Kazakbaev	15 October 2020	Incumbent	Respublika
Minister of the Interior	Ulan Niyazbekov	14 October 2020	Incumbent	Independent
Minister of Justice	Marat Jamankulov	20 September 2018	Incumbent	Independent
Minister of Finance	Mukashev Kyialbek	6 October 2020	Incumbent	Independent
Minister of Economy	Sanjar Mukanbektov	30 May 2019	Incumbent	Independent
Minister of Agriculture, Food Industry and Land Reclamation	Erkinbek Choduev	29 May 2019	Incumbent	Independent
Minister of Transport and Roads	Bakyt Berdaliev	14 October 2020	Incumbent	Independent
Minister of Emergency Situations	Boobek Ajikeev	14 October 2020	Incumbent	Independent
Minister of Education and Science	Almazbek Beyshenaliev	14 October 2020	Incumbent	Independent
Minister of Healthcare	Alymkadyr Beishenaliev	14 October 2020	Incumbent	Mekenchil
Minister of Culture, Information and Tourism	Nurjigit Kadyrbekov	14 October 2020	Incumbent	Yiman Nuru
Minister of Labor and Social Development	Ulukbek Kochkorov	20 April 2018	Incumbent	Birdimik
Chairman of the State Committee for Defense Affairs	Erlis Terdikbayev	30 May 2019	Incumbent	Independent
Chairman of the State Committee for Industry, Energy and Subsoil Use	Jyrgalbek Sagynbaev	29 May 2019	Incumbent	Independent
Chairman of the State Committee for Information Technologies and Communications	Altynbek Ismailov	17 June 2020	Incumbent	Independent
