= Talant Mamytov =

Kyrgyz politician (born 1976)

- Талант Мамытов
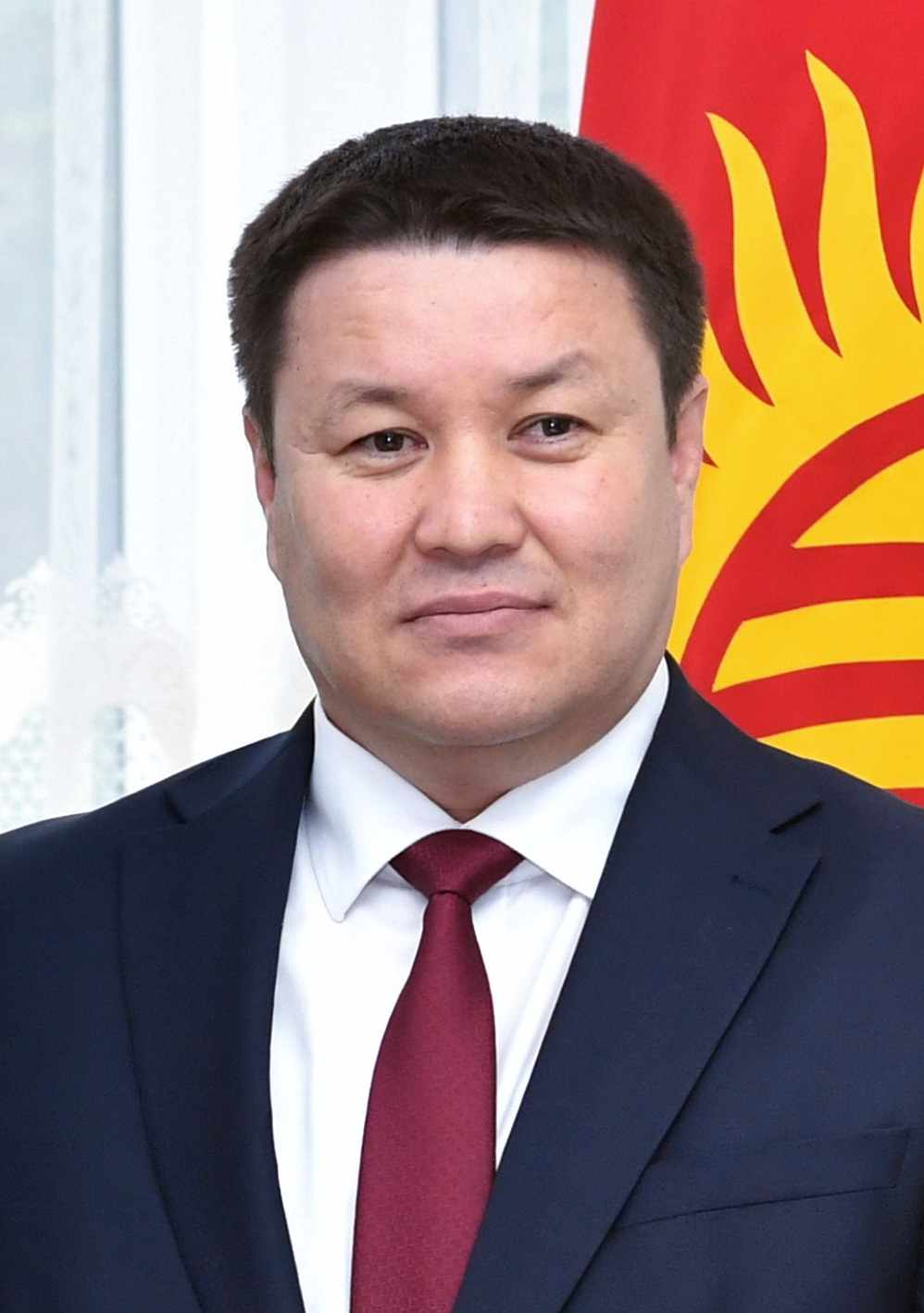
- Mamytov in 2022

Acting President of Kyrgyzstan
- In office 14 November 2020 – 28 January 2021
- Prime Minister: Artem Novikov (acting)
- Preceded by: Sadyr Japarov (acting)
- Succeeded by: Sadyr Japarov

Speaker of the Supreme Council
- In office 4 November 2020 – 5 October 2022
- Preceded by: Kanatbek Isaev
- Succeeded by: Nurlanbek Shakiev

Personal details
- Born: 14 March 1976 (age 50) Mailuu-Suu, Osh Region, Kyrgyz SSR, USSR
- Party: Kyrgyzstan
- Other political affiliations: Ata-Zhurt
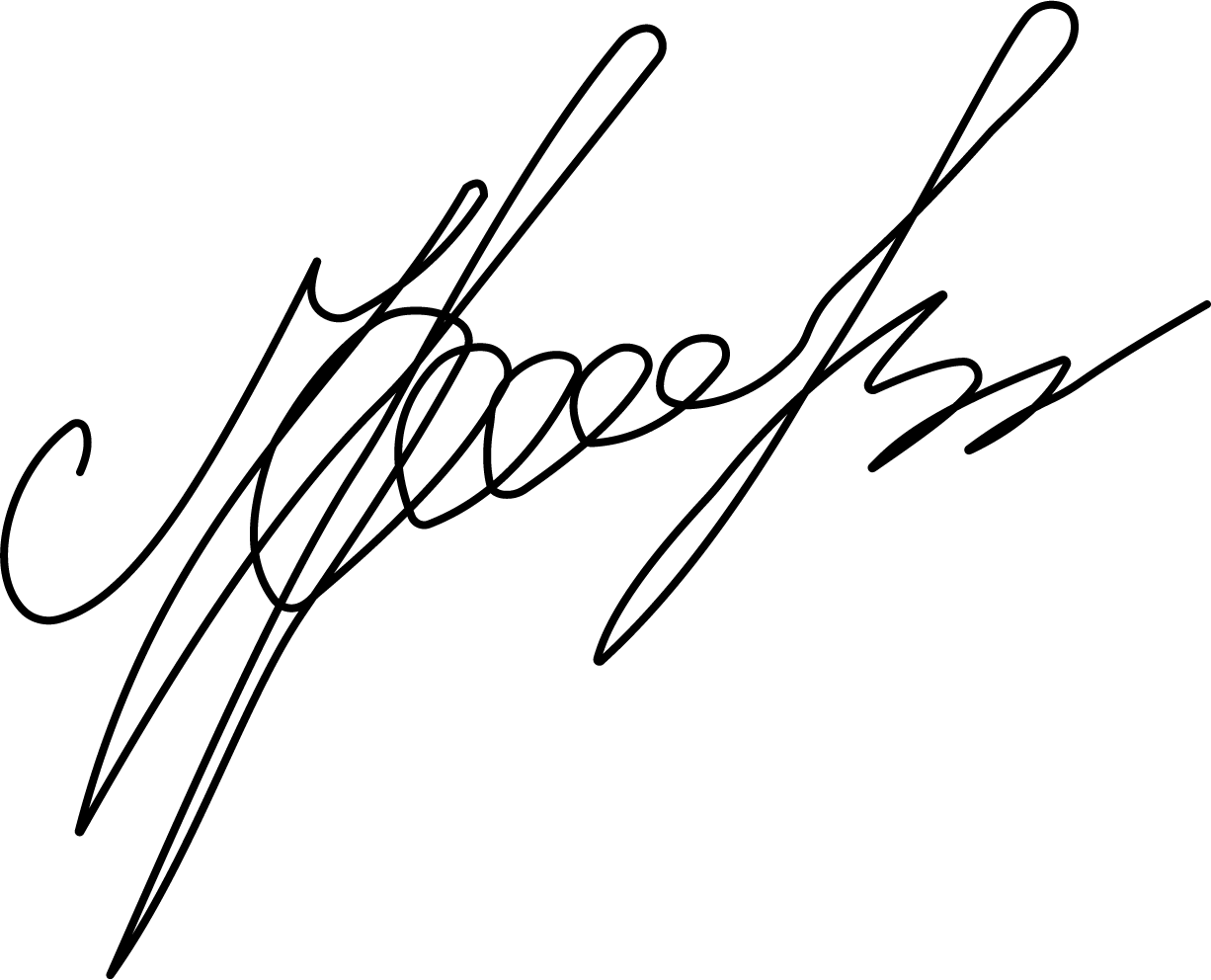
- Signature

Talant Turdumamatovich Mamytov (lKyrgyz: Талант Турдумаматович Мамытов; born 14 March 1976) is a Kyrgyz politician who served as acting President of Kyrgyzstan from 2020 to 2021. He is a member of the Supreme Council of Kyrgyzstan and a deputy from the Republic-Ata Zhurt faction. He was elected speaker of the council on 4 November 2020 after the resignation of interim President Sadyr Japarov. Due to the vacancy of the Presidency, the speaker of the council became head of state of Kyrgyzstan.

== See also ==
- List of speakers of the Supreme Council of Kyrgyzstan
- 2020 Kyrgyz parliamentary election
- 2021 Kyrgyz presidential election
- 2020 interim government of Kyrgyzstan
- 2020 Kyrgyzstani protests
