= State Service for Combatting Economic Crimes =

Anti-corruption agency in Kyrgyzstan

The State Service for Combatting Economic Crimes (Note: Kyrgyz: Экономикалык кылмыштуулукка каршы күрөшүү боюнча мамлекеттик кызматы Russian: Государственная служба по борьбе с экономическими преступлениями) was a government agency tasked with investigating and preventing financial crimes and corruption in Kyrgyzstan from 2012 to 2021.

== History ==
On 15 March 2012, Prime Minister Ömürbek Babanov announced that the Financial Police would be replaced by a new agency, the State Service for Combatting Economic Crimes, as the sole state agency for investigating economic crimes in Kyrgyzstan. In a bid to tackle corruption, applicants to jobs at the new agency were made to take an examination on live Kyrgyz Television.

After years of operation, the government found that the agency was unsuccessful in its goal of preventing crimes and only performed punitive functions. Experts and business representatives also accused the agency of corruption and illegal interference. For these reasons, on 5 March 2021, Prime Minister Ulukbek Maripov signed a decree liquidating the agency.
