= 2021 Kyrgyz government system referendum =

| 10 January 2021 |
- What form of government in the Kyrgyz Republic do you support?

Results
| Choice | Votes | % |
|---|---|---|
| Presidential | 1,133,485 | 84.11% |
| Parliamentary | 151,931 | 11.27% |
| Against both | 62,145 | 4.61% |
| Valid votes | 1,347,561 | 96.65% |
| Invalid or blank votes | 46,657 | 3.35% |
| Total votes | 1,394,218 | 100.00% |
| Registered voters/turnout | 3,563,574 | 39.12% |
- Results by region and independent city

A referendum was held in Kyrgyzstan on 10 January 2021 alongside presidential elections. The referendum asked voters if Kyrgyzstan should adopt a presidential system of government, a parliamentary system, or neither. 84% of voters chose to readopt a presidential system.

== Background ==
On 10 October 2020, Acting President Sadyr Japarov at the extraordinary meeting at the state residence with the MP's called for reform in the Kyrgyz Constitution in which he proposed that there would not be a head of government but instead a system of Kurultai. He also suggested the idea of reducing the numbers of MP's. On 19 October, Japarov announced his possible election bid to serve full-term if the country would amend its Constitution to allow it.

In an interview to Al Jazeera, Japarov explained his vision of a new Constitution, which would be without a parliamentary system. He emphasised the need for the country to return to a single-mandate voting system and make the Kurultai the most important functioning state body where the President and PM would report to and be dismissed in case of poor performance. Japarov claimed that Kyrgyzstan switched to parliamentary form of government too early, due to the mentality of the country's citizens, and mentioned that it would be possible to have parliamentary governance again only in the next 25 to 30 years. On 22 October, the Supreme Council voted to delay a rerun of the parliamentary elections and instead await for new constitutional reform that was promoted by Japarov.

Japarov received criticism and accusations of attempting to seize power and reestablish an authoritarian regime similar to the presidency of Askar Akayev before he was overthrown in 2005. He dismissed these claims during a rally in Osh, where he told residents that "all the proposals on the reforms will be openly discussed with the people. In 10–15 days, we expect to finish defining the proposals and then give them to the Constitutional Council that is to be established.... All interested citizens and representatives of nongovernmental organizations will be allowed to join the Constitutional Council, and its sessions will be aired live on television. The proposals will be offered for public discussions and the final decision on them will be made via a referendum."

On 17 November 2020, the draft of the new Constitution was made public, with the date of the referendum being on 10 January 2021, the same day as the presidential elections would be held.

The content of the referendum was eventually brought down to a question on the nature of the political system, with voters asked to vote for the existent parliamentary system, a change toward a presidential system, or neither.

== Results ==
According to the official results per the country's electoral authorities, 1,394,021 Kyrgyz citizens voted in the referendum, representing a 39.12% turnout from the total of 3,563,574 who were eligible to vote. А switch to a presidential system was the preferred option of 84.1% of voters, while 11.3% chose to retain the current parliamentary system, and 4.6% of voters voted against both options. A total of 197 votes were received from invalid portable boxes.

The presidential system proposal obtained its strongest support in the Issyk-Kul Region, where it received roughly 90% of the total votes, and weakest in the capital region of Bishkek, where it was supported by roughly 57% of voters. Likewise, support for the retention of the parliamentary system was highest in Bishkek (~33.8%) and lowest in Issyk-Kul (5.41%). The Bishkek region also had the highest proportion of voters who voted against both systems — around 7.6% of the total. A second referendum was later held on 11 April to vote on a new draft constitution, officially changing the form of government.

| Choice | Votes | % |
|---|---|---|
| Presidential | 1,133,485 | 84.11 |
| Parliamentary | 151,931 | 11.27 |
| Against both | 62,145 | 4.61 |
| Total | 1,347,561 | 100.00 |
| Valid votes | 1,347,561 | 96.65 |
| Invalid/blank votes | 46,657 | 3.35 |
| Total votes | 1,394,218 | 100.00 |
| Registered voters/turnout | 3,563,574 | 39.12 |
Source: CEC
