= Sapar Isakov =

Kyrgyz politician (born 1977)

- Сапар Исаков
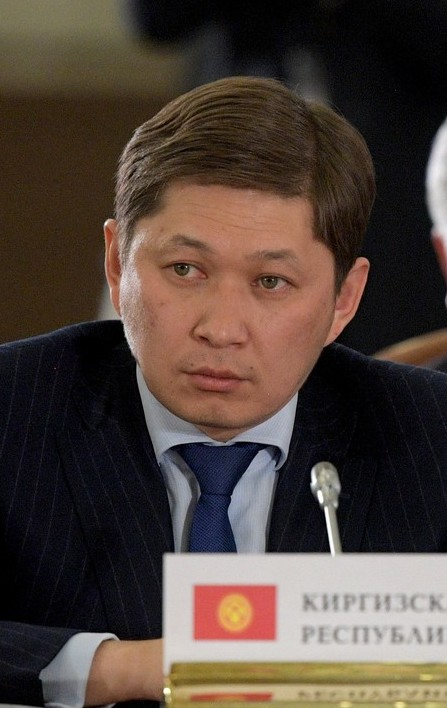
- Isakov in 2017

19th Prime Minister of Kyrgyzstan
- In office 26 August 2017 – 19 April 2018
- President: Almazbek Atambayev; Sooronbay Jeenbekov
- Preceded by: Mukhammedkalyi Abylgaziev (Acting)
- Succeeded by: Mukhammedkalyi Abylgaziev

Head of the Presidential Administration of Kyrgyzstan
- In office March 2017 – August 2017
- President: Almazbek Atambayev

Personal details
- Born: 29 July 1977 (age 48) Frunze, Kirghiz SSR, Soviet Union (now Bishkek, Kyrgyzstan)
- Party: Social Democratic Party

Sapar Jumakadyr uulu Isakov (Note: Kyrgyz: Сапар Жумакадыр уулу Исаков; Russian: Сапар Жумакадырович Исаков, romanized: Sapar Zhumakadyrovich Isakov) (born 29 July 1977) is a Kyrgyz politician who was Prime Minister from 26 August 2017 to 19 April 2018. Previously he was chief of staff for President Almazbek Atambayev.

== Controversies ==
On 19 April 2018, the President of Kyrgyzstan Sooronbai Jeenbekov fired Isakov and the government following a vote of no confidence, which was initiated by three factions in the country's parliament. The vote was launched due to dissatisfaction with the government's performance in 2017, namely, poor administration of the national budget, bad preparation for the heating season, and a lack of state supervision when upgrading Bishkek Thermal Power Station.

Isakov was arrested 5 June 2018 for corruption charges stemming from the Bishkek Thermal Power Station fiasco. The Chinese company TBEA and Kyrgyz politicians including Isakov were accused of criminal corruption and illegal diversion of funds. On 6 December 2019, he was sentenced to 15 years in prison and penalties including property confiscation and the stripping of his diplomatic status.

In June 2020, Isakov was convicted of misusing state funds stemming from the lengthy and expensive renovation of the State History Museum and the hippodrome in Cholpon-Ata, and was sentenced to an additional 12 years in prison, although the sentence was later reduced to 3 additional years. The sentence was upheld in August 2020.

== Notes ==
Political offices
Preceded by Muhammetkaliy Abulgaziyev; Acting	Prime Minister of Kyrgyzstan; Acting; 2017–2018	Succeeded by Muhammetkaliy Abulgaziyev
