= Ravshanbek Sabirov =

Kyrgyzstani politician

Ravshanbek Sabirov is a deputy in the Jogorku Kenesh, the parliament of Kyrgyzstan, and a member of the Ata Meken Socialist Party. Upon his election to the Jogorku Kenesh in 2010, he became the first ethnic Tajik to sit in that body.
