= White House, Bishkek =

Presidential office building in Bishkek, Kyrgyzstan

Coordinates: 42°52′38.25″N 74°36′0.54″E

White House
- Interactive map of the White House area

General information
- Architectural style: Soviet Modernism
- Location: Bishkek, Kyrgyzstan
- Construction started: 1979
- Completed: 1985; 41 years ago

The White House is the presidential office building in Bishkek, Kyrgyzstan. The White House was the site of riots during both the 2005 Tulip Revolution, the 2010 Kyrgyzstani riots, and the 2020 Kyrgyz Revolution. During the 2010 riots, a fire broke out and damaged portions of the building and destroyed the hard copies of many government records; the right wing of the White House was burnt down by protesters in the 2020 revolution.

At present, deputies of the Supreme Council sit in the White House, and the President occupies part of the seventh floor.

== The building ==
Aerial view of building

The building is seven storeys tall and built in Stalinist modern style, with the STO (Gosplan, Duma) building in Moscow as a model. The exterior is covered in marble. In front of the building is a large bed of red flowers representing the country's Soviet ties. The building was commissioned to be the Communist Party's Central Committee headquarters. Construction took eight years and was completed in 1985. It is supposedly in this building where Askar Akayev studied "the situation" during the collapse of communism. There is said to be an underground complex under the Ala-Too Square (formerly the Lenin Square) connected to the White House via an underground series of tunnels. On the front of the building, there is the crest of the nation. Before the end of communism in the country, the location was covered by the crest that was in use during communist times.

== 2005 riots ==
The Tulip Revolution refers to a series of protests that eventually overthrew the President Askar Akayev and his government. On Thursday, 24 March 2005 protests spread to Bishkek, where a large crowd of tens of thousands of people gathered in front of the White House. When security forces and pro-government provocateurs began beating a number of youthful demonstrators in the front ranks, the main crowd behind them closed ranks and a large number of the young swept past the security forces and stormed into the government headquarters. Just when a compromise appeared to have been agreed between the demonstrators and the security services, a mounted charge by government cavalry dispersed the crowd. President Akayev fled with his family by helicopter to Kazakhstan, from where he subsequently flew to Moscow.

== 2010 revolution ==
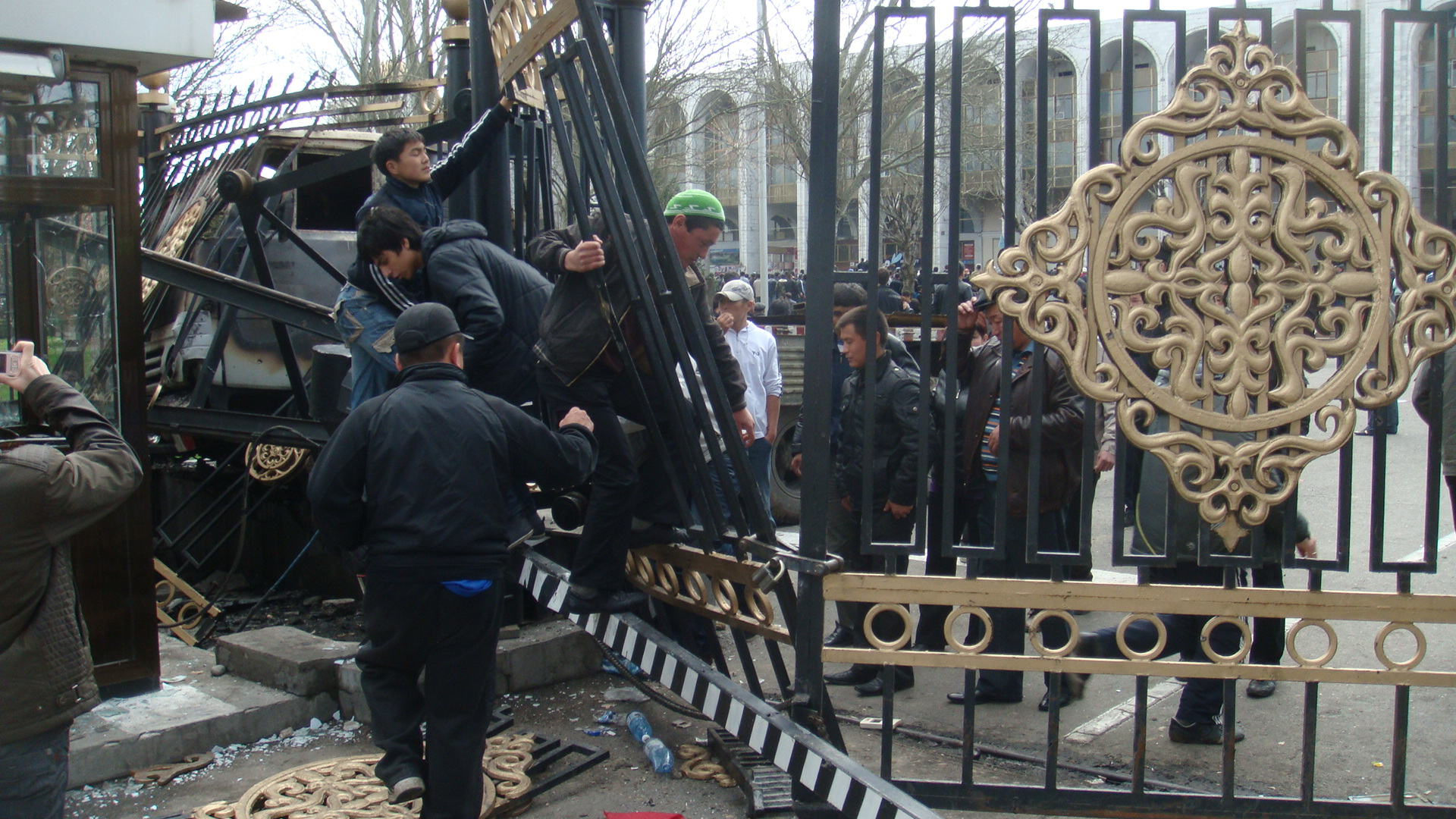
Kyrgyz entering the otherwise-closed White House lawn following protests in Bishkek on 7 April.

In 2010, the building became the centre of the revolution against president Kurmanbek Bakiyev, who used the building as his administration headquarters. On 7 April, protesters in Bishkek filled Ala-Too Square and surrounded the White House. The police at first used non-lethal methods like tear gas, but after two trucks tried to ram down the gate live ammunition was used. Almost 90 protesters were killed in the ensuing engagement. After the protests subsided, the building was taken over by the provisional government. In the aftermath of the riots, it was determined that a fire that occurred in the building had destroyed records that were housed there. This destruction complicated the prosecution of former president Kurmanbek Bakiyev, though in 2013 he was sentenced to 24 years in absentia.
