= Sadyr Japarov =

President of Kyrgyzstan since 2021

His Excellency Sadyr Japarov
- Садыр Жапаров
- Japarov in 2024

6th President of Kyrgyzstan
- Incumbent
- Assumed office 28 January 2021
- Prime Minister: Artem Novikov (acting); Ulukbek Maripov; Akylbek Japarov; Adylbek Kasymaliev
- Preceded by: Talant Mamytov (acting)
- Acting; 15 October 2020 – 14 November 2020
- Prime Minister: Himself
- Preceded by: Sooronbay Jeenbekov
- Succeeded by: Talant Mamytov (acting)

22nd Prime Minister of Kyrgyzstan
- In office 6 October 2020 – 14 November 2020 (Note: Acting: 6 – 10 October 2020)
- President: Sooronbay Jeenbekov; Himself (acting); Talant Mamytov (acting)
- Deputy: Artem Novikov
- Preceded by: Kubatbek Boronov
- Succeeded by: Artem Novikov (acting)

Personal details
- Born: 6 December 1968 (age 57) Keng-Suu, Kyrgyz SSR, Soviet Union (now Kyrgyzstan)
- Party: Mekenchil
- Other political affiliations: Ata-Zhurt
- Spouse: Aigul Asanbaeva (m. 1991)
- Education: Kyrgyz-Russian Slavic University

Military service
- Branch/service: Soviet Army
- Years of service: 1987–1989
- Rank: Junior Sergeant

Sadyr Nurgojo uulu Japarov (Note: /səˈdɪər dʒəˈpɑːrəv/; Kyrgyz: Садыр Нургожо уулу Жапаров, pronounced [sɑˈdɯɾ nʊɾʁoˈʑo uːˈɫʊ ʑɑˈpɑɾof]) (born 6 December 1968) is a Kyrgyz politician, lobbyist, and legislator who has been serving as the sixth president of Kyrgyzstan since 28 January 2021. He previously served as the 22nd prime minister in the 2020 interim government, following the resignation of President Sooronbay Jeenbekov. Japarov also became acting president of Kyrgyzstan after Jeenbekov's resignation, but resigned on 14 November 2020 to run in the 2021 presidential election, in which he was elected to succeed the acting president, Talant Mamytov. Between 14 November 2020 and 28 January 2021, he was regarded to be the de facto leader of the country.

Japarov began his political career as a deputy in 2005 after being elected to the Supreme Council and from 2007 served in the presidential administration under Kurmanbek Bakiyev before Bakiyev's overthrow in the 2010 Kyrgyz Revolution. Japarov then resumed office as a deputy and held popular rallies to overthrow the Kyrgyz government, supporting attempts to seize the Bishkek White House and allegedly to kidnap an akim, which made it necessary for him to flee Kyrgyzstan in 2013 to avoid prosecution. Japarov returned to Kyrgyzstan in 2017, where he was arrested and sentenced to an 11 year prison term due to his prior illegal political activities. His prison sentence was cut short when he was freed by his supporters during the 2020 Kyrgyz Revolution, leading for his rise to power in Kyrgyzstan.

Japarov's presidency is viewed as authoritarian, as he consolidated power and stifled dissent. Before Japarov took charge, Kyrgyzstan was known for a political climate more open than those of other post-Soviet states of Central Asia. He reintroduced a presidential system via constitutional and government system referendums that increased his executive powers and reduced the parliament's influence, as well as creating the People's Kurultai which resulted in Kyrgyzstan facing democratic backsliding. Several opposition politicians and activists were detained, independent media outlets have been shut down and journalists arrested, and new laws aimed at suppressing independent media were introduced. Under his presidency, the Kyrgyz government has embarked on a program of vastly increased public spending, much of which is going to companies owned by Japarov through complex networks of proxies.

== Early life and education ==
Japarov was born in Keng-Suu, a village in the Tüp District in what was then the Kirghiz SSR within the Soviet Union, in the family of Nurgozho and Kadic Japarov. After finishing his middle school education in 1986, he joined the Kyrgyz National Academy of Physical Culture and Sport. In 1987, Japarov was drafted into the Soviet Army, where he served for two years in Novosibirsk as a commander in a telecommunications division. After returning in 1989 with the rank of Junior Sergeant, Japarov continued his education in the academy until 1991. In 2006, Japarov graduated from the Kyrgyz-Russian Slavic University in Bishkek with a degree in law.

== Early political career ==
Japarov started his political career after the 2005 Tulip Revolution. In March 2005, he was elected as member of the Supreme Council from the Tüp electoral district where he headed the Kelechek parliamentary faction. He was a supporter of President Kurmanbek Bakiyev. In 2006, Japarov was a member of the State Awards Commission. In 2007, he was Deputy Chairman of the Amnesty Commission.

In the 2007 parliamentary elections, he participated in the lists of the pro-presidential party Ak Jol, which won the majority of seats in parliament but went on to work as an adviser to the president. From 2008 to 2010, Japarov worked as an authorized representative of the National Agency for the Prevention of Corruption.

=== Raider capture of Issyk-Kul Bank ===
Japarov, during his tenure as a supreme commissioner in the National Agency for the Prevention of Corruption, was repeatedly accused of raiding the Issyk-Kul Bank in order to help the business empire of Maxim Bakiyev, the son of then-president Kurmanbek Bakiyev. Japarov's sister, Raikul Japarova, in alliance with Lithuanian businessman Mikhail Nadel, a friend of Maksim Bakiyev, forcibly seized the Issyk-Kul Bank. Later, Raikul Japarova, becoming the nominal chairman of the Issyk-Kul bank, carried out all the instructions of Nadel to carry out all the activities. NBKR documents stated that through this bank, Sadyr Japarov and his sister laundered $5 billion for Maxim Bakiyev. Among which, according to the statement of the previous head of the State Committee for National Security, Abdil Segizbayev, there was money from drug trafficking and arms trafficking stating, "He made a turnover of this money and pulled it out clean and took his interest.".

In 2020, Erkinbek Asrandiev, ex-deputy prime minister and former auditor of the bank in 2013, also confirmed the raiding of the Issyk-Kul bank and its use for the purpose of laundering the funds of the ruling regime by Japarov and his sister Raikul. He stated it as a main reason for rejecting Japarov's offer to work in his cabinet of ministers in 2020. Another remark concerns the fact that, being the High Commissioner for Corruption, Japarov did not take any measures against the corruption schemes of the clan of Kurmanbek Bakiyev, his brother Janish Bakiyev and son Maxim Bakiyev, but rather maintained warm family relations with them.

=== Second Kyrgyz Revolution and the 2010 election ===
In 2010, President Bakiyev was overthrown in the Kyrgyz Revolution of 2010. As a result of interethnic clashes that took place soon in Osh and Jalal-Abad, Japarov and his associates took an active part, which according to their own statements, they tried to prevent clashes. However, they were accused by opponents in actively supporting the Kyrgyz nationalists and provoking the conflict.

Following the revolution, Japarov was re-elected as a member of Supreme Council on the party list of Ata-Zhurt led by Kamchybek Tashiev, which won the majority of seats in the 2010 parliamentary election. From there, he became the chairman of the Committee on Judicial and Legal issues.

In his book 10 Years in Politics, Japarov later admitted that party received 3 million dollars for the 2010 parliamentary election from some "Kazakh friends." According to the electoral legislation, receiving assistance from abroad is prohibited by law. In the book, Sadyr Japarov accused Akhmatbek Keldibekov of embezzling funds from "Kazakh friends" in the 2010 elections. Keldibekov was also a close associate of fugitive President Kurmanbek Bakiyev and was the head of the tax service of the Kyrgyz Republic.

=== Attempted White House seizure and kidnapping of Issyk-Kul Region akim ===
During one of the rallies for the nationalization of the Kumtor Gold Mine in the fall of 2012, the protesters attempted to take over the White House in Bishkek.

While Japarov, in a bulletproof vest and with weapons, entered the parliament, his allies, deputies, Mamytov and Tashiev, led people to storm the parliamentary fence. They had a large arsenal with them: automatic pistols, Makarov pistols, hunting carbines with hundreds of rounds, metal crowbars, stones and knives. Tashiev and Japarov were both charged under Article 295 of the Criminal Code of the Kyrgyz Republic "Forcible seizure of power or forcible retention of power." In March 2013, the Pervomaisky District Court of Bishkek found them guilty and sentenced them to one year and six months in prison. But in June 2013, the Bishkek City Court acquitted the politicians and released them in the courtroom. After one of these rallies in May 2013, residents of Issyk-Kul villages seized an electrical substation and de-energized a gold mining enterprise. At the same time, unknown people extorted $3 million from the manager of the Canadian Centerra in exchange for stopping the rallies.

On 27 June 2013, during the protests against Kumtor in Karakol, the protesters tried to kidnap the akim of the region Emilbek Kaptagaev and take him hostage. The Kyrgyz authorities accused Japarov and Kubanychbek Kadyrov of organizing the plan. The protest leaders were detained, but Japarov, who denied his involvement, fled Kyrgyzstan and lived in Cyprus for some time.

=== 2017 arrest and imprisonment ===
In 2017, Japarov attempted to return to Kyrgyzstan. On 25 March 2017, he was detained at the Kyrgyz-Kazakh border. In the case of allegedly attempting to kidnap Emilbek Kaptagaev, he was sentenced to 11 years and 6 months in prison. While in prison, Japarov founded the political party Mekenchil with Kamchybek Tashiyev. Between 2018 and 2019, the party and its supporters grew and organized protests against Japarov's imprisonment.

== Interim leadership of Kyrgyzstan ==
On 5 October 2020, protests and demonstrations against the results of the parliamentary elections began throughout Kyrgyzstan.

After the release of Japarov from a seized government building on 6 October, he was taken to Ala-Too Square in Bishkek where he sought appointment to become prime minister. Members of parliament staying at the Dostuk Hotel approved his appointment that night, but the opposition's nominee, Tilek Toktogaziev, declared himself to be the legitimate head of government. Toktogaziev asserted the election to be illegal, claiming that members were pressured by Japarov's supporters who had gathered near the hotel. Opponents of Japarov also highlighted the absence of a quorum and a violation of parliamentary procedure.

On 13 October, then-President Sooronbay Jeenbekov rejected Japarov's appointment as prime minister due to proxy voting occurring. Jeenbekov requested for the parliament to reconvene and vote again for the nomination; this happened the following day, with Japarov again winning parliamentary nomination. Japarov successfully was approved as prime minister by Jeenbekov, but he was initially unsuccessful in persuading the president to step down until a new general election could be held. The following day, on 15 October, Jeenbekov resigned from the presidency, leading Japarov to declare himself as acting president. Despite the Kyrgyzstan Constitution stating that the speaker of the Supreme Council should succeed to the office, Kanatbek Isaev refused to assume office, resulting in Japarov becoming the acting president. He was confirmed as president of Kyrgyzstan by parliament on 16 October 2020.

=== Constitutional reforms ===
Japarov initiated a series of constitutional reforms which were criticized by journalists and human rights activists for establishing an absolute presidential system in Kyrgyzstan, as it allowed for a president to serve two consecutive terms and massively lowered the powers of parliament which earned nickname for a new draft for the Constitution of Kyrgyzstan as "Khan-situation". In addition, the formation of People's Kurultai was compared to Turkmenistan's Khalk Maslakhaty (People's Council) with Article 7 of the new Kyrgyz constitution stating that "the highest deliberative, consultative and coordinating body of democracy is the People's Kurultai."

The changes were described by Associate Professor William Partlet of Melbourne Law School as moving "toward a form of presidentialism that is close to the authoritarian-style 'crown-presidentialism' in the post-Soviet Eurasian space." The amendments are opposed by both Kyrgyz experts and human rights activists, as well as international organizations, including the Venice Commission of the Council of Europe and the OSCE Office for Democratic Institutions and Human Rights. Kyrgyz deputy Omurbek Tekebayev and former prime minister Felix Kulov also compared the strengthening of the presidential powers and the introduction of the institution of the People's Kurultai with the usurpation of power in Turkmenistan. Former deputy Sadiq Sher-Niyaz said that the draft constitution is an attempt to seize power and lead to totalitarianism, he called on lawmakers to reject the new version of the Basic Law. After the adoption of the new Constitution following the 2021 constitutional referendum and the subsequent 2021 government system referendum, Kyrgyzstan dropped 50 positions in the freedom of speech rating.

== Support of PMC Wagner group ==
During the 2020 presidential elections, Sadyr Japarov, according to an investigation by Kloop (the OCCRP's Kyrgyz partner), was supported by Russian political strategists associated with Yevgeny Prigozhin, the founder of the private military company Wagner. Among them were Alexander Malkevich, Alexander Seravin, and Pyotr Bychkov, all three of whom are under US sanctions.

In the photographs published by Kloop, the political strategists are pictured with Sadyr Japarov and the head of the Central Election Commission of Kyrgyzstan, Nurzhan Shaildabekova. Bychkov and Malkevich are the founders of the National Values Protection Foundation, which is associated with Prigozhin's projects in Africa, Syria, and other countries. Seravin, previously the vice-governor of the Pskov region, worked on Vladimir Putin's re-election and the reset of his presidential terms. According to a number of investigations, these individuals also participated in campaigns to interfere in the internal affairs of other countries, including elections in the United States, and in Kyrgyzstan, Malkevich openly called for the suppression of civil society in Kyrgyzstan.

After the publication of the investigation, the Kyrgyz authorities blocked the Kloop website in the country, and journalist Leyla Saralaeva, who published the material, was forced to leave Kyrgyzstan due to threats and pressure. In 2024, the emergence of a private military company, the Black Legion, was noted in Kyrgyzstan.

== President of Kyrgyzstan (2021–present) ==
=== Domestic policy ===
==== Kumtor Gold Mine ====
Since 2012, Japarov has advocated the nationalization of the Kumtor gold mine located in his native Issyk-Kul Region, and accused the management company, Centerra Gold, of environmental violations and corruption. His stance has earned him popularity among his fellow natives of the region.

On 14 May 2021, he signed into a bill allowing for temporary government control over the mine, eight days after it was approved by parliament. In response, Centerra Gold launched arbitration against Kyrgyzstan over the mine.

Under a settlement reached in April 2022, full ownership of the mine was transferred to Kyrgyzstan.

After the enterprise was nationalized and taken away from the Canadian company that had been developing it for almost 30 years, the Kumtor gold mining enterprise became unprofitable. Judging by the quarterly and annual reports published on the company's website, Kumtor became unprofitable in the first quarter of 2023.

==== Adoption of a law on foreign-funded NGOs ====
In 2024, Kyrgyzstan also adopted a new law requiring foreign-funded NGOs engaged in political activity to register with the Ministry of Justice and submit to greater government oversight of their activities. According to Human Rights Watch, this law is similar to a bill introduced in 2013 before finally being withdrawn. Both versions of the law present similarities to Russia's own undesirable organizations law.

Prior to the adoption of this law, Russian Defense Minister Sergei Shoigu made statements about the potential danger posed by foreign NGOs in Central Asia for Russian interests.

Sadyr Japarov became the main driver in promoting this law and publicly supported it.

The law gives prosecutors the power to extrajudicially declare foreign and international organizations "undesirable" in Kyrgyzstan and shut them down. Organizations are subject to heavy fines and lengthy prison sentences if they fail to dissolve when given notice to do so.

==== Restrictions on LGBT-related information ====
On 14 August 2023 Japarov signed amendments to the law on protecting children from harmful information. The amendments classify information about "non-traditional sexual relationships" as harmful to children and ban its dissemination. It was the third attempt to pass such a law in Kyrgyzstan, after bills in 2014 and 2015 failed. LGBT rights organisations said the measure closely copied Russia's legislation against so-called "LGBT propaganda".

==== Other ====
Japarov's first five executive orders were related to spiritual development, a new personnel policy, business protection, migration, and mining. On 11 February, Japarov signed a decree on the celebration of the 120th anniversary of the birth of political figure Zhusup Abdrakhmanov.

=== Foreign policy ===
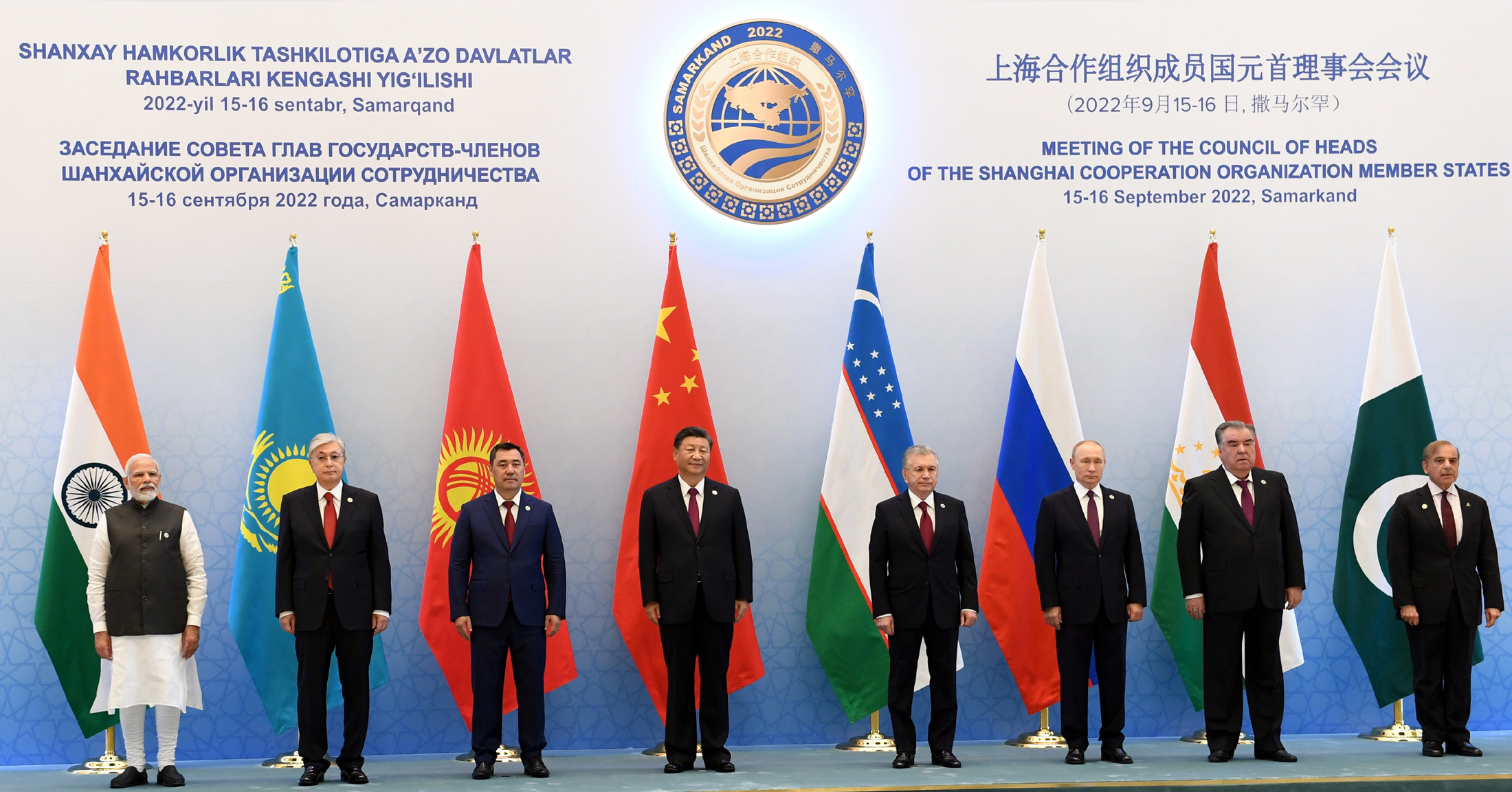
Japarov with Chinese president Xi Jinping, Kazakh President Kassym-Jomart Tokayev and other leaders at the Shanghai Cooperation Organization summit on 16 September 2022

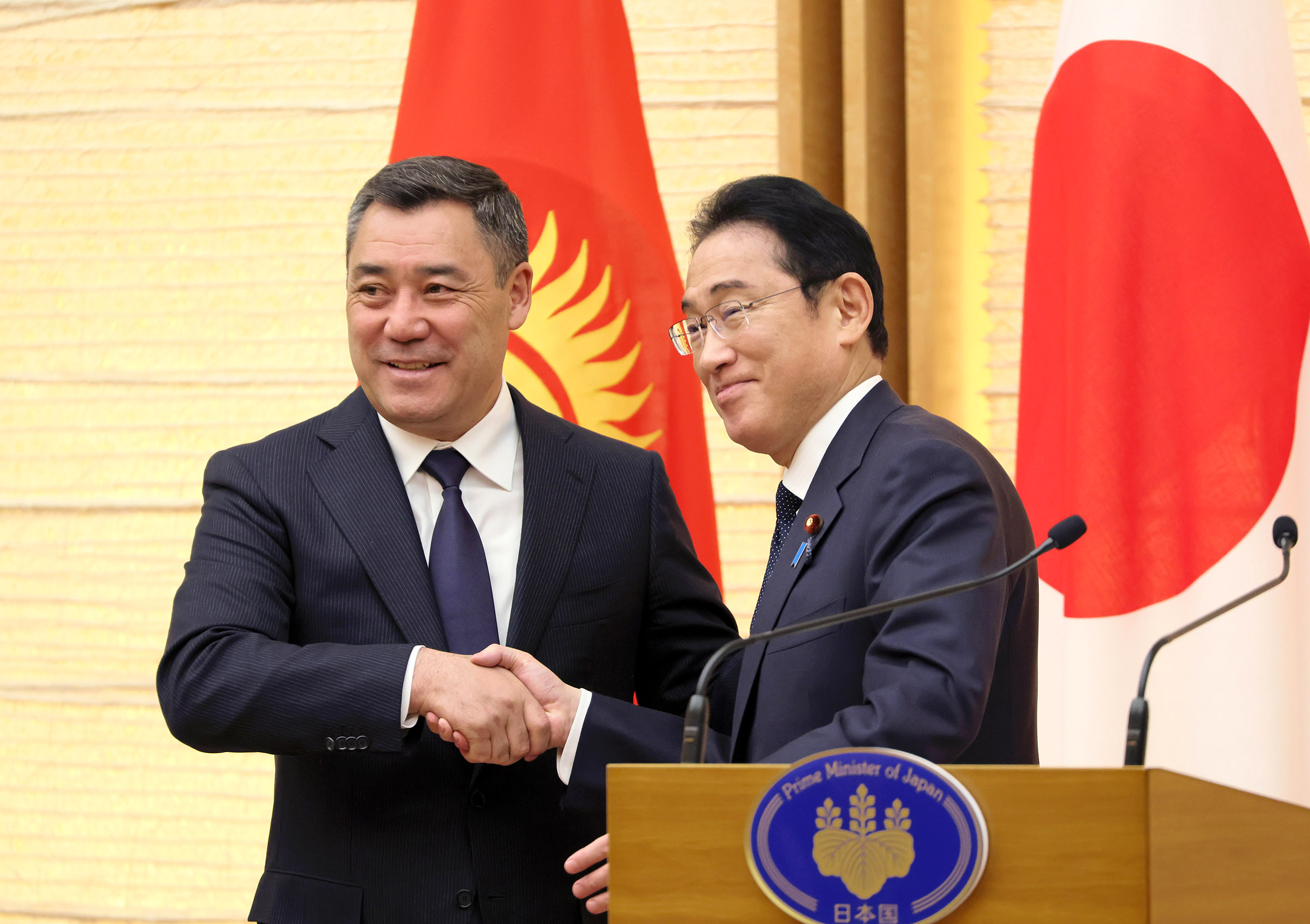
Japarov with Japanese prime minister Fumio Kishida, 20 November 2023

Japarov has emphasized his administration will have a "multipronged" foreign policy, with Russia, Kazakhstan, and Uzbekistan being major partners under his leadership.

Japarov has favorable views of China. He described the China-Kyrgyzstan relations as the closest it has ever been. He has stated that China and Kyrgyzstan are dedicated to opposing East Turkestan terrorist forces, including through the repatriation of suspects.

Japarov has suggested Kyrgyzstan pay off debt to China with mineral concessions.

On 2–3 March 2021, Japarov visited Astana, where he held consultations with Kazakhstan President Kassym-Jomart Tokayev and former president Nursultan Nazarbayev. Japarov secured a protocol aimed to ensure energy security of Kyrgyzstan by preventing Toktogul Reservoir from running out of water to a critical level. During the visit, Japarov said that "there are no political contradictions between our countries" and that "We have many common interests". He visited Tashkent a week later, where he and Uzbek President Shavkat Mirziyoev agreed to solve all border issues in three months.

In June 2021, Sadyr Japarov and his Turkmen counterpart Gurbanguly Berdymukhamedov met to discuss the possibility of Turkmenistan supplying Kyrgyzstan with natural gas and electricity in the autumn and winter. At the time, Kyrgyzstan authorities had plans to convert the Bishkek coal-burning power plant to gas. On 17 June, Ulukbek Maripov, head of the Kyrgyz cabinet, stated his view that gas was too costly.

==== Russia ====
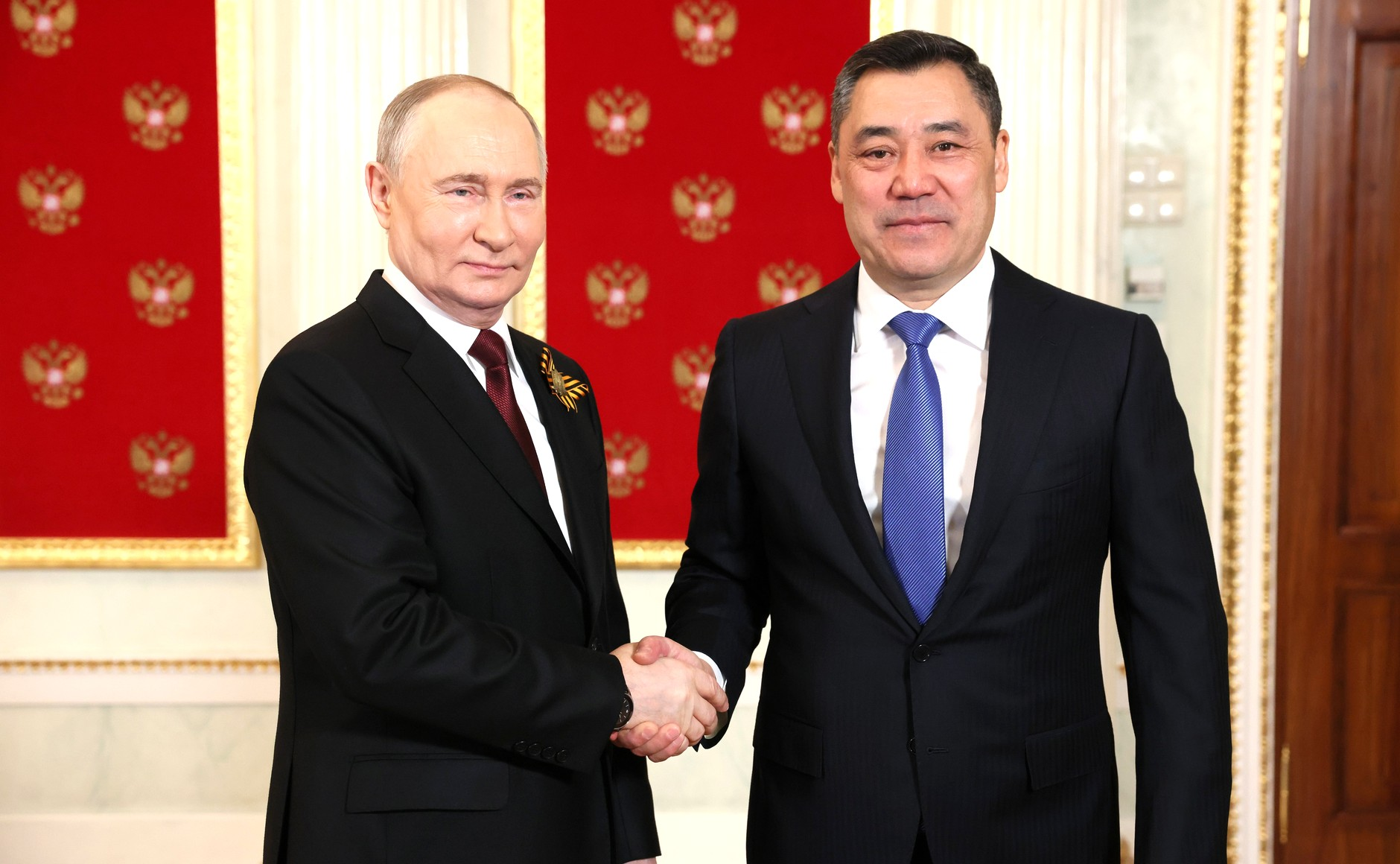
Sadyr Japarov with Russian president Vladimir Putin before the Moscow Victory Day Parade in Moscow, Russia, 9 May 2024

Japarov has adopted a pro-Russia stance. His first planned trip to a foreign country while in office was to Russia on 25–26 February 2021.

The Open Dialog Foundation in May 2023 published an extensive report entitled Russia's allies in the war against Ukraine. Kazakhstan and Kyrgyzstan are a reliable rear of the Russian army with attached materials. The Open Dialog Foundation is headquartered in Brussels and is actively supported by the European Union. The report mentions Japarov as a person who is proposed to be sanctioned for helping Russia to circumvent sanctions. From the report:

"In 2022, Kyrgyzstan exported 115,920 electric detonators to Russia worth $882,400, although it did not make any deliveries in 2021. Electric detonators are used in the production of anti-personnel and anti-tank mines. In turn, Kyrgyzstan imported 193,536 electric detonators from Canada in 2022 worth $3.7 million. There is reason to believe that Kyrgyzstan re-exported Canadian-made electric detonators to Russia. Exports of radar, radio navigation and radio remote control equipment in 2022 amounted to 169,800 dollars, which is 60% more than in 2021. The number of exports of telescopic sights (for weapons) from Kyrgyzstan to Russia in 2022 was $199,700, which is 13 times more than in 2021. Deliveries of parts of aircraft, helicopters and unmanned aerial vehicles from Kyrgyzstan to Russia increased from zero in 2021 to $1.5 million in 2022. In 2019–2021, Kyrgyzstan did not export parts of lasers, devices, and optical instruments to Russia, but in 2022, exports amounted to $193,100. In 2022, Kyrgyzstan also abnormally increased the re-export of dual-use goods: $315,700, 109 times more than in 2021. Shipments of integrated circuits from Kyrgyzstan to Russia in 2022 amounted to $612,800, which is 104 times more than in 2021. Exports of printed circuits in 2022 amounted to $23,700 – 11 times more than in 2021. The export of computers for automatic processing from Kyrgyzstan to Russia amounted to $2.5 million, which is almost 7 times more than in 2021. The export of electrical machinery and equipment for special purposes increased 9 times – from $40,700 in 2021 to $367,300 in 2022."

Some of the goods imported into Kyrgyzstan are not actually delivered to the declared destination. Since these goods are delivered to Kyrgyzstan from Europe through the territory of Russia, cargo carriers leave the goods in Russia, and in Kyrgyzstan they simply receive stamps that the goods were supposedly imported to Kyrgyzstan. This is confirmed by the Finnish national public broadcaster Yle, which in March 2023 reported, citing the head of the Finnish customs control, that some of the goods either remain in Russia on their way to Kyrgyzstan or are re-exported from Kyrgyzstan to Russia. The shipments were also investigated by representatives of Radio Liberty in Kyrgyzstan, about how companies in Kyrgyzstan and Kazakhstan supply Western equipment to Russian firms associated with the invasion of Ukraine.

The Russian edition of Kommersant also announced on 9 August 2023, the construction of a complex with an area of 163 thousand square meters in the vicinity of Bishkek. m. for parallel import of goods to Russia. As experts note, its appearance will increase the volume of high-quality warehouses in Kyrgyzstan by almost four times. However, the warehouse builders deny all allegations.

In November 2025, during Vladimir Putin's state visit to Bishkek, the Russian side announced that Gazprom had allocated more than $400 million to the gasification of Kyrgyzstan's regions, bringing gas coverage to about 42 percent. A year later Japarov publicly threatened to take back the country's gas network from the company. Speaking to residents of the Aitmatov and Manas districts of Talas Region on 3 November 2026, he said he had spent two to three years pressing Gazprom to extend gas supplies to more of the country and had warned it: "If you don't do it, I'll take it back, just like Kumtor, and do it myself." This was a reference to the Kumtor Gold Mine, which the Kyrgyz state took over from Centerra Gold in 2021–2022. Japarov said the government could not decide on expanding the network itself, because the system belonged to Gazprom. The company had acquired the national gas operator Kyrgyzgaz for a symbolic $1 in 2014, under an agreement that runs until 2039.

==== Tajikistan ====
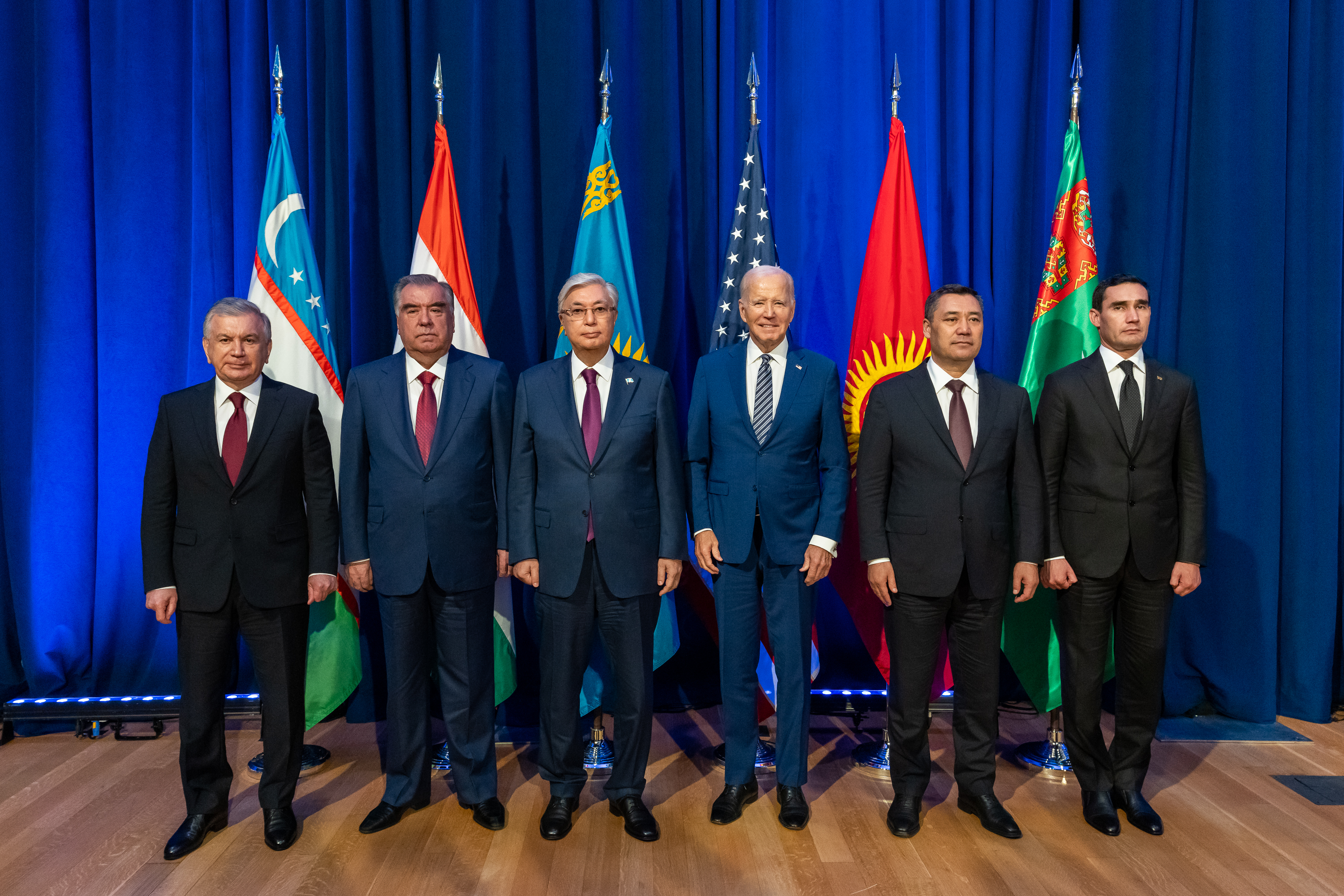
Japarov with other Central Asian leaders and Joe Biden at the C5+1 summit in New York, 19 September 2023

During the 2021 Kyrgyzstan–Tajikistan conflict, he led the Kyrgyz response to the clashes. On 30 April, he held a telephone conversation with the President of Tajikistan Emomali Rahmon, during which he agreed to participate in a face-to-face meeting in Dushanbe in the second half of May. He also proposed the creation of a peacekeeping commission composed of elders from both countries. Later that day, Japarov addressed the Kyrgyz people, where he called for calm particularly from youth, underlining that the Tajik leadership don't want a war with Kyrgyzstan, noting their experience in the Tajik Civil War. At the same time, he also accused "certain forces" of destabilizing the situation on the border. He declared 1 and 2 May as a period of nationwide mourning.

=== Diarchy with Kamchybek Tashiev ===
Since coming to power in 2020, Sadyr Japarov appointed his longtime friend Kamchybek Tashiev as the head of the State Committee for National Security, making him the second most-powerful official in Kyrgyzstan. Tashiev is infamously known for his explosive nature and putting the family members in power in all areas of executive power. Tashiev's State Committee for National Security led the government's crackdown on independent media and the opposition, and he became known for public threats against government critics.

=== 2027 presidential election ===
Japarov was elected in January 2021 to a six-year term under the previous constitution. In 2025, at his request, parliament moved the next presidential election from October 2026 to January 2027 so that he could complete that term. Early elections to the Supreme Council were held on 30 November 2025, which separated the parliamentary and presidential electoral cycles.

After the February 2026 open letter calling for an early election, Japarov asked the Constitutional Court to interpret the relevant constitutional provisions. On 17 February the court ruled that there were no grounds for an early presidential election. It also found that his current term counts as his first under the 2021 Constitution, which makes him eligible to seek a second, five-year term. On 29 July 2026 Japarov signed a decree setting the election for 27 January 2027. He has said he will seek re-election.

=== Media censorship ===
Since the start of Japarov's presidency, Kyrgyzstan has dropped 70 positions in Reporters Without Borders' freedom of speech rating - from 72nd in 2022 to 144 in 2025. Another case is the closure of the Kyrgyz Next TV channel, sanctioned by the authorities of Kyrgyzstan. Initially, the director of the TV channel was convicted for rebroadcasting media material from Kazakhstan media, and later the owner of the channel, Ravshan Jeenbekov, and his wife were imprisoned in a pre-trial detention center.

Political activist and journalist of Next TV Adilet Baltabai was arrested for speaking out against the opening of a casino in Kyrgyzstan, and sentenced to 5 years in prison.

In January 2024 eleven current and former journalists of the anti-corruption outlet Temirov Live were detained. Its founder, Bolot Temirov, said the charges were likely connected to an investigation the outlet had published in December 2023 into alleged misuse of funds by Interior Minister Ulanbek Niyazbekov. In October 2024 four of them were convicted of calls for mass unrest. In February 2025 the Supreme Court upheld prison sentences of six years for director Makhabat Tajibek kyzy and five years for presenter Azamat Ishenbekov. One of the two jailed journalists was later pardoned by Japarov. Temirov had been deported in November 2022 after a court invalidated his passport.

In February 2024 a Bishkek court ordered the liquidation of Kloop Media. After an unfavourable Supreme Court ruling, the outlet ceased operations in Kyrgyzstan in August 2024 but continued to publish from abroad. In September 2025 two of its former camera operators, Joomart Duulatov and Alexander Alexandrov, were sentenced to five years in prison for public calls for mass unrest. They said they had never produced the videos at issue, and Human Rights Watch said the prosecution had failed to provide tangible evidence. In late October 2025 Bishkek's Oktyabrsky District Court designated Kloop, Temirov Live and its Kyrgyz-language project Ait Ait Dese as extremist organisations, and also named Temirov and Kloop founder Rinat Tukhvatshin. Japarov defended the court decision against Kloop's media workers, rejected claims that press freedom was under threat, and called Kloop's reporting biased.

== Allegations of corruption ==
=== Nepotism ===
Before his presidency, Japarov has repeatedly insisted that he was against the idea of his closest relatives to interfere in political processes, as well as to hold any high government positions.

The media have repeatedly written about the numerous relatives of Japarov, who have received high positions over the past two years: Almaz Akmatov became chairman of the Accounts Chamber, Tashtanbek Kaimazarov – head of the State Migration Service, Nurbek Alimov – head of the North-Eastern Customs. Another relative of the president, Akylbek Tumonbaev, is the leader of the Eldik parliamentary group, and Turusbek Tumonbaed is head of Bishkekasphaltservice. Investigative journalists also identified relatives of the head of state in the Vostokelectro company. Japarov's niece Perizat Japarova holds the position of Deputy Head of the Digital Development Department of the Presidential Administration. Japarov's son Rustam has been the subject of several investigations by Temirov Live. The business careers of his friends were examined in a joint investigation by Kloop and the Organized Crime and Corruption Reporting Project in September 2023. Writing for RFE/RL, Chris Rickleton argued that under Japarov the state's response to independent outlets had been harshest towards those that focused most on graft and nepotism.

=== Kempir Abad case ===
More than 20 politicians and political activists were arrested in October 2022. The arrests caused massive indignation on the part of the human rights and international community. The arrests were condemned by human rights organizations such as Human Rights Watch, International Partnership for Human Rights, Amnesty International the Norwegian Helsinki Committee, and others. Activists stated that they were intimidated at meetings with authorities on border issues. In total, 27 members of the Kempir-Abad Defense Committee were charged with organising mass unrest and plotting to seize power. Their trial began in June 2023, and many were moved to house arrest during the proceedings. Prosecutors sought 20-year prison sentences. On 14 June 2024 a Bishkek court acquitted 22 of the 27 defendants, citing insufficient evidence. The Prosecutor General's Office appealed the acquittals in July 2024. After the detention, Sadyr Japarov told the mothers of the detained activists that they "should have raised their children better" and that "they themselves are to blame" President Sadyr Japarov together with head of SCNC were perceived as one of the lobbyists in the transfer of the Andijan Reservoir to the possession of Uzbekistan, the preparation of the agreement was carried out in complete secrecy and this aroused the suspicions of the public masses. At a public hearing together with the president Japarov, head of Kyrgyz special services and friend of Sadyr Japarov – Kamchybek Tashiev – made a series of threats against politicians, saying "I have already registered five or six people. After, I will hit one or two in the teeth", he said. On 3 May 2023, the Parliament of Kyrgyzstan dismissed Human Rights Ombudsman Atyr Abdrakhmatova ahead of schedule at the suggestion of the Ata-Jurt Kyrgyzstan parliamentary faction. On 19 April 2023, Atyr Abdrakhmatova presented her annual report on the situation of human rights in Kyrgyzstan, in which she pointed to the growing pressure on freedom of speech. Without listening to the Commissioner's report, the deputies voted to cancel the decision of the Committee on Constitutional Legislation of the Parliament of 18 April 2023 to take note of the report. Human rights activists suggest that the decision to early dismiss Atyr Abdrakhmatova from office is related to her activities to protect the rights of those politically persecuted in the case.

== Criticism ==
Japarov has been described as a nationalist and a populist. Among Western media, he has been compared to politicians like Ilham Aliyev and Donald Trump. Japarov is accused of adherence to Kyrgyz nationalism, with many labelling him as "a staunch nationalist inclined to violence", and an anti-Uzbek. Many allege that during the time of Japarov's work in anti-corruption departments, he "did not show significant success in the fight against corruption", being accused of having connections with a "thief in law" and northern crime boss, Kamchy Kolbaev.

In April 2021, Japarov promoted toxic Aconitum root as a treatment for COVID-19. Subsequently, at least four people were admitted to hospital suffering from poisoning. Facebook had previously removed the President's posts advocating use of the substance, saying "We've removed this post as we do not allow anyone, including elected officials, to share misinformation that could lead to imminent physical harm or spread false claims about how to cure or prevent COVID-19".

=== Fascist accusations ===
During Japarov's time working in anti-corruption departments, he developed friendly ties with Kamchybek Tashiev, the leader of the Ata-Zhurt faction, which included Sadyr Japarov – he was a vice-chairman of the party and supported its leader. The party positioned itself as far-right and ultra-nationalist – the party leadership at that time was also known for their ultra-nationalist statements on the verge of fascism:

"Pure-blooded Kyrgyz should rule Kyrgyzstan, without admixtures of other bloodlines. We always followed others: Jews, Tatars, Russians. Babanov came to power, now we are hanging out with the Kurds...If any nation in our country, Russians, Uzbeks, Turks or Chinese, say that they are equal to or superior to the Kyrgyz, then the state will fall apart "

=== Anti-Semitism ===
During the protests of 2012, Sadyr Japarov openly made anti-semitic remarks to provoke the crowd, falsely accusing Jews of seizing the Kumtor gold mine, despite the fact that the deposits were developed by the Canadian campaign together with the government of Kyrgyzstan:

"Jews took over Kumtor. Israel won it for 200 thousand dollars."

== Relations with Bakiyev ==
With coming to power, Sadyr Japarov began to appoint people close to Kurmanbek Bakiyev to senior positions. So the former press secretary of Bakiyev, Nurlanbek Shakiev, became the speaker of parliament, Talantbek Imanov, the former driver of Maxim Bakiyev's best friend – Alexei Shirshov, Taalaibek Ibrayev, also a person from Maxim Bakiyev's entourage, became the Minister of Digital Development. The former assistant to Kurmanbek Bakiyev became the governor of the Naryn region. Alexei Shirshov, a friend of Maxim Bakiyev, who was the financial director of Electric Stations OJSC and then the chairman of the board of Dastan TNK OJSC, was also able to return to the country. Shirshov is known as the author of large-scale corruption schemes in the energy sector of Kyrgyzstan, which are called "Shirshov's schemes". Shirshov was put on the wanted list by the previous authorities of Kyrgyzstan in Interpol, but was released under Sadyr Japarov immediately after his arrival in the country. Sadyr Japarov, who was the supreme commissioner in the National Agency for the Prevention of Corruption, was repeatedly accused of raiding the "Issyk-Kul" bank in order to help the business empire of the son of the ousted dictator Kurmanbek Bakiyev – Maksim Bakiev. Sadyr Zhaparov's sister – Raikul Zhaparova – in alliance with Lithuanian businessman Mikhail Nadel, friend of Maksim Bakiyev, on August 10, 2007, at 2 am on August 11, 2007, forcibly seized the Issyk-Kul investment bank by breaking the lattice of the building window. Later, Raikul Japarova, becoming the nominal chairman of the Issyk-Kul bank, carried out all the instructions of Nadel to carry out all the activities. NBKR documents stated that through this bank, Sadyr Japarov and his sister laundered $5 billion for Maxim Bakiyev. Among which, according to the statement of the previous head of the State Committee for National Security, Abdil Segizbayev, there was money from drug trafficking and arms trafficking. "He made a turnover of this money and pulled it out clean and took his interest", – stated Segizbayev.

Kurmanbek Bakiyev has been living in Belarus since 2010, fleeing with his family when he lost power in Kyrgyzstan. During clashes on April 7, 2010, weapons were used against the protesters and dozens of people died in the square near the White House. Despite the fact that criminal cases were initiated against members of the Bakiyev clan in his homeland, Alexander Lukashenko, president of Belarus, refused to extradite him to Kyrgyzstan. Over time, other relatives also moved to Belarus – the nephew of the former president Asylbek Saliev and the grandson – the son of Marat Bakiyev – Ruslan Bakiyev. In Belarus, the Bakiyevs live in luxury real estate and invest in state corporations and large businesses of Belarus.

== Public image ==
Much of Japarov's success is due to his strong social media campaigning, which has expanded in scale after his election to the president. Japarov told Kommersant in January 2021 that from 2017 to 2020, he created a power base from within prison by forming social media groups on Odnoklassniki, Facebook, Instagram, and WhatsApp. When questioned how he accomplished it from behind bars, he said, "According to the law, it is impossible, but we found a way out." However, his three years of illicit social media outreach did not appear to have spread extensively among the Kyrgyz people, since none of the respondents reported hearing of him during this period.

According to independent journalists of Kyrgyzstan, with the advent and establishment of power of Japarov and his ally Kamchybek Tashiev, fake media factories began to operate in the country in large numbers. The journalists managed to find out that employees of state media are massively involved in them, where they are also supervised by press secretaries of ministries, obliging them to write positive comments about government officials.

== Personal life ==
Japarov is married to Aigul Japarova (née Asanbaeva), who is five years his junior. She was born in the neighboring village to Japarov's in the Tüp District. During his acting presidency, she volunteered to help volunteers in the fight against the COVID-19 pandemic. He is also the father of four children, with his eldest son Dastan having died on 26 August 2019 in an accident. His father and mother died in September 2017 and March 2019, respectively, during his prosecution and prison term. In neither case was Japarov allowed by the State Penitentiary Service to attend the funeral. It is known that one of his brothers owns one of the coal mines in the north of the country.

== Awards and honorifics ==
- Badge "Excellent Worker of the Soviet Army"
- In 2009, he was awarded the medal of the Issyk-Kul Regional State Administration "for merits and significant contribution to the socio-economic development of the Issyk-Kul region."
- In 2010, he was awarded the Medal "For Merit" of the Russian Union of Afghanistan Veterans
- In 2024, he was awarded the Order of Friendship, 1st class for his contribution to the development and strengthening of bilateral relations.
- In 2025 he was awarded the Kazakh Order of the Golden Eagle.
- In 2026, he was awarded the Supreme Order of Turkic World

He also holds the following titles:

- Honorary President of the Mixed Martial Arts Federation of Kyrgyzstan
- In 2026 he was awarded the Heydar Aliyev Order

== See also ==
- List of current heads of state and government

== Notes ==
Political offices
Preceded by Kubatbek Boronov	Prime Minister of Kyrgyzstan; 2020	Succeeded by Artem Novikov; Acting; Ulukbek Maripov
Preceded by Talant Mamytov; Acting	President of Kyrgyzstan; 2021–present	Incumbent
