= Ulukbek Maripov =

First Chairman of the Cabinet of Ministers of Kyrgyzstan

- Улукбек Марипов
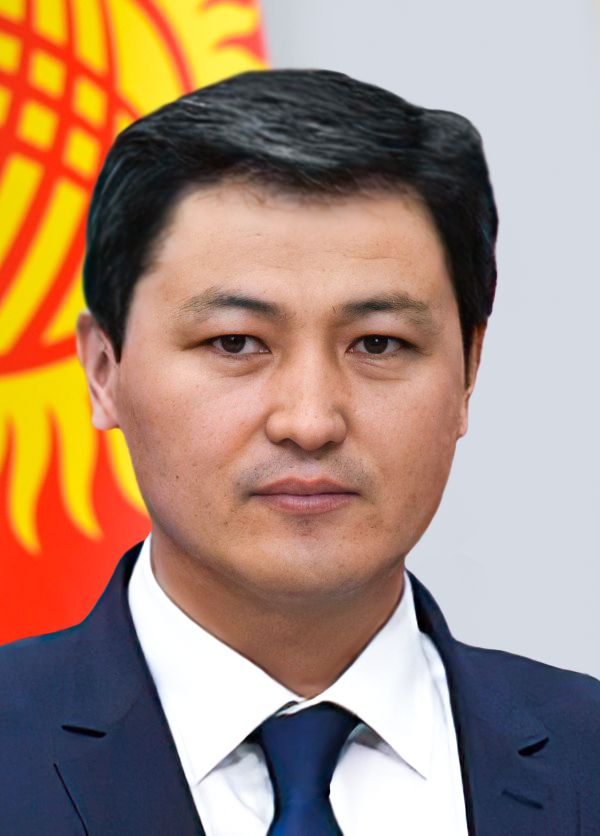
- Maripov in 2021

1st Chairman of the Cabinet of Ministers of Kyrgyzstan
- In office 5 May 2021 – 12 October 2021
- President: Sadyr Japarov
- Preceded by: himself (as Prime Minister)
- Succeeded by: Akylbek Japarov

23rd Prime Minister of Kyrgyzstan
- In office 3 February 2021 – 5 May 2021
- President: Sadyr Japarov
- Preceded by: Artem Novikov
- Succeeded by: himself (as Chairman of the Cabinet of Ministers)

Personal details
- Born: 30 August 1979 (age 46) Kyrgyz-Ata, Kirghiz SSR, Soviet Union
- Party: Independent
- Education: Osh State University

Ulukbek Asamidin uulu Maripov (Kyrgyz: Улукбек Асамидин уулу Марипов; born 30 August 1979) is a Kyrgyz politician who served as Chairman of the Cabinet of Ministers of Kyrgyzstan from 5 May 2021 to 12 October 2021. He was the first to serve in this position after the post of the Prime Minister was abolished. Prior to being appointed Prime Minister, Maripov had led the Kyrgyz Account Chamber.

== Early life and career ==
Maripov was born on 30 August 1979, in the village of Kyrgyz-Ata in the Osh Region. He is the son of former deputy Asamuddin Maripov. A graduate of the Osh State University in finance and credit and jurisprudence, he worked at the Ministry of Finance from 2001 to 2003. From 2003 to 2005, he was assistant to the Governor of the Batken Oblast, then deputy consultant to the Parliament from 2005 to 2006. He also worked for the presidential administration for the remainder of the decade. In 2010, he was appointed Head of the Department of International Cooperation at the Ministry of Emergency Situations. From 2010 to 2016, he worked with the services of the presidency, where he rose in 2015 as deputy chief of staff to President Almazbek Atambayev. On 19 March 2016, he was President of the Court of Auditors, a position he held until 2021. Since 25.01.2022, Ambassador Extraordinary and Plenipotentiary of the Kyrgyz Republic to the Kingdom of Saudi Arabia. In November 2022, by decree of the President of the Kyrgyz Republic Sadyr Zhaparov, Maripov was appointed Ambassador Extraordinary and Plenipotentiary of Kyrgyzstan to Bahrain and Egypt concurrently.

== Leader of the Kyrgyz government ==
=== Premiership ===
The ruling coalition chose Maripov as the candidate for Prime Minister. The government composition was announced on February 2, approved by Parliament on February 3 and was sworn in on the same day. On assuming the role of prime minister, Maripov reduced the size of the Kyrgyz Cabinet, with a reduction in the number of executive bodies to 16 from their previous number of 22. Immediately after his appointment, he headed to the Eurasian Intergovernmental Council (EIC) in Almaty, where he held meetings with Russian Prime Minister Mikhail Mishustin, Belarusian Prime Minister Roman Golovchenko and Armenian Premier Nikol Pashinyan. Following the 2021 Kyrgyzstan–Tajikistan conflict, he announced that the Batken Region, where the border conflict took place, will receive a special status.

=== Cabinet Chairman ===
On 5 May, President Sadyr Japarov signed the order appointing Maripov as Chairman of the Cabinet of Ministers. He was replaced by Akylbek Japarov as acting chairman on 12 October.

== After the premiership ==
Since 25 January 2022 Ulukbek Maripov is ambassador of Kyrgyzstan to the Saudi Arabia. On 25 November 2022 he was appointed as ambassador of Kyrgyzstan to Bahrain and Egypt.

== Personal life ==
He holds the rank of civil service counselor of the III class. In addition to Kyrgyz, he speaks Russian and English. His brother Baktybek Maripov worked as akim of the Nookat District from November 2020 until his dismissal in February 2021.
