= 2021 Kyrgyz presidential election =

- 10 January 2021
- Registered: 3,563,574
- Turnout: 39.16% (▼17.16pp)
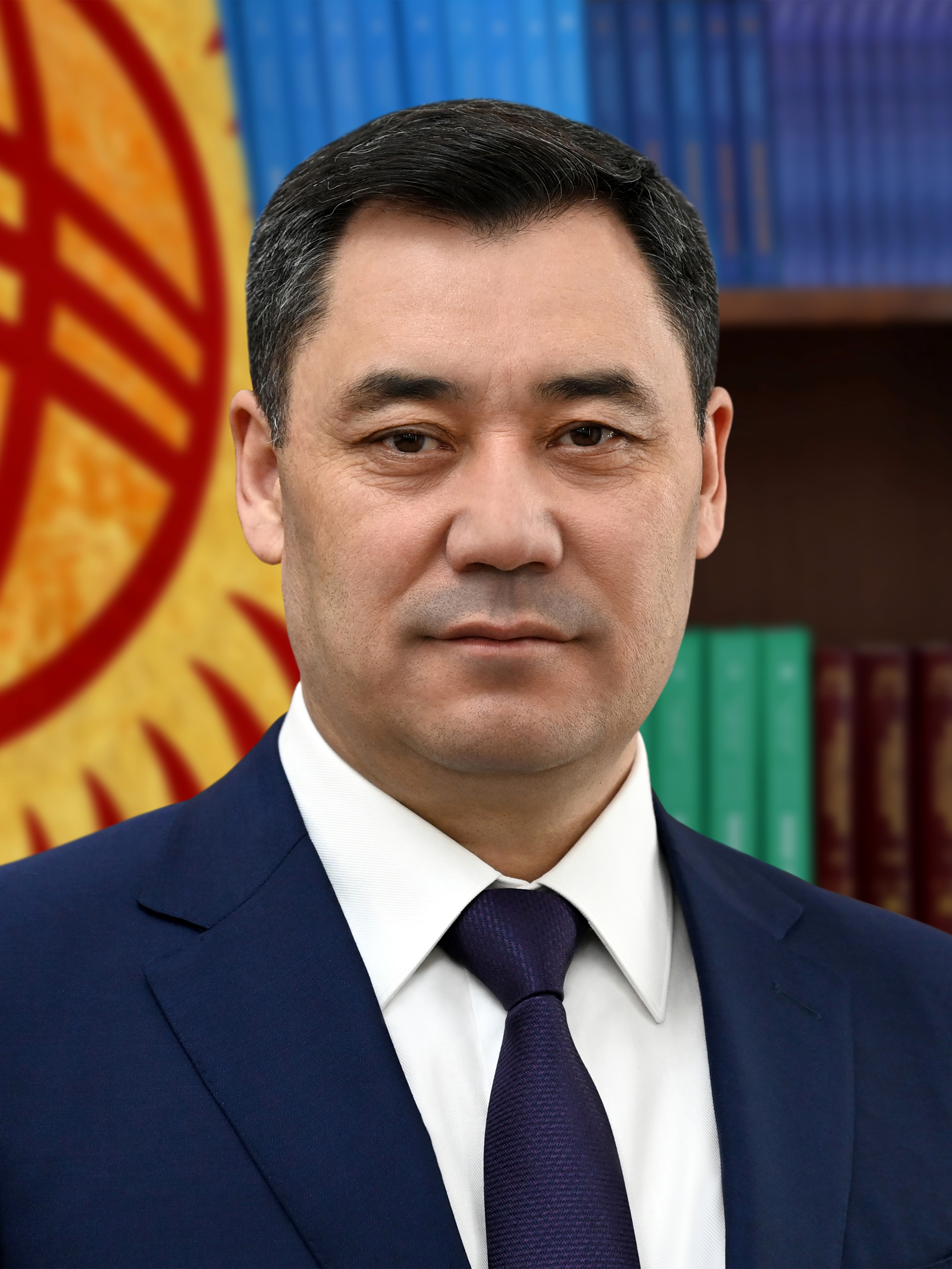

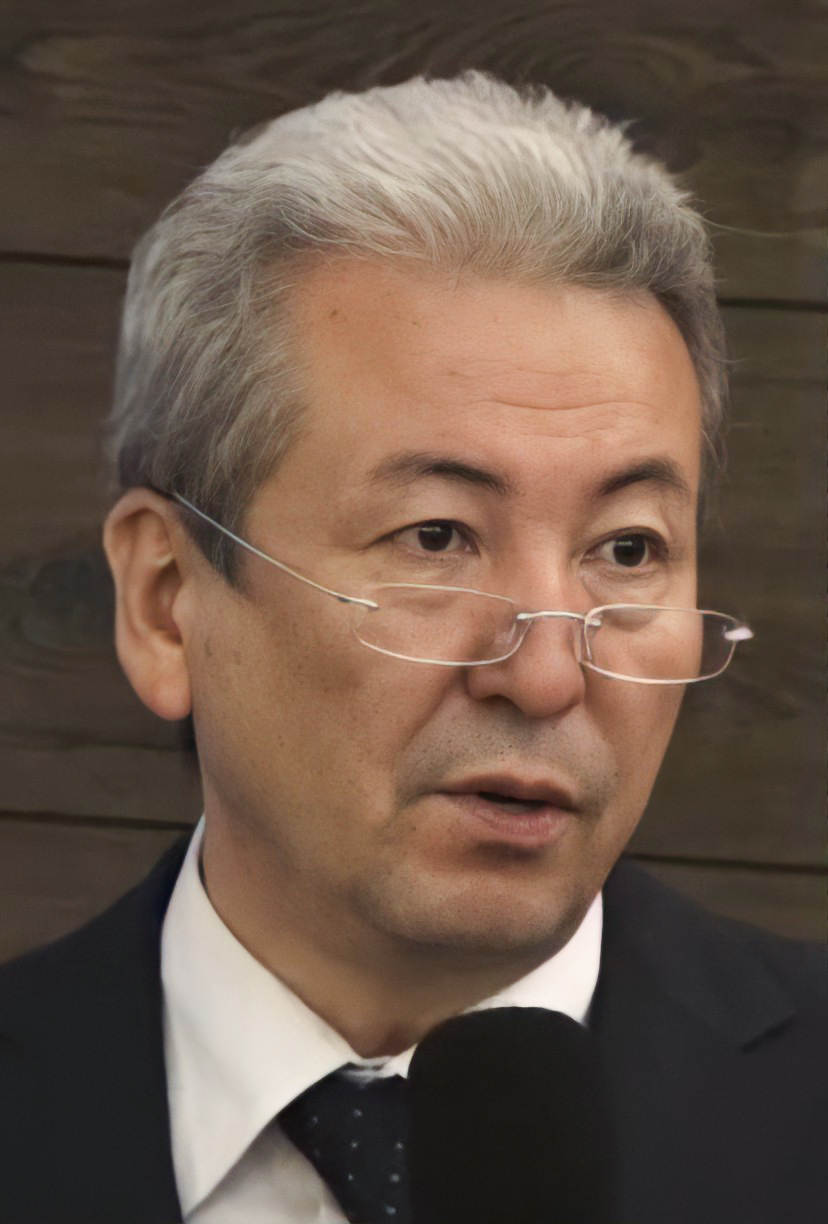
Nominee	Sadyr Japarov	Adakhan Madumarov
Party	Mekenchil	Butun Kyrgyzstan
Popular vote	1,105,248	94,741
Percentage	79.83%	6.84%
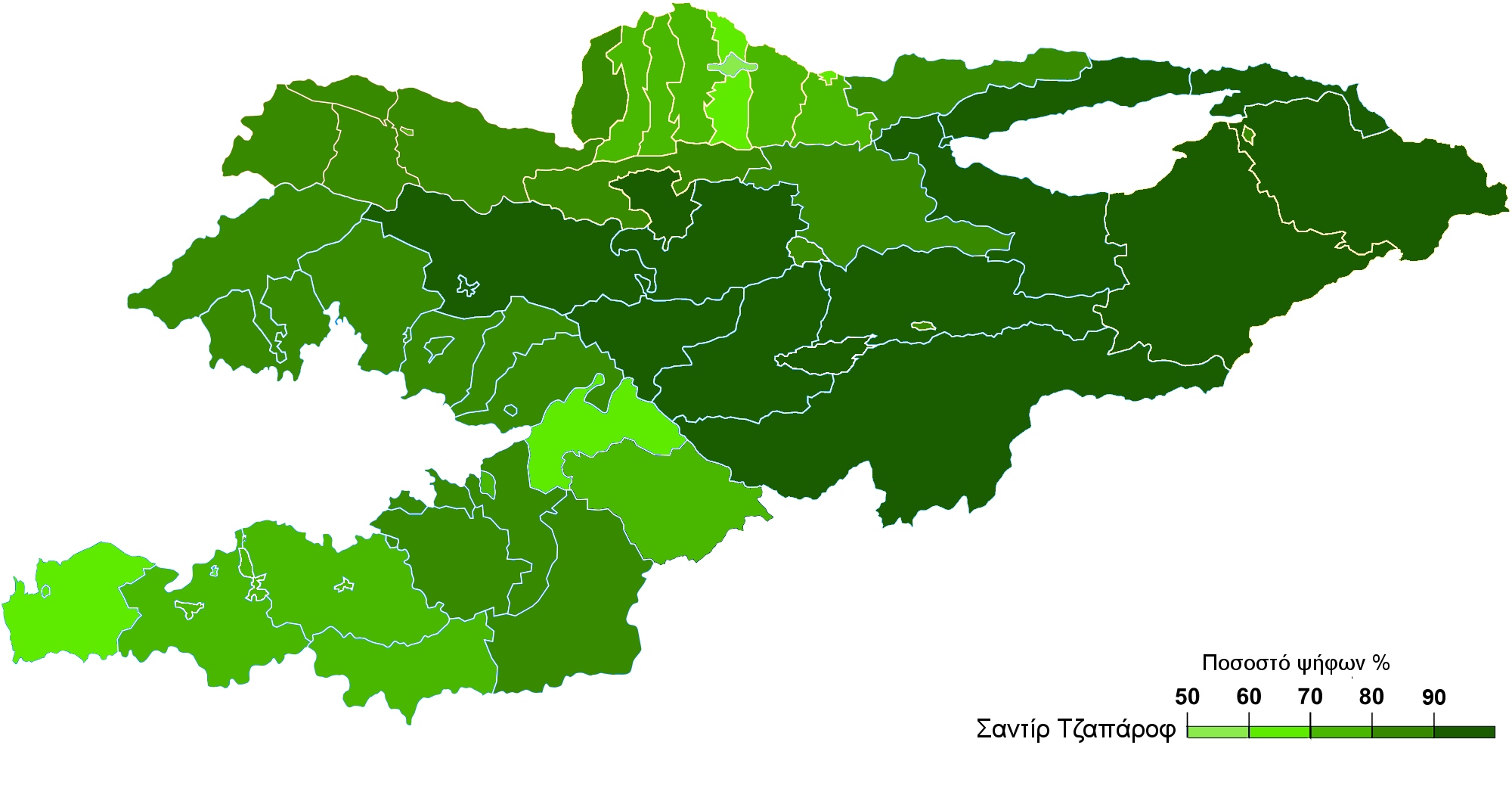
- Results by district; all were won by Japarov
President before election
Talant Mamytov (acting)
Respublika
Elected President
Sadyr Japarov
Mekenchil

Snap presidential elections were held in Kyrgyzstan on 10 January 2021, alongside a constitutional referendum. The elections were called early following the resignation of President Sooronbay Jeenbekov in the wake of the 2020 Kyrgyzstani protests.

== Background ==
On 24 October 2020, the Central Electoral Commission of Kyrgyzstan (BShK) announced that an early presidential election would be held on 10 January 2021. The announcement of the early election occurred after several weeks of public protests and political chaos which caused the resignation of President Sooronbai Jeenbekov. The upheaval followed accusations of election corruption occurring in the October 2020 parliamentary elections, which were subsequently annulled by the Central Electoral Commission.

These elections follow an extended period of upheaval and represent a culmination of popular discontent stemming from the perceived 'mismanagement' of the COVID-19 pandemic, and widespread political corruption. These elections will invoke Kyrgyzstan's 3rd 'formal' change of government (5th when considering the effects of two 'informal' altercations – a 'constitutional coup' in 2017, and the "large demonstration gone wrong" of the 5th of October 2020) in recent years.

Former President Jeenbekov had "failed to attend to public grievances", and as such a "crisis of authentic figures" emerged in the aftermath of his ousting from power in October 2020. Prominent nationalist political figure Sadyr Japarov rose to "fill" this political space after being freed from prison by protestors and assuming the role of interim prime minister following the resignation of Jeenbekov. Amid national "revolutionary fervor", Japarov was acquitted of an 11.5-year sentence for kidnapping a local official and became Kyrgyzstan's acting president with plans for new constitutional and presidential elections. Japarov cites a clean reputation, with no record of corruption.

== Electoral system ==
In the aftermath of Soviet collapse, Kyrgyzstan has been long regarded an "island of democracy" amidst a largely authoritarian Central Asia. Schmitter and Karl provide a useful framework by which one may determine 'democracy' within What Democracy Is... and Is Not, outlining six "key" components within a broader assertion that there exist many types of democracy, and that their diverse practices produce similarly varied set of effects. Prior to October 2021, Kyrgyzstan was considered one of Central Asia's "most successful – if turbulent – democracies," practicing seemingly open and fair elections. Such turbulence is palpable when considering Schmitter and Karl's definition of modern political democracy as a "system of governance in which rulers are held accountable for their actions in the public realm by citizens, acting indirectly through the competition and cooperation of their elected representatives". As Jeenbekov was deposed in October 2020 through popular uprising – and not by 'formal' political procedure – it is possible to conceive of the failings of pre-election, and pre-constitutional referendum, democracy in this sense.

The elections were held using the two-round system, where if no candidate received a majority in the first round, a second would be held between the top two finishers. Under the 2010 constitution, the presidential term is six years. Re-election was not permitted.

In order to register, applicants had until 4 December 2020 to gather 30,000 signatures in support of their candidacy and pay a ballot access fee of KGS 1,000,000 (US$11,830).

== Results ==
As of 14 November 2020, 63 individuals had filed applications to run for the office. On 4 December, the Central Committee on Elections announced the final list of 19 approved candidates.

It was announced that whilst the requirements for candidacy had been provisionally met by all 19, the final number was subject to decrease pending verification of the signatures provided within their applications. Candidates were permitted to begin formally campaigning from the 15th of December 2020, with 'early' presidential elections scheduled for January 10, 2021.

All candidates officially ran as independents, although some were supported by their respective political parties. On the final electoral ballot were listed 17 candidates including: Sadyr Japarov – aforementioned interim President following the resignation of former-President Sooronbai Jeenbekov – former head of the State National Security Committee (Государственный Комитет Национальной Безопасности) Abdil Segizbayev, journalist Kanybek Imanaliev, ex-deputy head of the Ministry of Internal Affairs (МВД) Kursan Asanov, and entrepreneur Arstanbek Abdyldaev. There was one female registered presidential candidate.

According to a 2021 report by the OSCE (the Organization for Security and Co-operation in Europe), the verification of signatures by the Central Committee on Elections (Центральная Избирательная Комиссия Киргизской Республики) was "transparent and consistent".

Sadyr Japarov won the election handily, receiving nearly 80% of the vote. A total of 10,851 ballots returned were invalid, in addition to 196 which were retrieved from invalid portable ballot boxes. Turnout was 39.16%. The results of the simultaneous constitutional referendum meant that Kyrgyzstan would resort to a 'presidential', rather than a 'parliamentary' style of government.

Fewer than 40% of eligible voters participated in these 'snap' presidential elections. According to Radio Free Europe/ Radio Liberty's Kyrgyz service (Azattyk.org) out of a national 'voting' population of 3.56 million, only 1.354 million ballots were cast. Sadyr Japarov received the 2nd highest percentage of votes in the entire history of Kyrgyz presidential elections – falling just short of Kurmanbek Bakiev's 89.5% in 2005.

According to a 2021 report by the OSCE (the Organization for Security and Co-operation in Europe), the January presidential election in Kyrgyzstan was "well organized and fundamental freedoms were generally respected". However, presidential elections were conducted in synchronicity with 'snap' constitutional referendums that "weakened both the election process and public debate". It is critical that this election was "dominated by one candidate who benefitted from disproportionately large financial means and misuse of administrative resources, resulting in an uneven playing field". Whilst the legal framework of these elections "provides a sound basis for democracy", allegations of such misuse of administrative resources may include the "directed attendance of state employees at rallies... pressure on state officials and voters, as well as concerns about the involvement of organised crime in the election." It is also significant that gender equality issues were "nearly absent" from the campaign.

By the end of 2021, Kyrgyzstan's status according to the 'Freedom of the World Index' declined from 'Partly Free', to 'Not Free' as a result of "deeply flawed parliamentary elections [that] featured significant political violence and intimidation that culminated in the irregular seizure of power...".

Candidate	Party	Votes	%
Sadyr Japarov	Mekenchil	1,105,248	79.83
Adakhan Madumarov	United Kyrgyzstan	94,741	6.84
Babur Tolbayev	Independent	32,979	2.38
Myktybek Arstanbek	Bir Bol	23,583	1.70
Abdil Segizbaev	Independent	20,335	1.47
Imamidin Tashov	Independent	16,383	1.18
Klara Sooronkulova	Reform	14,005	1.01
Aymen Kasenov	Independent	12,684	0.92
Ulukbek Kochkorov	New Age	9,397	0.68
Kanatbek Isaev	Kyrgyzstan	8,038	0.58
Eldar Abakirov	Independent	6,996	0.51
Baktybek Kalmamatov	Independent	6,893	0.50
Kursan Asanov	Independent	6,885	0.50
Ravshan Jeenbekov	Independent	2,652	0.19
Kanybek Imanaliev	Ata-Meken	2,490	0.18
Jenishbek Baiguttiev	Independent	1,327	0.10
Arstanbek Abdyldayev	For the People	1,157	0.08
Against all		18,673	1.35
Total		1,384,466	100.00
Valid votes		1,384,466	99.21
Invalid/blank votes		11,047	0.79
Total votes		1,395,513	100.00
Registered voters/turnout		3,563,574	39.16
Source: CEC, CEC

== See also ==
- List of leaders of Kyrgyzstan
- President of Kyrgyzstan
- Vice President of Kyrgyzstan
