= Mukhammedkalyi Abylgaziev =

Kyrgyz politician (born 1968)

Muhammetkalyi Abylgaziev
- Мухамметкалый Абылгазиев
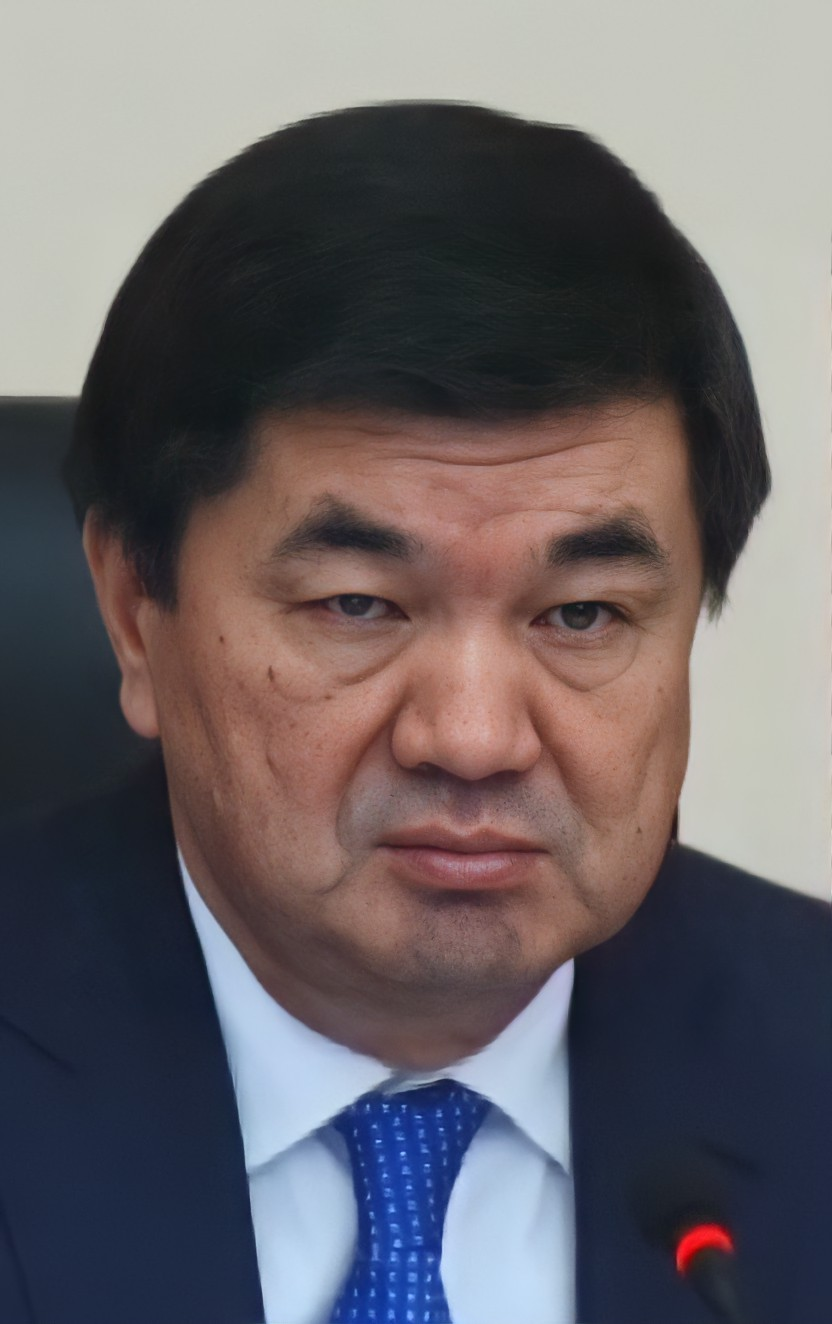
- Abylgaziyev in 2019

20th Prime Minister of Kyrgyzstan
- In office 20 April 2018 – 15 June 2020
- President: Sooronbay Jeenbekov
- Preceded by: Sapar Isakov
- Succeeded by: Kubatbek Boronov
- In office 22 August 2017 – 26 August 2017; Acting
- President: Almazbek Atambayev
- Preceded by: Sooronbay Jeenbekov
- Succeeded by: Sapar Isakov

First Deputy Prime Minister of Kyrgyzstan
- In office 13 April 2016 – 22 August 2017
- Prime Minister: Sooronbay Jeenbekov
- Preceded by: Tairbek Sarpashev
- Succeeded by: Tolkunbek Abdygulov

Personal details
- Born: 20 January 1968 (age 58) Kochkor, Kirghiz SSR, Soviet Union (now Kyrgyzstan)
- Party: Independent

Mukhammetkalyi Düysheke uulu Abylgaziev (Note: Kyrgyz: Мухамметкалый Дүйшеке уулу Абылгазиев, pronounced [mʊχamétqɑɫɯ́ɪ tʉɪɕekʰé‿uːɫʊ́ ɑβɯ́ɫʁazʲíjɪf]) (born 20 January 1968) is a Kyrgyz politician. He was the first deputy prime minister of Kyrgyzstan from April 2016 to August 2017, acting prime minister of Kyrgyzstan from 22 to 26 August 2017, and Prime Minister of Kyrgyzstan from April 2018 until his resignation in June 2020, during a criminal investigation into his government's sale of radio frequencies.

== Early life and education ==
Abylgaziev was born on 20 January 1968 in the Kochkor District of the Naryn Oblast in the Kyrgyz SSR. In 1994 he graduated from the Agricultural Institute named after Konstantin Skryabin with a specialization in Agronomy. In 1997 he graduated from the Faculty of Economics and Business at the International University of Kyrgyzstan. He worked in financial companies from 1994 to 1999 and had since 1999 worked for the City of Bishkek. From 2003 to 2016, he worked at the Social Fund, serving as its head from 2010 to 2016.

== In government ==
From April 13, 2016 to August 22, 2017, he joined the government as First Deputy Prime Minister. Abylgaziev was the acting prime minister of Kyrgyzstan from 22 August to 26 August 2017. He joined the Presidential Administration after his dismissal from this post to serve as a presidential advisor, and a month later, was appointed First Deputy Chief of Staff. From March 16 to April 20, 2018, he served as Chief of Staff to President Sooronbay Jeenbekov.

== Prime Minister of Kyrgyzstan ==
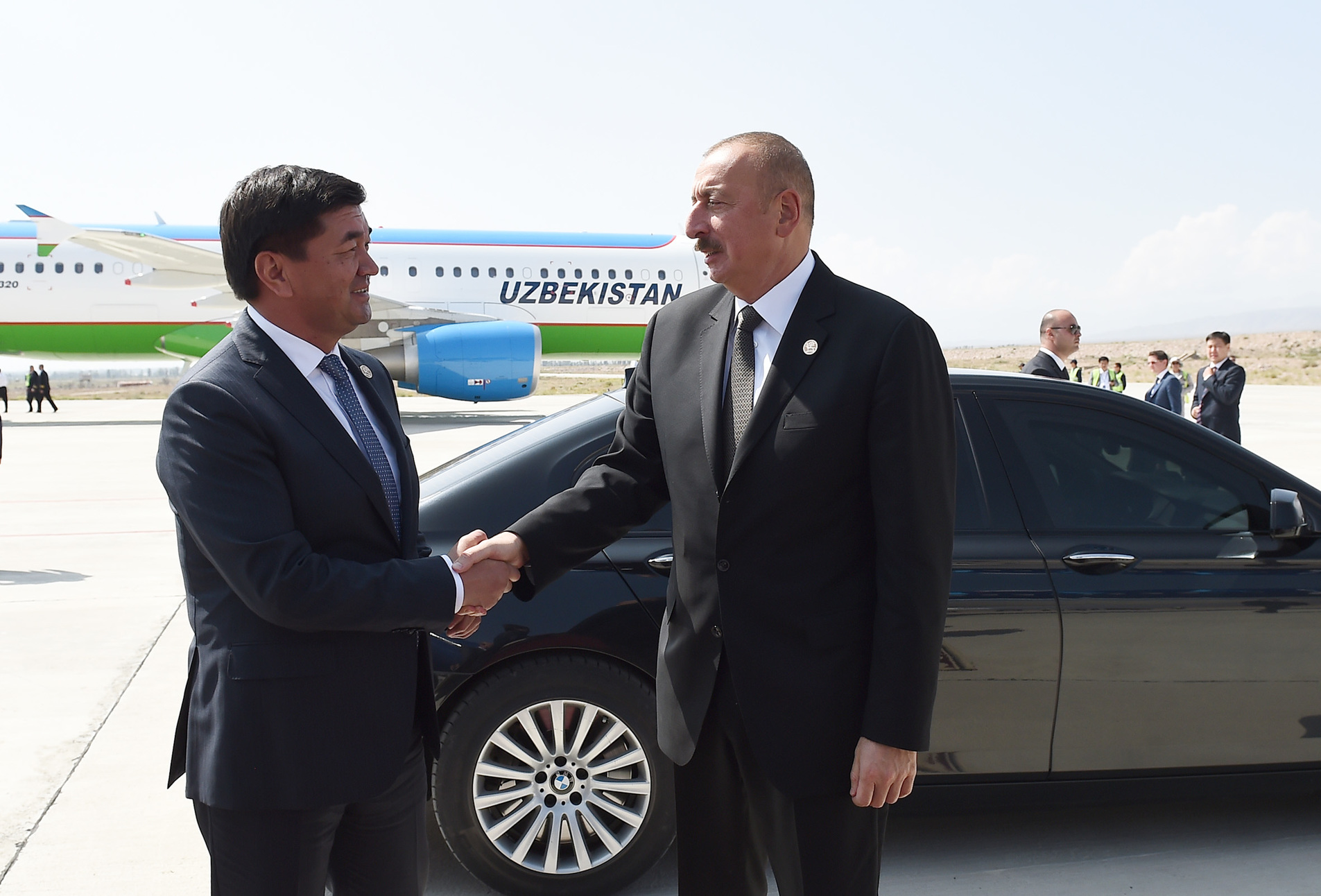
Abylgaziev with President Ilham Aliyev of Azerbaijan in September 2018

He was appointed following Sooronbay Jeenbekov's resignation to contest the October 2017 presidential election. Abulgaziyev previously served as deputy prime minister. On 20 April 2018 he was reappointed prime minister by President Sooronbay Jeenbekov, after Prime Minister Sapar Isakov's government was sacked. On 25 April the new government was sworn in.

During his term, Abylgaziev met frequently with other heads of government, including with Kazakh prime minister Bakhytzhan Sagintayev, Russian prime minister Dmitry Medvedev, Pakistani prime minister Imran Khan, Armenian prime minister Nikol Pashinyan, Chinese premier Li Keqiang and Turkish president Recep Tayyip Erdoğan.

On 15 June 2020, Abylgaziev resigned from his post as prime minister in connection with criminal allegations against the government on the extension and renewal of radio frequency resources, though Abylgaziev denied any wrongdoing.

=== Cabinet ===
As at 25 April 2018:

- Deputy prime ministers
  - Kubatbek Boronov
  - Jenish Razakov
  - Altynai Omurbekov
  - Zamirbek Askarov
- Minister of Agriculture, Food Industry and Melioration – Nurbek Murashev
- Minister of Culture, Information and Tourism – Sultanbek Jumagulov
- Minister of the Economy – Oleg Pankratov
- Minister of Education and Science – Gulmira Kudayberdieva
- Minister of Emergency Situations – Nurbolot Mirzakhmedov
- Minister of Finance – Adylbek Kasymaliev
- Minister of Foreign Affairs – Erlan Abdyldayev
- Minister of Health Care – Kosmosbek Cholponbaev
- Minister of Internal Affairs – Kashkar Dzhunushaliev
- Minister of Justice – Ainur Abdyldaeva
- Minister of Labor and Social Development – Taalaikul Isakunova
- Minister of Transport and Roads – Zhamshitbek Kalilov
- Chairman of the State Committee for National Security – Idris Kadyrkulov
- Chairman of the State Committee for Defense Affairs – Erlis Terdikbayev
- Chairman of the State Committee for Industry, Energy and Subsoil Use – Ulanbek Ryskulov
- Chairman of the State Committee of Information Technologies and Communications – Bakyt Sharshembiev

== Notes ==
Political offices
| Preceded by Sooronbay Jeenbekov | Prime Minister of Kyrgyzstan; Acting; 2017 | Succeeded by Sapar Isakov |
| Preceded by Sapar Isakov | Prime Minister of Kyrgyzstan; 2018–2020 | Succeeded by Kubatbek Boronov |
