= Kubatbek Boronov =

Kyrgyz politician (born 1964)

- Кубатбек Боронов
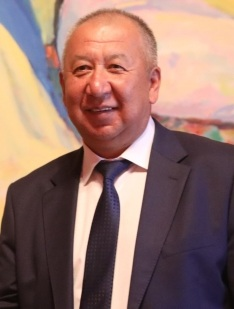
- Boronov in 2017

21st Prime Minister of Kyrgyzstan
- In office 17 June 2020 – 6 October 2020
- President: Sooronbay Jeenbekov
- Deputy: Almazbek Baatyrbekov
- Preceded by: Mukhammedkalyi Abylgaziev
- Succeeded by: Sadyr Japarov

First Vice-Prime Minister of Kyrgyzstan
- In office 20 April 2018 – 16 June 2020
- President: Sooronbay Jeenbekov
- Prime Minister: Mukhammedkalyi Abylgaziev
- Preceded by: Tolgunbek Abdygulov
- Succeeded by: Almazbek Baatyrbekov

Personal details
- Born: 15 December 1964 (age 61) Uzgen District, Osh Region, Kirghiz SSR, Soviet Union
- Party: Independent

Kubatbek Aiylchievich Boronov (Kyrgyz: Кубатбек Айылчиевич Боронов; born 15 December 1964) is a Kyrgyz politician who served as the Prime Minister of Kyrgyzstan from 17 June 2020 to 6 October 2020.

Prior to being named prime minister Boronov had served as First Deputy Prime Minister from April 2018. He has also served as the Minister of Emergency Situations from 2011 to 2018.

Likely due to pressure from the ongoing 2020 Kyrgyzstani protests, Boronov resigned from his position as prime minister, citing parliamentary deputy Myktybek Abdyldayev as the new speaker. On 9 October, President Sooronbay Jeenbekov accepted Boronov's resignation.

Political offices
Preceded by Mukhammedkalyi Abylgaziev	Prime Minister of Kyrgyzstan; 2020	Succeeded by Sadyr Japarov
