= 2020 Kyrgyz Revolution =

Protests against the 2020 parliamentary election

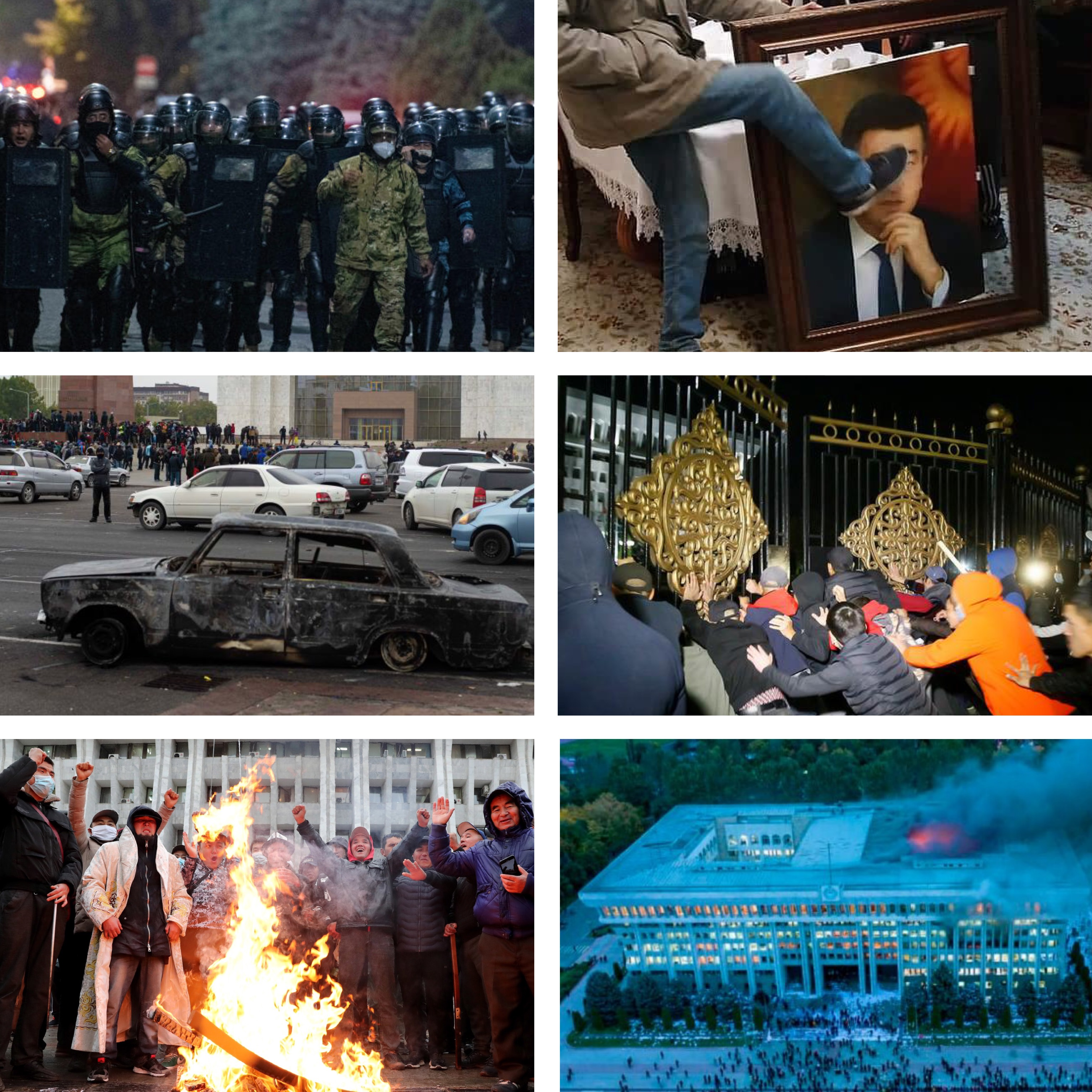
- The events of the protests. From left to right: Troops deployed to control the protests; A protester kicks Jeenbekov's portrait; A car burning in the middle of Bishkek; Protesters break into the White House; Protesters gathered around a makeshift campfire at the White House; The right wing of the White House was burnt down by the protesters
- Date: 5 October 2020 – 15 October 2020 (1 week and 3 days)
- Location: Bishkek, Kyrgyzstan
- Caused by: Alleged electoral fraud in the October 2020 Kyrgyz parliamentary election; Government corruption; Government response to the COVID-19 pandemic; Arrest and conviction of former president Almazbek Atambayev on corruption charges
- Goals: Resignation of President Sooronbay Jeenbekov; Resignation of the government; Dissolution of the newly-elected parliament; New free and fair elections
- Methods: Demonstrations, civil disobedience, riots
- Result: President Jeenbekov resigns; Prime Minister Kubatbek Boronov resigns; Parliamentary Speaker Dastan Jumabekov resigns; Election results annulled on 6 October 2020; Former president Atambayev freed from jail; Mass looting in Bishkek on 8 October 2020; State of emergency declared in Bishkek; The Armed Forces of Kyrgyzstan deploy across the capital; Prime Minister Sadyr Japarov becomes acting president on 15 October 2020

Parties
Government of Kyrgyzstan: Pro-government parties; Social Democratic Party of Kyrgyzstan; Birimdik; Mekenim Kyrgyzstan (factions); Kyrgyzstan party; Law enforcement	Protesters; People's Coordinating Council; Ata Meken Socialist Party; Bir Bol; Respublika; Reform Party; United Kyrgyzstan; Zamandash; Social Democrats; Chon Kazat; Iyman Nuru	Sadyr Japarov supporters: Mekenchil; Mekenim Kyrgyzstan (factions); Protesters

Lead figures
Sooronbay Jeenbekov	Ömürbek Babanov; Almazbek Atambayev; Adakhan Madumarov; Tilek Toktogaziev	Sadyr Japarov

Number
	Thousands	

Casualties
- Death: 1 protester
- Injuries: 1,000+

The 2020 Kyrgyz Revolution, (Note: Kyrgyz: Кыргызстандагы төңкөрүш, romanized: Kyrgyzstandagy töngkörüsh) also known as the Third Kyrgyz Revolution, (Note: Kyrgyz: Үчүнчү революция, romanized: Üchünchü revoliucia) began on 5 October 2020, in response to the previous day's parliamentary election that was perceived by protestors as unfair, with allegations of electoral fraud. The results of the election were annulled on 6 October 2020. On 12 October 2020, President Sooronbay Jeenbekov announced a state of emergency in the capital city of Bishkek, which was approved the following day by the country's parliament, the Supreme Council. Jeenbekov resigned on 15 October 2020.

== Background ==
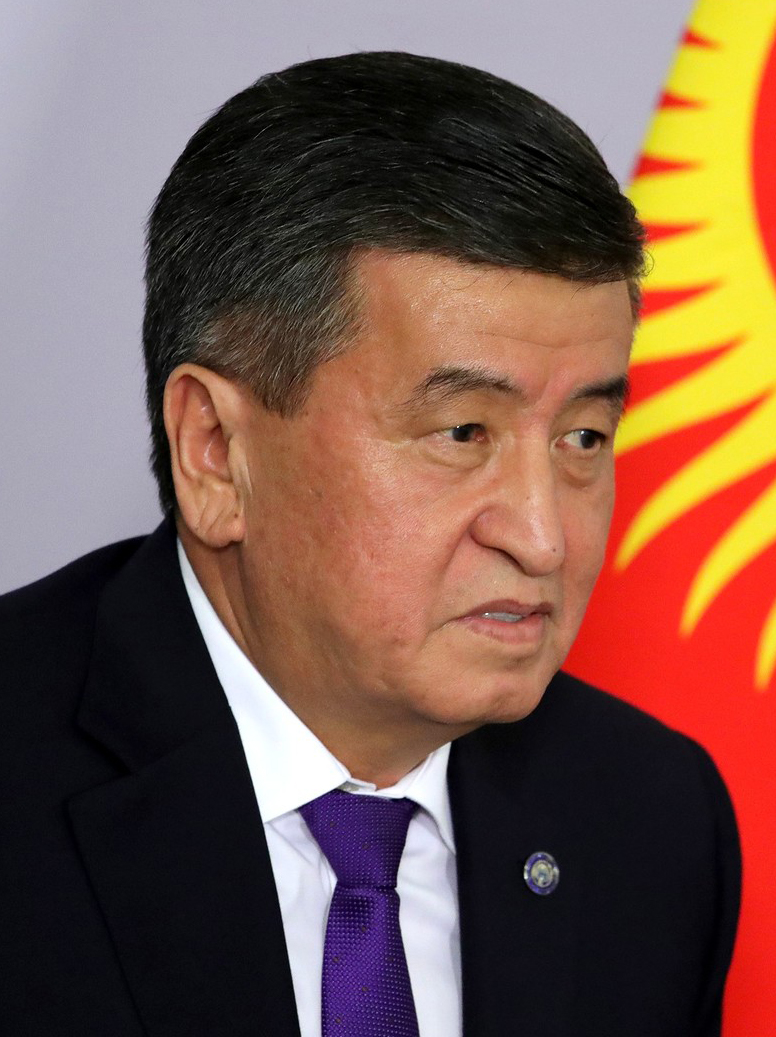
Jeenbekov in 2018

Kyrgyzstan had faced two revolutions during the early 21st century, namely the Tulip Revolution in 2005 and the Kyrgyz Revolution of 2010. In August 2020 Kyrgyz president, Sooronbay Jeenbekov, indicated that the parliamentary elections would not be postponed despite the coronavirus pandemic. During the elections, several parties were accused of buying votes. Several journalists also reported that they had been harassed or attacked. Out of the parties that made it into parliament, only United Kyrgyzstan consistently opposed the incumbent government led by Jeenbekov.

Political analysts have tied the 2020 protests to a socio-economic divide between Kyrgyzstan's agrarian south and more-developed north. Of the initial election results, 100 of the 120 seats were filled by southerners who supported Jeenbekov.

== Timeline ==
=== 5 October ===
The protests began on 5 October 2020, with a crowd of 1,000 people, that grew to at least 5,000 people by evening in Bishkek, the capital, in protest against the results of and allegations of vote-buying in the 2020 parliamentary election. After nightfall, following a police operation to clear the Ala-Too Square of protesters with tear gas and water cannons, protesters allegedly attacked police officers with rocks and injured two of them.

=== 6 October ===
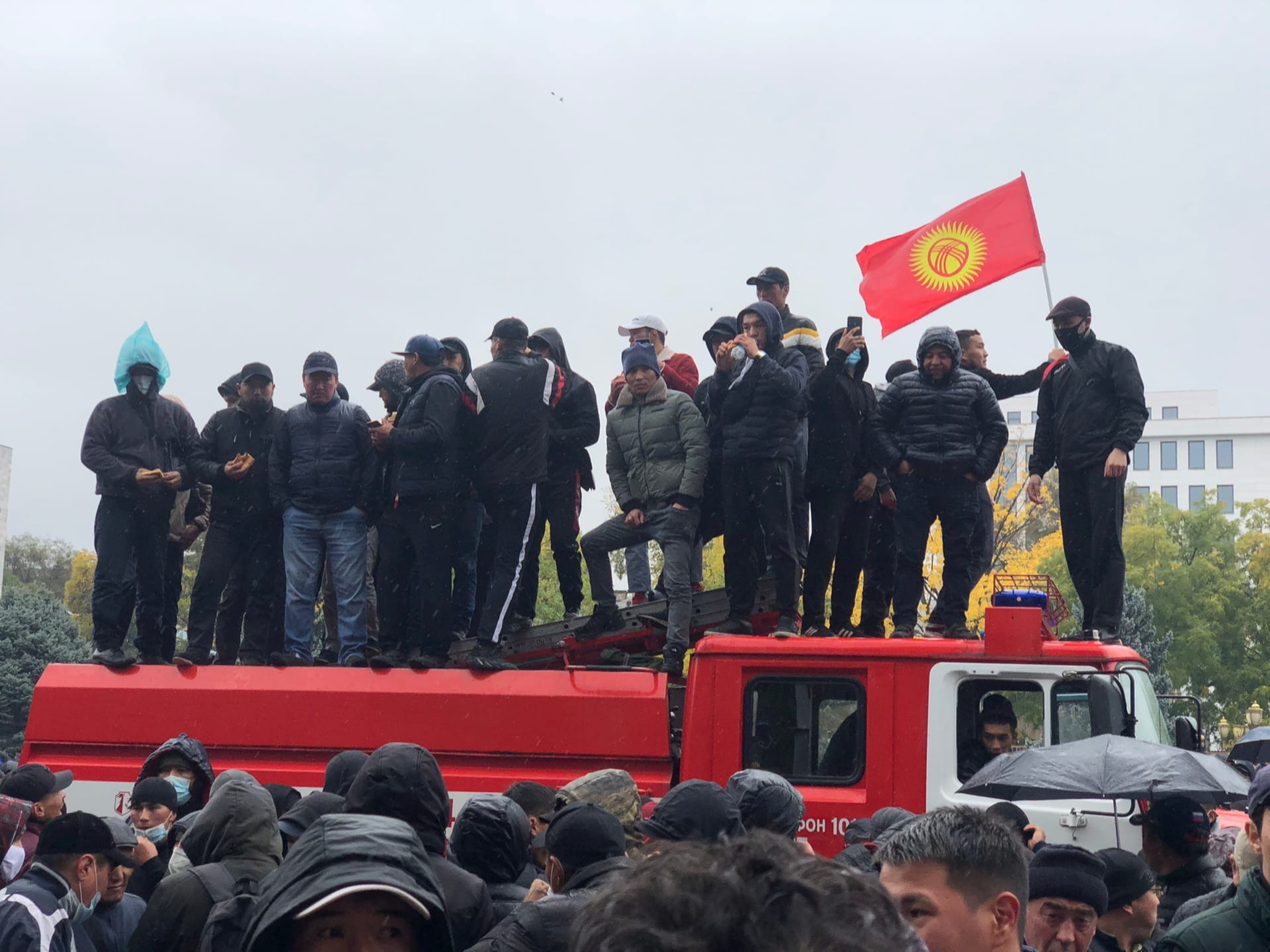
A seized fire truck outside the White House on 6 October 2020

In the early morning of 6 October 2020, the protesters reclaimed control of the Ala-Too Square in central Bishkek. They also managed to seize the White House and Supreme Council buildings nearby, throwing paper from windows and setting them on fire, also entering the President's offices. A protestor died and 590 others were injured. Following the protests, the electoral authorities in the country annulled the results of the parliamentary elections. Central Election Commission member Gulnara Jurabaeva also revealed the commission was considering self-dissolution.

In the meantime, opposition groups claimed to be in power after seizing government buildings in the capital, and several provincial governors reportedly resigned. President Jeenbekov said that he faced a coup d'état, and told the BBC that he was "ready to give the responsibility to strong leaders".

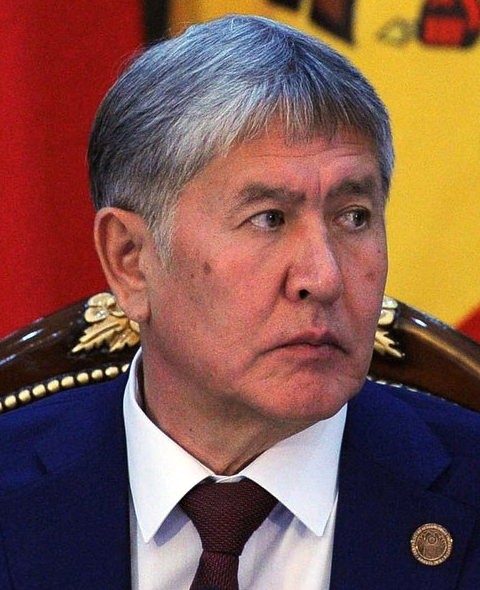
Former president Atambayev was rearrested on charges of inciting unrest

Protestors freed former president Almazbek Atambayev and opposition politician Sadyr Japarov from prison. Likely due to pressure from the protests, Prime Minister Kubatbek Boronov resigned, citing parliamentary deputy Myktybek Abdyldayev as the new speaker.

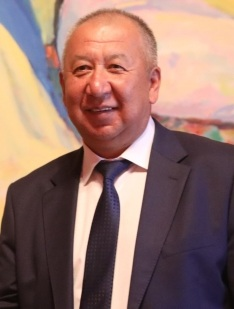
Prime Minister Boronov resigned after pressure from protesters

=== 7 October ===
Opposition parties were unsuccessful at forming a new government on Wednesday, 7 October. Following the resignation of Prime Minister Boronov, former lawmaker Japarov was appointed to replace him. The opposition parties rejected Japarov's legitimacy and put forward their own candidate for prime minister, Tilek Toktogaziyev. Japarov claimed that he was already the "legitimate prime minister" and that he was appointed by "the parliament's majority." Boronov's resignation, however, had yet to be confirmed by President Jeenbekov, and government websites continued to list him as the prime minister on 7 October.

Crowds gathered to protest the nomination of Japarov and demand the resignation of Jeenbekov. According to the Ministry of Healthcare, no fewer than 768 people injured during the protests had been treated by the country's hospitals and clinics as of Wednesday morning. According to Reuters, at least three distinct groups were attempting to claim leadership.

Meanwhile, Kyrgyz parliamentarians launched impeachment procedures against Jeenbekov, according to a parliamentarian from opposition party Ata-Meken, Kanybek Imanaliev.

=== 9 October ===
Jeenbekov declared a state of emergency, ordering troops to deploy in Bishkek. The declaration imposed a 12-hour curfew until 21 October. Gunfire was heard during violent clashes in the capital that broke out after Jeenbekov's declaration. Jeenbekov formally accepted Boronov's resignation.

=== 10 October ===
Kyrgyzstani special forces detained former president Atambayev in a raid on his compound. Former Member of Parliament Japarov, who was freed from prison on 5 October by protesters, was nominated as interim prime minister by the parliament.

=== 12 October ===
A second state of emergency was declared by Jeenbekov in Bishkek from 12 to 19 October. Opposition parties announced their intentions to oust him; Jeenbekov stated that he would consider resigning, but only after the political crisis was resolved. Another curfew was put in place, in effect from 10 pm to 5 am. Convoys of troops from the Kyrgyz military were sent into the capital to control the situation.

=== 13 October ===
Kanatbek Isaev was elected as the new Speaker of the Supreme Council, as there were no other candidates seeking the position. Parliament endorsed Jeenbekov's second state of emergency declaration, after previously rejecting the first. President Jeenbekov formally rejected the nomination of Japarov to the position of prime minister.

=== 15 October ===
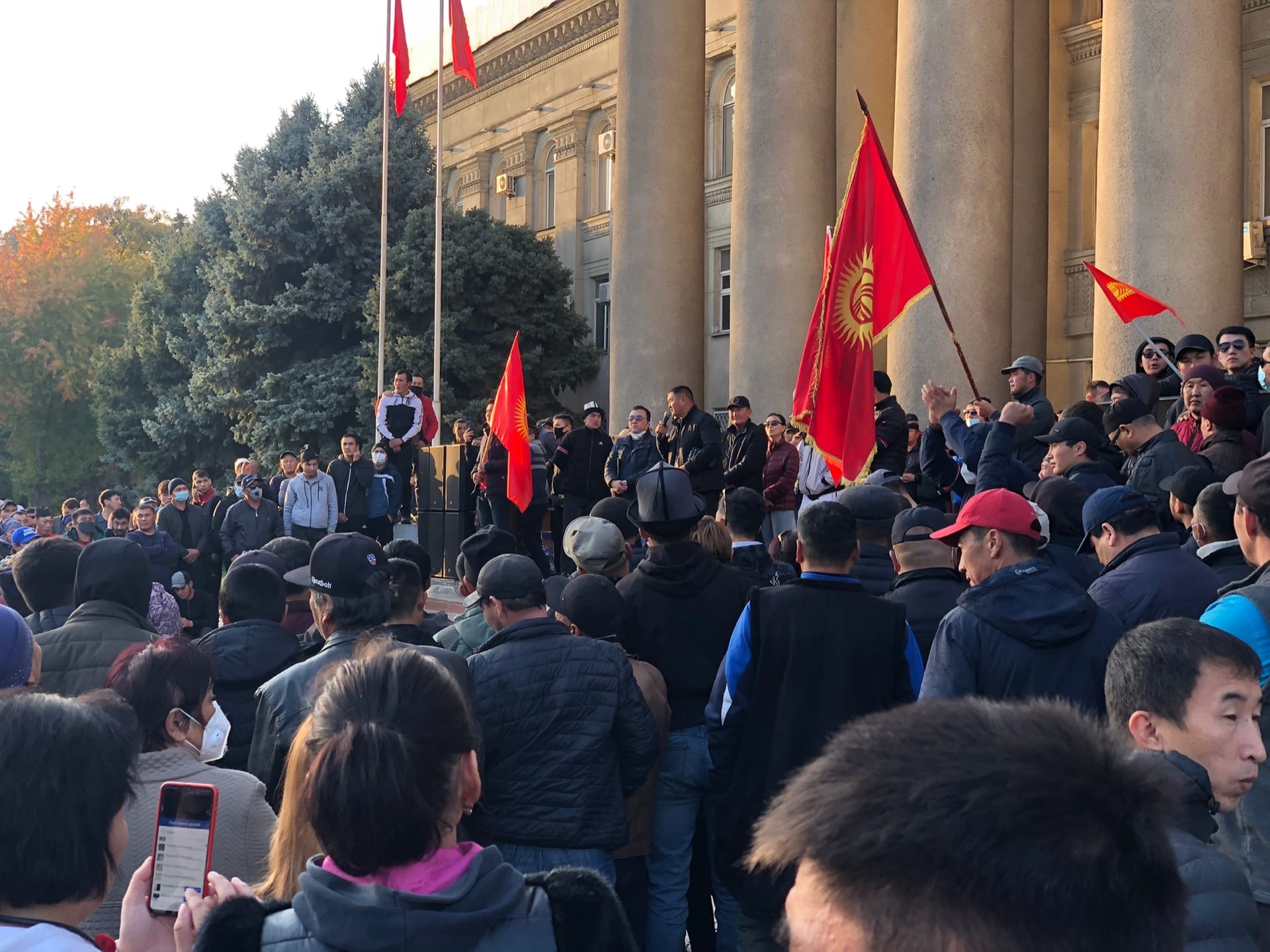
Supporters of Sadyr Japarov at the old square on 14 October 2020

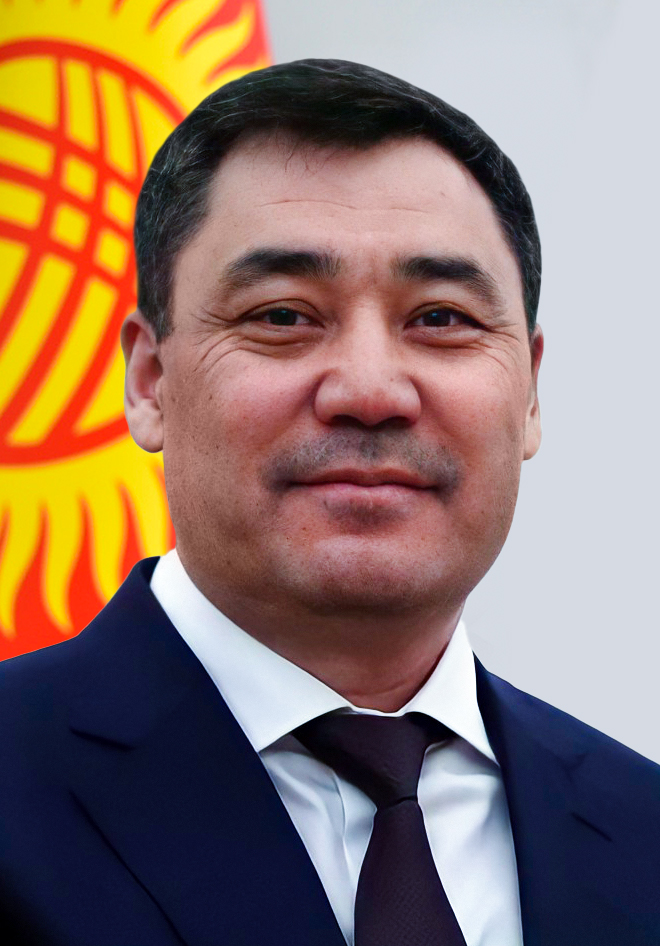
Japarov was sworn-in as the new president, ending the protests. Prior to this, he was arrested for encouraging protesters to topple Jeenbekov.

Jeenbekov resigned as President of Kyrgyzstan in an attempt to end the unrest, while stating that he "calls on Japarov and the other politicians to withdraw their supporters out of the capital of the nation and to return the people of Bishkek to peaceful lives". Japarov declared himself acting president. Despite the Constitution stating that the speaker of the Supreme Council should succeed the president, Isaev refused to assume office, resulting in Japarov becoming acting president.

== Reactions ==
=== China ===
On 7 October, Chinese Foreign Ministry spokeswoman Hua Chunying said, "as a friendly neighbor and comprehensive strategic partner, China sincerely hopes that all parties in Kyrgyzstan can resolve the issue according to law through dialogue and consultation, and push for stability in Kyrgyzstan as soon as possible."

=== Russia ===
On 7 October, Russian president Vladimir Putin expressed that Russia is concerned by the political unrest taking place in Kyrgyzstan and hoped for a swift return to stability for the former Soviet state. Russia also gave assurances it was in touch with all sides in the conflict and hoped that the democratic process would be restored. On 8 October, Russian spokesman Dmitry Peskov said "the situation looks like a mess and chaos", and Russia was obliged by a security treaty to prevent a total breakdown in the country.

=== European Union ===
The European Union called on all political forces in the country to act within the framework of the constitution and to settle their disagreements peacefully.

=== United States ===
The U.S. Embassy in Bishkek expressed support for Jeenbekov, stating on 13 October that "the United States supports the efforts of President Jeenbekov, political leaders, civil society, and legal scholars to return the political life of the country to a constitutional order. It is clear that one of the obstacles towards democratic progress is the attempt by organized crime groups to exert influence over politics and elections."

== See also ==
- 2013 Kyrgyzstani protests
- 2020s in politics
- List of protests in the 21st century
- 2021 Kyrgyz presidential election
- 2021 Kyrgyz parliamentary election
