= Law enforcement in Kyrgyzstan =

Law enforcement in the Kyrgyz Republic is primarily the responsibility of the Ministry of Internal Affairs. The ministry commands the police force, also known locally as militsiya, directly and thus policemen carry the insignia of the ministry (ИИМ). This structure of law enforcement is similar to its predecessors and many other post-Soviet states. The ministry is subdivided into numerous departments that tackle the different aspects of law enforcement in the Kyrgyz Republic and is also supported simultaneously by other governmental agencies. The police is contactable via the emergency hotline number 102.

== History ==
Before Kyrgyzstan's independence, the main law enforcement agencies in the Kirghiz Soviet Socialist Republic were the KGB's Kirghiz branch and the Committee for State Security of the Kyrgyz Soviet Socialist Republic. Both were however dissolved after the independence of Kyrgyzstan, with the then newly formed Ministry of Internal Affairs taking over the responsibilities. Since its independence, the republic has been rocked by several revolutions, terror incidents and international cross border standoffs which has put pressure on the law enforcement agencies in maintaining public security as well as law and order in the absence of proper governance. In addition, highly institutionalised corruption and traditional practices such as Ala kachuu (bride kidnapping) has further exacerbated the problems and have caused mounting criticisms by the public on the republic's law enforcement agencies, to which years of newly elected government have tried but with limited success in attempting to reform the law enforcement agencies and its institutions. For example, in recent times, the government has been reviewing the changing of the name of the force from militsiya (Милиция) to police (Полиция), so as to encourage an increase in police interaction with the general public and consequently gain the public's confidence in the force.

Nonetheless, the republic has with its Soviet predecessor set aside days to celebrate the contributions of law enforcement personnel, past and present. The first of November is set aside as the professional Day of Police which also commemorates the founding of the predecessor of the current Kyrgyz police in 1924. Other dates set aside include the 28 of May for Border Guard Day.

== Local agencies ==
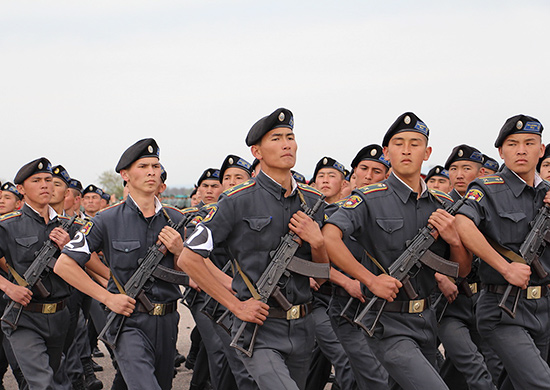
Troops of the Kyrgyz internal ministry during a rehearsal for a Victory Day parade in Bishkek

There are several agencies like the Main Directorate for Road Traffic Safety (traffic police), Service for Combating Drug Trafficking (counter narcotics force) and Specialised State Security Service (counter-terrorism force) that are departments under the direct command of the Ministry of Internal Affairs. Whilst other agencies work separately but alongside the internal ministry, and are known as State Committees or Public Service Departments. Several of these agencies are:

State Committee

- State Committee for National Security, responsible for intelligence on counter terrorism and organised crime

Public Service Departments

- State Border Guard Service, responsible for border security and immigration
- State Customs Service, responsible for customs and excise
- State Forensic Experts Service, responsible for forensics
- State Penitentiary Service, responsible for the upkeep of prisons
- State Service for Combating Economic Crimes, responsible for tackling economic crimes

== International agencies ==
The Ministry of Internal Affairs has forged relationships with several international policing organisations, these include Interpol and the United Nations Office on Drugs and Crime. These organisations have assisted and likewise received assistance from the republic in tackling international crimes related to drug trafficking and organised crime. Several international agencies have also been invited by the Kyrgyz Republic in helping to reform and improve the efficiency of the police, although they do not have the right to exercise law enforcement powers. An example would be the Organization for Security and Co-operation in Europe which has developed the Community Security Initiative programme.

== See also ==
- Police reform in Kyrgyzstan
- Ministry of Internal Affairs
- State Committee for National Security (Kyrgyzstan)
- Ministry of Emergency Situations (Kyrgyzstan)
