= Television in Kyrgyzstan =

Television was introduced in the Kirghiz SSR in 1958; KTR launched that year and broadcast in Russian. The Kirghiz SSR became independent Kyrgyzstan in 1991.

== History ==
The Kyrgyz SSR started its own television broadcasts in December 1958, after the completion of construction for a television twoer and studio at the Drezhensky street in Frunze (the current Bishkek). Construction work on the 196 meter tower began in 1956 and after its conclusion it became one of the tallest buildings of the city. In its initial phase, Kyrgyz Television broadcast four hours a week. The emergence and development of television in the Kyrgyz SSR was facilitated by television directors J. Moldobaev, D. Varivada, T. Uraliev, editors Sh Smatov, D. Abramova, A. Cheremushkina, M. Ronkin, camera operators G. Kim, A. .Kim, announcers S. Zhunushalieva, T. Bakieva (Dzhamanbaeva), L. Tulmenko, R. Ryskeldinova and G. Subbotin.

The first president of the Radio and Television Committee, Rabiya Menseyitova, in one of the internal documents in 1960, appointed the lack of qualified personnel for television broadcasts and the lack of feedback from viewers. A key component of broadcasts in the 1960s was the topic of agriculture. Development of the topic was facilitated by the creation of a separate team led by K. Chukuldukov.

To distribute television signals, repeater stations of varying reach were installed at the top of the Tien Shan and Alai mountains. Under the management of Konstantin Ananyev in the infrastructure segment, low-power television transmitters were installed. In 1980, 86 low-power television repeaters were operational in Kyrgyzstan, the majority of which were handmade. This enabled access to television signals to more than 95% of the population.

In the 1970s, daily television broadcasts in Kyrgyzstan lasted almost six hours a day, in both Kyrgyz and Russian languages. From 1964 to 1985, the president of the Radio and Television Committee of the Council of Ministers of the Kyrgyz SSR was Asanbek Tokombaev.

According to the decree of the President of Kyrgyzstan, Askar Akaev, dated 21 February 1991, the State Radio and Television Committee was abolished and the State Radio and Television Broadcasting Company of the Republic of Kyrgyzstan was formed. In March 1998, the National Television and Radio Company was created in its base. The next reform happened in 2007, when the corporation became the National Television and Radio Broadcasting Corporation (NTRC). After the 2010 revolution, the State Radio and Television Company became the Public Radio and Television Company, which was managed by the Public Supervision Council. In 2022, KTRK became the UTRK (National Television and Radio Corporation) and the public fiscal council was liquidated.

The first independent television company to appear in Kyrgyzstan was Pyramid. Later, new stations followed, Koort, Vosst, Asman-TV, NBT (Independent Bishkek Television) in the capital, and in the city of Osh, Mezon-TV, Keremet and Osh-TV. After the events of the Tulip Revolution, Kanal 5, Eho Manas and ElTR appeared. Piramida became an entertainment channel. As of 2008, state channels KTR and ElTR were still touted as "his master's voice".

== List of channels ==
This is a list of television channels that broadcast in Kyrgyzstan.

=== State-owned ===
Name	Owner	Established
KTRK	Kyrgyz Television (state-owned)	1958
Madaniyat Taryh Til (Cultural Channel)	Kyrgyz Television (state-owned)	Unknown
Muzyka	Kyrgyz Television (state-owned)	2012
Balastan	Kyrgyz Television (state-owned)	2013
Sport (full HD)	Kyrgyz Television (state-owned)	2015 (16)
Ala Too 24 (News Channel)	Kyrgyz Television (state-owned)	2016

=== Private ===
Name	Owner	Established	
ЭЛТР	?	December 2005	
5 Kanal	?	2006/12/16–2023	
7 TV HD	?	?	
Aprel TV HD	?	ended 2019	
Kanal 7	?	?	
KOORT	?	1996-2006	
Kyrgyzstan tv	?	?	
Life tv HD	?	?	
НБТ (NBT)	?	1996	
New tv HD	?	?	
Next tv	?	?	
(NTV Kyrgyzstan) НТС	Gazprom Media	?	
НТС СПОРТ HD	Gazprom Media	?	ended 2020
Nur tv HD	?	?	
Nomad TV	?	November 2025	
ON1	?	?	
Ren TV Kyrgyzstan	?	?	
RTL Kyrgyz	RTL	2016	
Sentyabr TV HD	?	2016-2017	
Telcanal YA	?	?	
TV24	?	2018	
K Channel	?	2018	

Regional

Name	Owner	Established
Piramida	?	1991-05-05
OshTV	?	1991
Osh Pirm TV	?	?
Osh-3000	?	1999-2005
Ecological Youth TV(EYTV)	?	
Bishkek TV	?	?
TV1.KG Bishkek city	?	?
TV 2.KG Кинофильмы	?	?
TV3.KG Junior	?	?
Mezon TV	?	?
STV	Sary-Özön	?

== See also ==
- Television in the Soviet Union
- Media of Kyrgyzstan
