= Police reform in Kyrgyzstan =

Package of measures

Police reform in the Kyrgyz Republic refers to the package of measures intended to improve the work of the Ministry of Internal Affairs of the Kyrgyz Republic, which commands the police force, so as to increase the public's level of trust in the police and strengthen its interaction with the institutions of civil society, amongst other improvements.

Attempts at police reform were initiated in Kyrgyzstan in 1998, 2005 and 2012. The current reform program was launched by the government on April 30, 2013.

== Reformation process ==
=== Early attempts ===
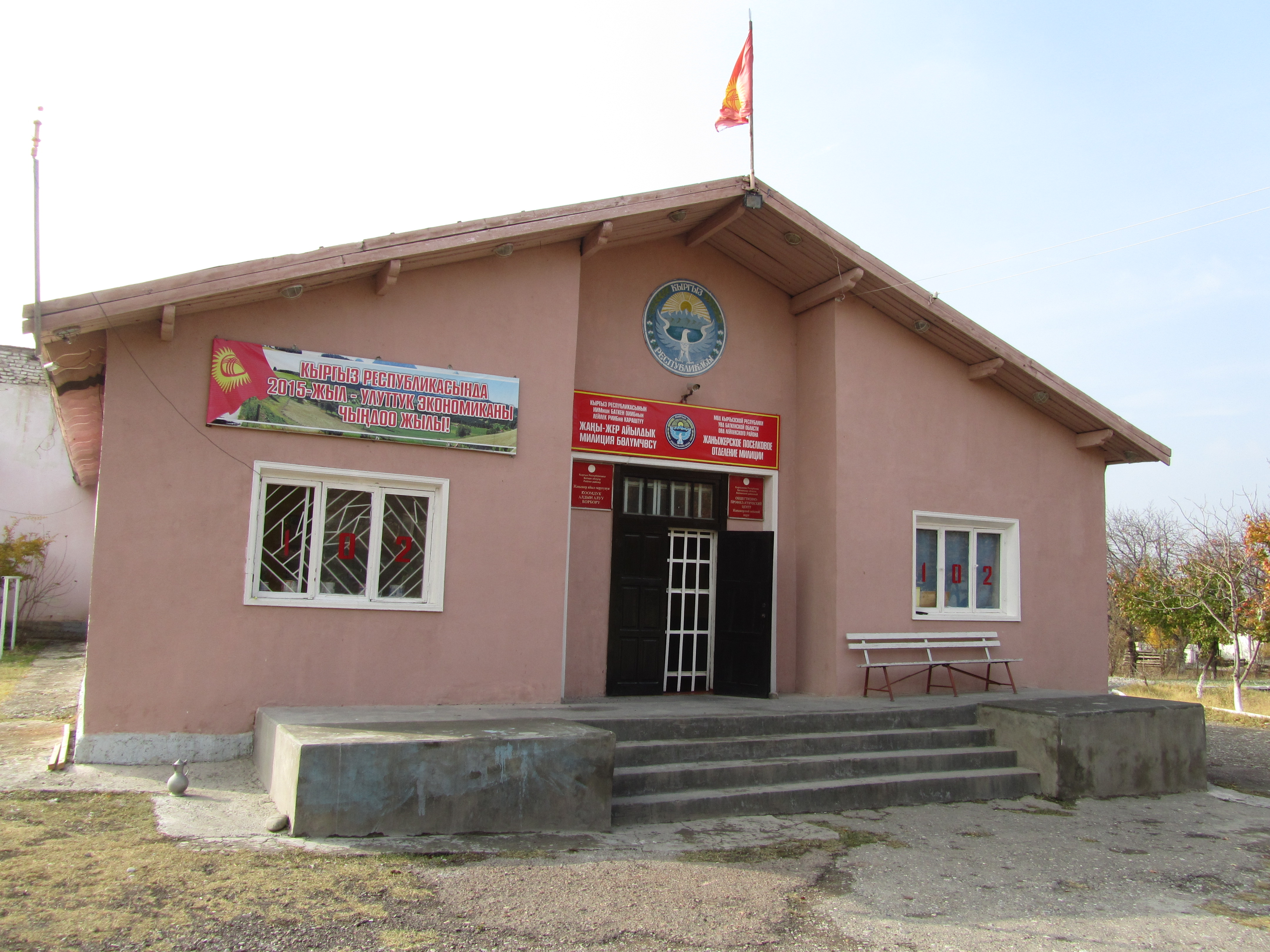
Village police station in the Kyrgyz Republic

On 23 July 1998, the Kyrgyz government approved Resolution #490, “The Concept of Development of the Ministry of Internal Affairs (MIA) of the Kyrgyz Republic”. This resolution was the official position of the internal ministry on the main trends and principles of improvement of the operational and service activity during the transition period. This concept was established to provide the integrated approach to the development of internal affairs for the then current period (until the end of 1998), the short term (till 2000) and long term (till 2003) prospects. Additionally, due to administrative reforms during the period from 1999 to 2005 the quantity of the MIA staff was reduced by 50% due to the optimization of the organizational and regular structure. A number of services were also reorganized in the department.

On 18 March 2005, in a second round of reforms, “The Concept of Reforming the Bodies of Internal Affairs of the Kyrgyz Republic for the period till 2010” was approved by the Decree of the President # 76. Subsequently, in 2008 “The Program on the Internal Affairs Reform for 2008 — 2010” was approved by the order of the MIA dated March 7 and April 16. In the framework of that reform process, the structural and functional transformation of the MIA system was carried out with consideration of the democratic principles and existing real threats for the safety of the society and state. "Public - Preventive Centers" were initiated and established all over the country on the village administration level in compliance with the Order of the MIA #162 “On implementation of the Law on crime prevention in the Kyrgyz Republic” dated February 28, 2008, and their experiences were later extended.

According to experts, the reforms of 1998 and 2005 were largely considered as a failure as they didn't bring notable results.

=== Later attempts ===
In 2011, the interdepartmental commission on police reform was established to develop ideas for the reformation of MIA for the forthcoming years. The commission consisted of representatives of the government, deputies of the Jogorky Kenesh (parliament) and experts.

Simultaneously, a group of civil activists started working on the alternative concept of police reform. They initiated a collection of reform ideas from the population, to which these ideas later became the cornerstones of “The Alternative Concept on Police Reform (Alternative Concept)”. On February 20, 2012, that group of activists formed a network known as Civic union “For Reforms and Result” that later included 24 public organizations. From October to November 2012, the activists then began a petition campaign, which included collecting citizens’ signatures in the country in support of the "Alternative Concept". More than 10 thousand signatures were later collected and submitted to the deputies of Jogorku Kenesh, President and the Prime minister of Kyrgyzstan in support of the "Alternative Concept". On February 13, 2013, the then Prime Minister of Kyrgyzstan, Jantoro Satybaldiyev, held a working meeting with participation from public civil societies, during which he noted that suggestions of the Civil Union "For Reforms and Result" would be considered in the official draft of the concept on Police Reform.

This was then followed by the government adopting the “Measures on police reform” resolution on April 30, 2013. In this resolution further steps of police reform were defined. Several of these measures for reforming the bodies of the internal affairs ministry, which came from suggestions from the "Alternative Concept", included: hiring of the police officers on competitive basis, introduction of retraining courses in the Academia of the MIA for the newly arriving officers for service in the bodies of internal affairs, change of approaches to interaction of police and population, establishment of the joint body to coordinate and administrate the police reform, change of evaluation criteria of the police taking into account the public opinion, amongst other suggestions.

Subsequently, in September 2013, the Council for Reforming and Developing the System of a Law and Order was formed within the Government of the Kyrgyz Republic, that was chaired by the Vice-Prime Minister on Issues of Defense, Safety and Borders. Eleven subsections were formed in the council to examine the declared trends of the reform in detail and submit the mechanisms of transformations to the joint body for discussion. Representatives of civil society also took part in the meetings and works of the council.

=== Reform nowadays ===
In 2017, further reforms continue to take place within the ministry. The entire of the Kyrgyz traffic police (Main Patrol Police Directorate) was retrenched and a new department (Main Directorate for Road Traffic Safety) was established in its place. This move was likely to have been an attempt to rid highly institutionalised corruption within the department which have led to cases of accidents happening in three to four days after drivers had received their licences because these licences were apparently bought from the department. The new department also aims to create and have a single standardised test centre for obtaining a driver's licence. In addition, there are also plans for more traffic infrastructures such as cameras to be installed, as only one at Kudaibergen car market in Bishkek has been installed so far. Billed drafts to reconstruct and renovate roads more frequently as part of timely road maintenance and also schemes to reward citizens who report traffic violators are also ambitiously put on the pipelines. Additionally in January 2018, as part of reform efforts, Kyrgyz traffic policemen received new uniforms and traffic police car liveries. A new traffic police website is also expected to be launched in the near future, so as to allow drivers to find statistics, rules and fine amounts as well as get to know the contact details of the regional traffic police units. In August 2018, the traffic police department also established an English hotline for tourists in the run up to the World Nomad Games.

As part of police reforms, the issue of changing the local name of the police from militsiya (Милиция) to police (Полиция) so as to not be like the soviet style militsiya which was known for its focus on process and statistics, but instead foster cooperation with the public, was also mulled over by the government. The changing of the name of force would however require money, to which changes have to be made systematically because of apparent public frustration with the police doing what appears to them as an unnecessary name change as seen through opinion polls by local media.

== International assistance ==
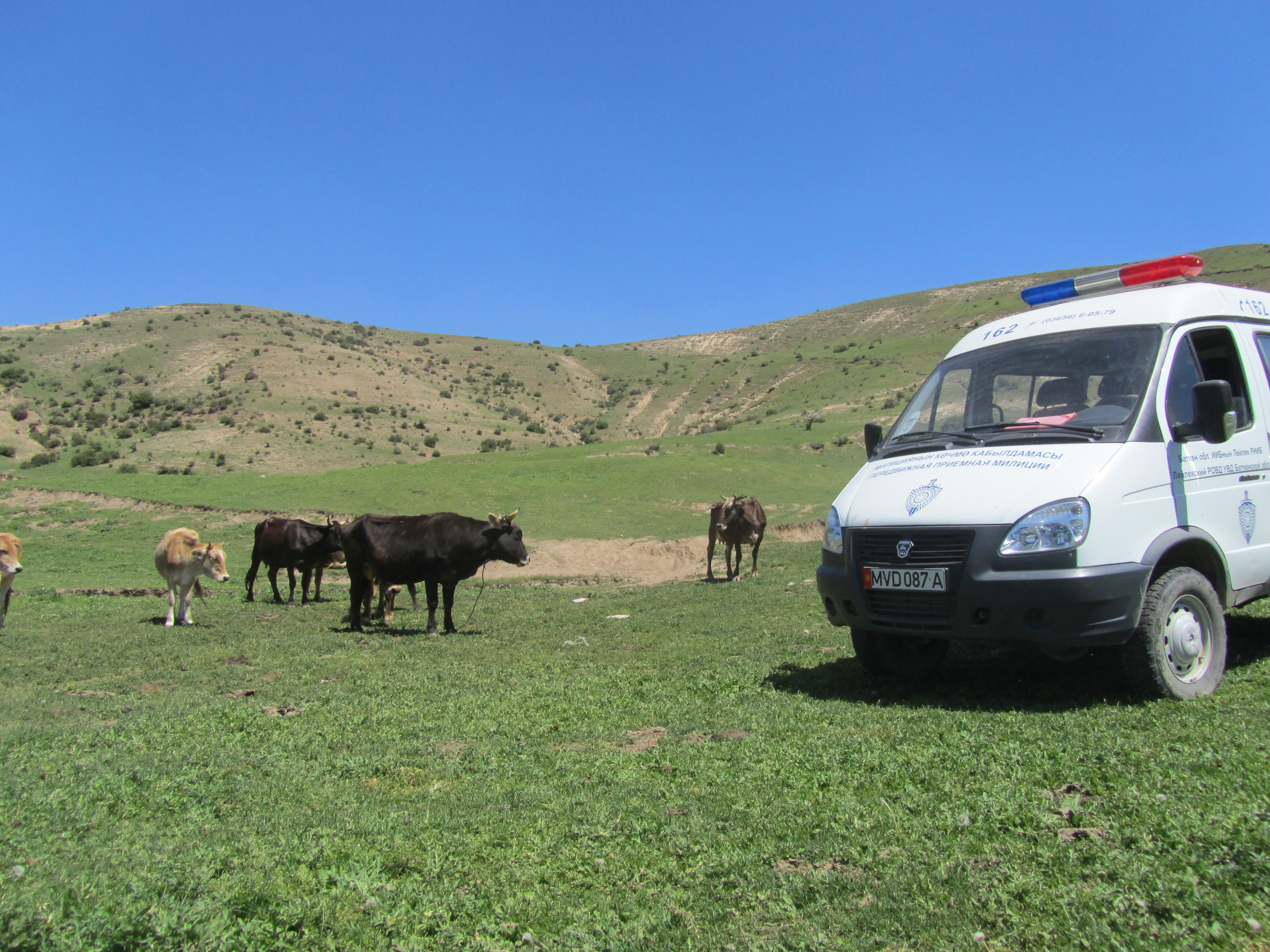
Mobile police reception vehicles

Several international organisations have been invited by the Kyrgyz Republic in helping to reform and improve the efficiency of the police. The Organization for Security and Co-operation in Europe has developed the Community Security Initiative programme, which aims to improve police presence in the republic's countryside following violent inter-ethnic clashes. This program saw many mobile police reception vehicles, infrastructures and training skills being imparted to the local police by various experts from many different countries.

== Monitoring the reform ==
Throughout the course of transformation of the police of the Kyrgyz Republic, there have been multiple groups, which include civil activists, in all regions of the republic that have been monitoring the process. Early results of the monitoring efforts were published by the Civic union "For Reforms and Result" in March 2014 and the document contained recommendations for the authorities to strengthen some components of the police reform. Another local agency involved include the Ombudsman (Омбудсмен), which is a watchdog group that monitors the other various government ministries too and the actions taken by these ministries. Amnesty International and Human Rights Watch are other international organisations that frequently monitor the progress of the reforms of the police in the republic and advocate for the necessary changes.

== See also ==
- Corruption in Kyrgyzstan
- Law enforcement in Kyrgyzstan
