= State Penitentiary Service (Kyrgyzstan) =

- Жазаларды Аткаруу Мамлекеттик Кызматы; Zhazalardeu Atkaruu Mamlekettik Keuzmateu; Государственная Служба Исполнения Наказаний

Public Service overview
- Formed: October 22, 2009
- Preceding agencies: Ministry of Internal Affairs; Ministry of Justice
- Headquarters: 106 Ibraimov Street, Bishkek, 720021, Kyrgyz Republic
- Minister responsible: Colonel Talaybek Japarov
- Website: http://www.gsin.gov.kg

The State Penitentiary Service of the Kyrgyz Republic is a Public Service department of the government of the Kyrgyz Republic that is in charge of the penitentiary institutions and systems of the republic. It is currently not under the jurisdiction of any ministries, although it works closely with the Ministry of Internal Affairs and Ministry of Justice to safeguard the country. The abbreviation GSIN, which is derived from its Russian name, is also used in conjunction, and is not to be confused with Russia's Federal Penitentiary Service (FSIN).

== History ==
The State Penitentiary Service of the Kyrgyz Republic has its beginnings in 1918, when the People's Commissariat for Justice of the Turkestan Republic approved a provision to establish three prisons and two workhouses in the region. In 1920, the first Soviet concentration camp in Kirghiz SSR was established and several more were later opened during Stalin's rule of the Soviet Union. Execution sites like those in Chong-Tash also appeared during that time to suppress dissidents. During the Great Patriotic War, convicts and prisoners-of-war were transferred to these concentration camps. After the war from 1954 to 1969, the system was brought under the charge of the General Directorate of the Places of Detention under the Ministry of Public Order and Protection. Towards the end of the Soviet Union in 1989 to 1990, major protests broke out across prisons nationwide and in the Kirghiz SSR changes were demanded to improve the welfare of prisoners. Violence, hunger strikes and suicide broke out when such demands were not met. In one major incident on the 14 and 15 of September 1989, prison colony No.19 near the village of Zhany-Zher, Sokuluk District, broke out into a violent prison uprising that led to a major state of emergency. The incident eventually ended with three dead and infrastructure damages amounting to at least one million roubles. Upon the republic's independence in 1991, the department was brought under the command of the Ministry of Internal Affairs. In 2002, the Ministry of Justice took over the command of the department as well as large amounts of personnel from the former. This was done to provide and ensure a more humane environment within prisons in line with international practice. On 22 October 2009, by Presidential Decree, the State Penitentiary Service was established as an independent department under the Kyrgyz Government to oversee the penitentiary institutions and personnel. This was later approved by a Government Decree on the 18 December the same year. The future construction of prison complexes in Batken and Talas Oblast, as well as upgrades to existing infrastructure are currently being planned to accommodate to the prison numbers.

== Responsibilities ==
The responsibilities of the penitentiary service are to:

1. Ensure the execution and serving of sentences and other measures of criminal law in accordance with the legislation
2. Ensure the proper detention of persons detained on suspicion, charged with committing crimes, and prisoners
3. Ensure the protection of the rights, freedoms and legitimate interests of convicts and prisoners
4. Ensure the rule of law and legality in the institutions executing punishment in the form of imprisonment and pre-trial penitentiaries, the safety of convicted prisoners and prisoners, as well as employees, military personnel, officials and citizens located in the territories of these institutions
5. Ensure the protection of penitentiary institutions, as well as other units and institutions of the GSIN
6. Ensure the protection and escorting of convicts and prisoners along established escort routes, escorting citizens of the Kyrgyz Republic and stateless persons to the territory of the Kyrgyz Republic, as well as foreign citizens and stateless persons in the event of their extradition
7. Assist law enforcement and other security agencies of the Kyrgyz Republic to ensure public safety and the legal regime during a state of emergency
8. Provide legal and social protection for employees, military and retired GSIN personnel
9. Organize training and retraining of the staff of the GSIN in cooperation with educational institutions of the Kyrgyz Republic and foreign countries

== Structure ==
The penitentiary service is divided into several divisions, that include:

- Main Headquarters
- Department for the Protection of Correctional Institutions & the escort of convicts and persons in custody
- Department of Penitentiary Inspections
- Social Support Bureau
- Medical Service
- Atlantis Rehabilitation Center
- Center for Rehabilitation and Social Adaptation of convicts
- Pension Department
- Sports Society "Semetey, Семетей"
- Educational Center
- Newspaper Department "Umut, Умут"

The penitentiary service is further sub-divided into several units, that include:

- Central Base
- Department for Criminal Executive Inspections
- Department for Enforcement of Sentences and Special Accounting
- Department of Capital Construction and Renovation
- Department of Educational Work
- Department of Logistics
- Dog Center
- Financial and Economic Department
- General Department
- Internal Audit Sector
- Internal Security Service
- International Cooperation Department
- Investigation Department
- Legal Department
- Main Operational Directorate
- Medical Department
- Militarized Fire Protection Sector
- Operational Response Division
- Personnel Management Unit
- Sector for Mobilization Work and Civil Protection
- Security Regime Sector
- Special Unit "Omega"
- State Enterprise "Kelechek, Келечек"
- State-owned Enterprise "PMK, ПМК"

== Outreach ==
=== Local ===
Local community outreach has been initiated by the penitentiary service in the form of selling produce that has been made within the penitentiary institutions as part of job training efforts. Several of these products include bowls, clothes, construction materials, soy milk, and even wheat products like bread and pasta. Local religious organisations from the Islamic and Russian Orthodox Church branches have also been approached to bring religious teachings into these institutes. Furthermore, local third party watchdog group, the Ombudsman (Омбудсмени), have been invited to review and recommend actions to be taken in light of reforms happening in the service.

=== International ===
The penitentiary service has reached out to several international organisations to seek assistance in improving the conditions of its institutions as well as its staff. These include the Organization for Security and Co-operation in Europe (OSCE), United Nations Office on Drugs and Crime (UNODC) as well as several non-governmental organisations like Doctors Without Borders, International Committee of the Red Cross, and Soros Foundation. These organisations have assisted the penitentiary service in numerous ways including providing funds for the upgrading of aging infrastructure, training of its staff, or monitoring as a third party watchdog of the conditions of prisoners held within the institutions.

The Kyrgyz Republic is also a member of the Istanbul Protocol and have abolished the death penalty under the guidance of the international community, although there have been calls from within the republic for the return of capital punishment.

== State Penitentiary Service Day ==
The Day of the Employee of the Penitentiary System of the Kyrgyz Republic also known as the State Penitentiary Service Day, is a professional holiday for employees of the penitentiary service in the Kyrgyz Republic that is celebrated annually on the 12 of August. It was established in 2003 by a governmental decree to acknowledge the efforts of penitentiary service personnel in safeguarding the nation. Traditionally, concerts and meetings are held to thank the staff, while state and departmental awards are also given out.

== Incidents ==
- On 20 October 2005, during a period of prison unrest, convicts killed four prison officials which included the head of the Main Department for the Execution of Punishments during a visit. This incident came during a time when prison conditions were deteriorating due to acute shortages in the funding of prisons as well as alleged torture of prisoners.
- On 22 October 2015, Kyrgyz police killed a suspected Islamist militant that had escaped from prison during a shootout, which saw the death of one policeman and two civilians too. The militant had escaped from prison together with eight other detainees and convicts after killing three prison guards. This mirrored increasing calls for concern that more militants might have entered the country at the wake of the United States invasion of Afghanistan in 2001 as well as the collapse of the Islamic State around 2015, that eventually led to sweeping arrests and convictions of suspected terrorists which have alarmed human rights group.

== See also ==
- Capital punishment in Kyrgyzstan
- Law enforcement in Kyrgyzstan
