= Ministry of Emergency Situations (Kyrgyzstan) =

Government ministry of Kyrgyzstan

- Өзгөчө кырдаалдар министрлиги
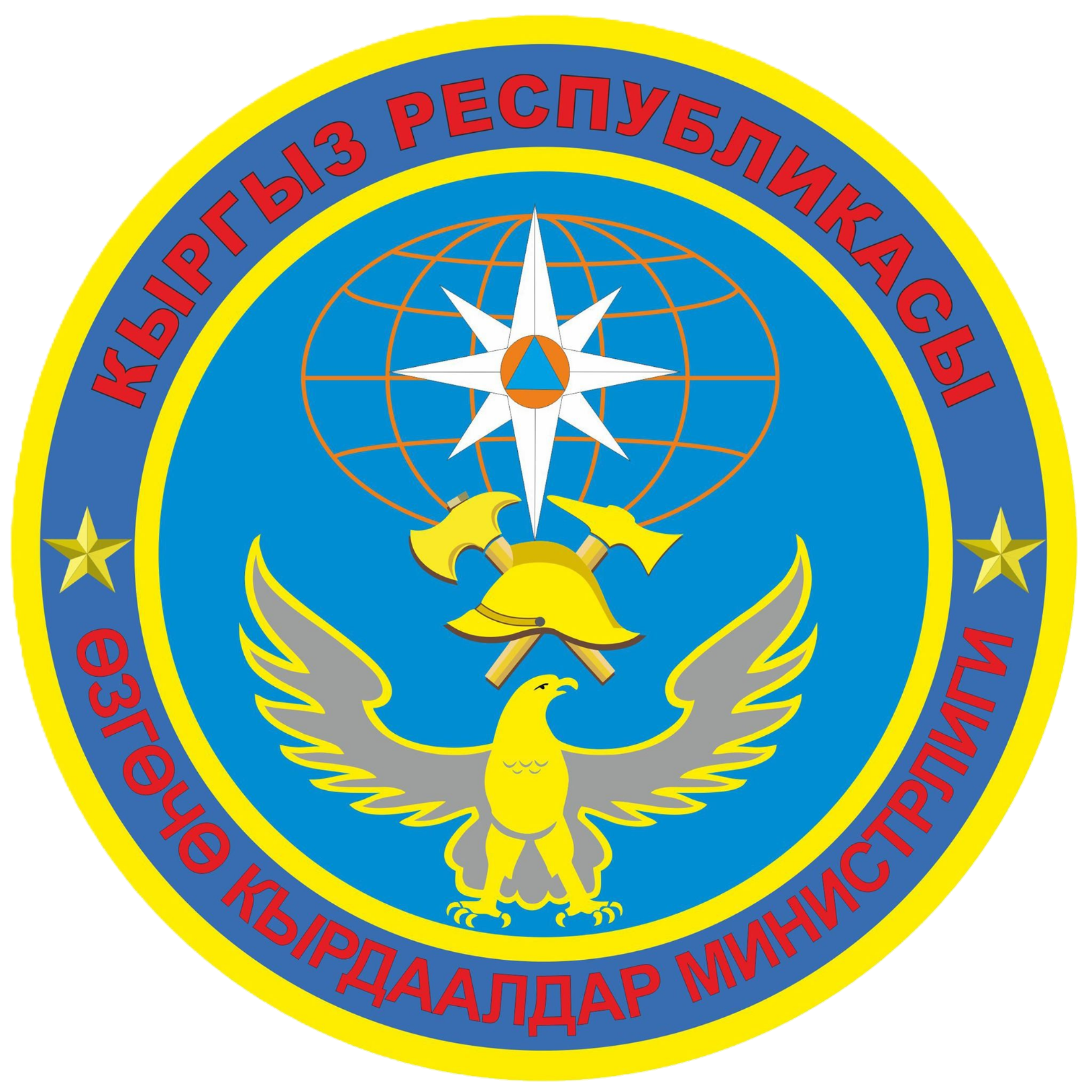

Emergency service overview
- Formed: July 1, 1991
- Jurisdiction: Government of Kyrgyzstan
- Headquarters: Bishkek
- Minister responsible: Boobek Ajikeev, Minister of Emergency Situations
- Emergency service executive: Azamat Mambetov, State Secretary
- Website: mes.kg/en/

The Ministry of Emergency Situations of Kyrgyzstan (Kyrgyz: Кыргыз Республикасынын Өзгөчө кырдаалдар министрлиги, romanized: Kyrgyz Respublikasynyn Özgöchö kyrdaaldar ministrligi, Russian: Министерство по чрезвычайным ситуациям Кыргызстана, romanized: Ministerstvo po chrezvychaynym situatsiyam Kyrgyzstana) is a special ministry in Kyrgyzstan dedicated to the response of natural disasters such as earthquakes or landslides or serious accidents. The current emergencies minister is Boobek Ajikeev.

== History ==
On July 1, 1991 the Council of Ministers of the Kyrgyz SSR established the State Commission for Emergency Situations of the Kyrgyz Republic based on the resolution of the establishment of a state all-union system for preventing emergency situations and emergency response by the Council of Ministers of the USSR. On January 6, 1992 the State Commission for Emergency Situations of the Kyrgyz Republic was reorganized into the modern Ministry of Emergency Situations of Kyrgyzstan. Between 1999 and 2005, during the process of Police reform in the Ministry of Internal Affairs, the State Fire Service was transferred to the command of the Emergency Situations Ministry. On October 6, 2008 the ministry was called upon to take action after the 2008 Kyrgyzstan earthquake.

== Management ==
- Executive leadership
  - President – Commander-in-Chief of the Armed Forces of the Kyrgyz Republic
  - Prime Minister – Head of the Civil Defense
  - Governors – Heads of Oblast Civil Protection
  - Mayors – Heads of Civil Protection Systems (CPS)
- Ministry leadership
  - Minister of Emergency Situations – Deputy Chairman of the Civil Protection Interdepartmental Commission
  - State Secretary
  - Deputy Minister
  - Deputy Minister
  - Deputy Minister
  - Adviser to the Minister of Emergency Situations

== Structure ==
The ministry has the following structure:

- Regional departments
  - Bishkek City Department
  - Osh City Department
  - Department for Osh Region
  - Department for Jalal-Abad Region
  - Department for Batken Region
  - Department for Chüy Region
  - Department for Naryn Region
- Department for Monitoring and Forecasting
- Department for the Elimination of Consequences
- Regional Department of the Elimination of Consequences
- Selvodzashita (state enterprise)
- Spaspromservice (state enterprise)
- Aviation Enterprise
- Emergency Response Centers (Northern and Southern)
- Mechanized Center for Emergency Response
- Diving Service
- Center for Rescuers Training
- Firefighting Service
- Agency for Tailings
- Hydrometerlogical Agency
- Population Training Center
- Center for Preparation and Retaining of Civil Defense Specialists

== Cooperation ==
Since 2011, the Ministry of Emergency Situations has been cooperating with the International Civil Defence Organization (ICDO). In April 2015, Minister Boronov was elected as a Vice-President of the ICDO. In August 2018, the ministry received 22 new vehicles from the Japanese government, allowing the rescue services to render assistance at a high level on time.

== List of ministers ==
- Kamchybek Tashiev (2007–15 December 2009)
- Bakyt Torobayev (15 December 2009 – 2010)
- Kubatbek Boronov (24 December 2011 – 20 April 2018)
- Nurbolot Mirzahmedov (20 April 2018 – 23 January 2020)
- Zamirbek Askarov (6 February-15 October 2020)
- Boobek Ajikeev (since 14 October 2020)

== See also ==
- Government of Kyrgyzstan
- Ministry of Emergency Situations (disambiguation)
