= Ministry of Internal Affairs (Kyrgyzstan) =

Government ministry of Kyrgyzstan

Ministry of Internal Affairs of the Kyrgyz Republic
- Кыргыз Республикасынын Ички иштер министрлиги Министерство внутренних дел Киргизской Республики
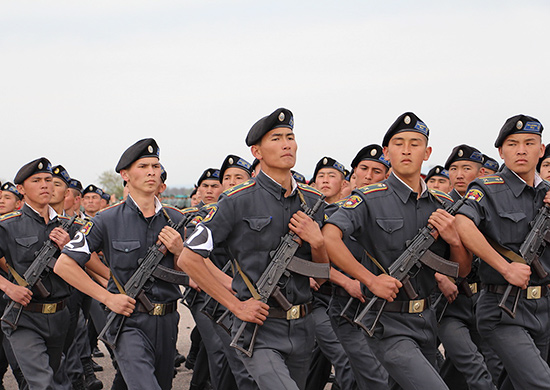
- Kyrgyz Internal Troops during a rehearsal for a Victory Day parade in Bishkek in 2015.

Agency overview
- Formed: 1 November 1924; 101 years ago (Day of the Police of Kyrgyzstan)
- Jurisdiction: Government of Kyrgyzstan
- Headquarters: Bishkek, Kyrgyzstan
- Minister responsible: Ulan Niyazbekov, Minister of Internal Affairs
- Parent department: Ministry of Internal Affairs of the Kyrgyz SSR

The Ministry of Internal Affairs of Kyrgyzstan (Kyrgyz: Кыргыз Республикасынын Ички иштер министрлиги, ИИМ, Russian: Министерство внутренних дел Киргизской Республики, МВД) is the government interior ministry of Kyrgyzstan, responsible for law enforcement in Kyrgyzstan mainly through the Police. The organization also commands the Internal Troops and administers the Academy of the Ministry of Internal Affairs of Kyrgyzstan. The Ministry of Internal Affairs conducts daily monitoring on the internet to reveal any evidence of prohibited materials such as propaganda or signs of religious extremism and/or violence.

== History ==
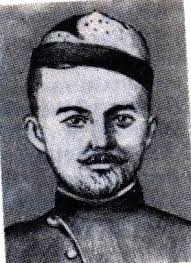
Baltykhodja Sultanov, the founder of the Police of the Osh Oblast of the Kyrgyz SSR.

On 21 October 1924, the Central Executive Committee of Kara-Kirghiz Autonomous Oblast created a Revolutionary Committee headed by Imanali Aidarbekov as a police force for the oblast. On 1 November, the committee began to function as a police force. This day is considered to be the birthday of the police of the Kyrgyz Republic. In 1960, the Ministry of Internal Affairs of the USSR was established, with interior ministries also being founded in the USSR's republics, including Kyrgyzstan. On 17 December 1968, the Ministry of Environmental Protection of the Kirghiz SSR was renamed into the Ministry of Internal Affairs of the Kirghiz SSR. On 19 May 1969, the Frunze Special Secondary School of the Militsiya of the MVD was opened with the purpose of training civilian youth for service in the Frunze city police.

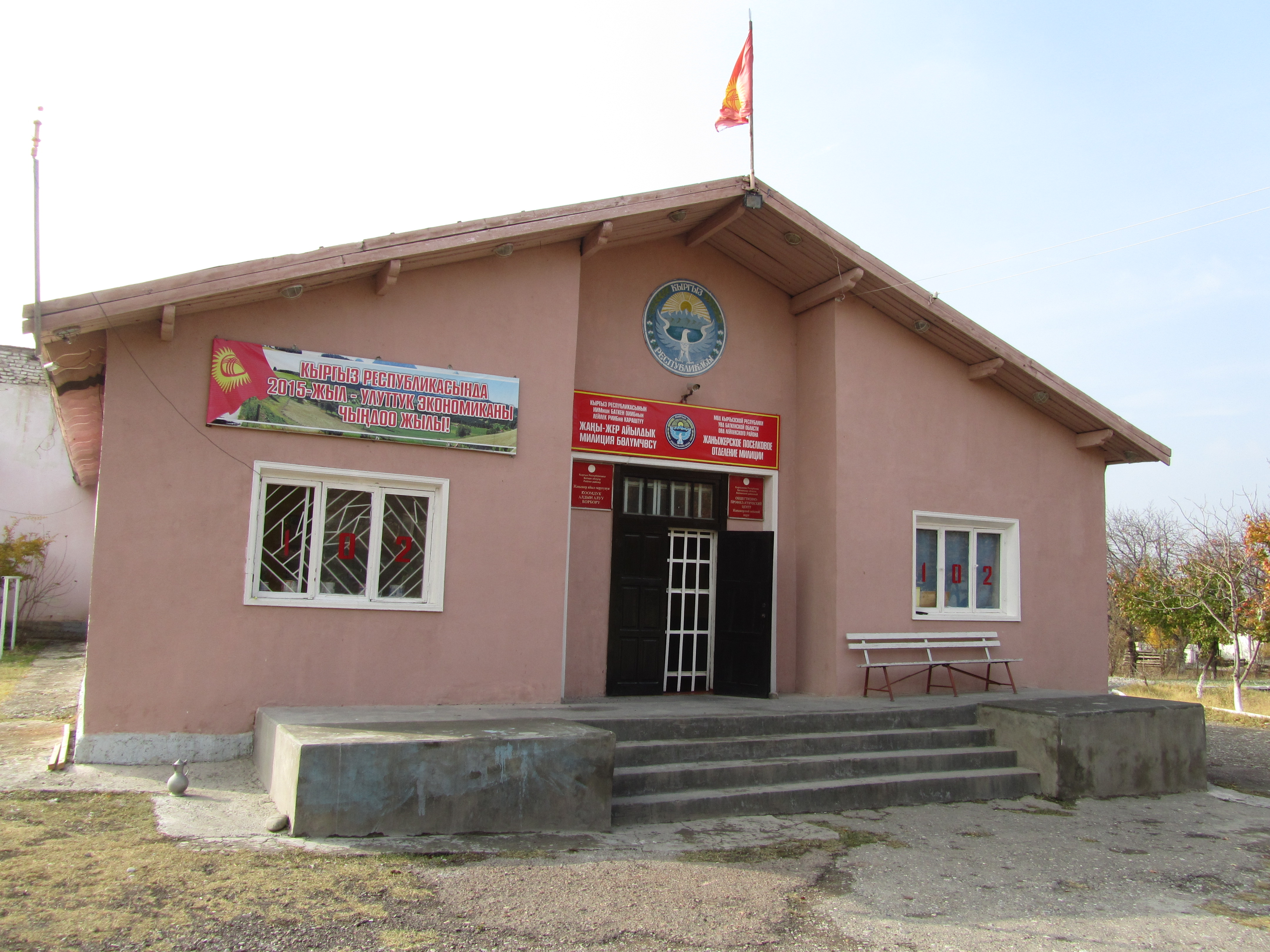
A village police station in Borborduk.

In 1991, the ministry was made into an independent organization following the fall of the USSR that year. On 23 July 1998, the Kyrgyz government approved Resolution #490, “The Concept of Development of the Ministry of Internal Affairs (MIA) of the Kyrgyz Republic”, which was the official position of the internal ministry on the main trends and principles of improvement of the operational and service activity during the transition period. Between 1999 and 2005, the Ministry of Internal Affairs began underwent a process of reform during which the quantity of internal affairs services were reduced by 50%. The General Directorate of Penitenciary Services (GUIN) was transferred to the Ministry of Justice while the State Fire Service was transferred to the Kyrgyzstan Emergency Situations Ministry. Most experts on the subject considered the 7 year reforms period as a failure as it didn't bring notable results. On 30 April 2013, the Government defined the direction of the new course of police reforms by announcing the beginning of public monitoring of changes in the law enforcement agencies.

== Structure/Subordinate institutions ==
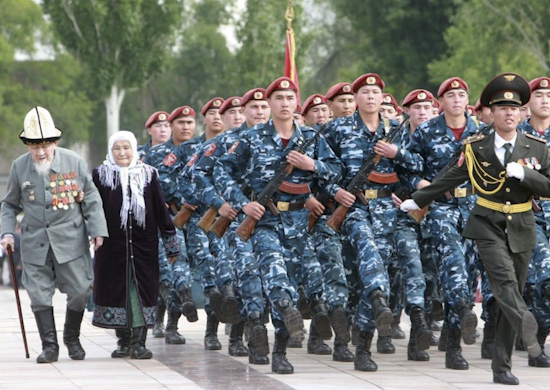
Internal Troops parading alongside a Soviet war veteran of Kyrgyz nationality in Bishkek.

- Ministry of the Interior Central Office
  - Tourist Police of Kyrgyzstan
- Internal Troops
- Territorial Divisions
- Main Headquarters
- Headquarters Staff
- Criminal Police Service
- Investigation Service
- Public Security Service
- General Directorate for Road Safety
- Internal Investigation Service
- Drug Trafficking Service
- Anti-Terrorism Service
- Secret Headquarters
- Main information and analytical center
- Main Department of Financial and Economic Support
- Main Department of State Specialized Protection
- Office of Witness Protection
- Office of Transport
- Forensic Center
- Office of Operational Analysis
- Special Regiment of the Ministry of Internal Affairs "Shumkar"
- Special Rapid Response Units (SOBR)
- Educational institutions
  - Academy of the Ministry of Internal Affairs
  - IIM High School of Kyrgyzstan

=== Internal Troops ===
The Internal Troops (Kyrgyz: Ички иштер министрлигинин ички аскерлери; abbreviated ИА/IA, Russian: Внутренние войска Министерства внутренних дел; abbreviated ВВ/VV) are paramilitary gendarmerie-like forces belonging to the Ministry of the Interior. In 2014, the Internal Troops was absorbed into the country's National Guard as a result of military reforms in the country initiated by President Almazbek Atambayev. This arrangement would stay until September 2018 when the two were separated and the Internal Troops were reformed. The reason being was that President Sooronbay Jeenbekov found that the Internal Troops as part of the National Guard have limited potential and capabilities in resolving service and combat tasks. The internal troops have served during the Osh riots (1990), the Tulip Revolution, the Kyrgyz Revolution of 2010 and the 2010 South Kyrgyzstan ethnic clashes.

On 24 August 2021, on its 80th anniversary, President Sadyr Japarov announced plans to increase the salaries of the Internal Troops by 40%.

=== SOBR ===
The Ministry of the Interior maintains several special SOBR (СОБР) teams, similar to the American SWAT teams. SOBR follows the Russian and other post-Soviet practices.

=== MVD High School ===
Established on 25 July 1925, the MVD High School (more commonly referred to as a lyceum or secondary school) trains specialists with secondary special education in law and to earn the rank of Junior Lieutenant of Police upon graduation. It was established as the Pishpek Police School before becoming a subordinate of the NKVD in November 1938, beginning with 2 years of training. On 4 October 2000, President Askar Akayev re-established the Secondary Specialized School of the MVD on the basis of the reorganization of the Training Center.

== Current command structure ==
The ministry has the following leadership structure:

- Minister of Internal Affairs - Ulan Niyazbekov
- First Deputy Minister of Internal Affairs - Major General of Police S. Omurzakov
- Vice Minister - Major General of Police K. Asanov
- Vice Minister - Colonel D. Abdykarov
- Vice Minister - Colonel A.Orozaliev

== List of ministers ==
The following is a list of ministers of the interior since 1991:

- Felix Kulov (1 July 1991 – 27 February 1992)
- Abdybek Sutalinov (27 February 1992 – 1995)
- Madabek Moldashev (1995 – 1996)
- Omurbek Kutuev (1996 – 2000)
- Tashtemir Aitbaev (2000 – 2002)
- Temirbek Akmataliev (January – May 2002)
- Bakr Subanbekov (May 2002 – 23 March 2005)
- Keneshbek Duishebaev (23 March 2005 – 24 March 2005)
- Mıktıbek Abdıldaev (24 March 2005 – June 2005)
- Murat Sutalinov (June 2005 – 2006)
- Osmonali Guronov (October – November 2006)
- Omurbek Suvanaliev (November 2006 – 2007)
- Bolotbek Nogoibaev (2007–2008)
- Moldomusa Kongantiyev (2008 – April 2010)
- Bolotbek Sherniyazov (April – July 2010)
- Kubatbek Baibolov (July – September 2010)
- Akylbek Sultanov (September 2010 – 2012)
- Shamil Atahanov (2012 – 2013)
- Abdılda Suranchiev (2013 – 2014)
- Melis Turganbaev (2014 – 2016)
- Ulan Israilov (2016 – 2018)
- Kashkar Junushaliev (2018 – 2020)
- Ulan Niyazbekov (2020 – present)
