= Academy of the Ministry of Internal Affairs of Kyrgyzstan =

Military academy in Kyrgyzstan (e. 1969)

Coordinates: 42°52′17.6″N 74°40′41.1″E

- Кыргыз Республикасынын ички иштер министрлигинин Академиясы
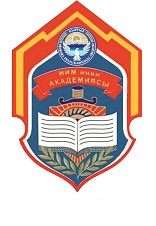
- Other names: IIM Academy; AIAMKR
- Former name: Frunze Special High School of the Militia of the Ministry of Internal Affairs of the USSR
- Type: military academy
- Established: May 19, 1969
- Affiliations: Ministry of Internal Affairs
- Commandant: Colonel Adylbek Biybosunov
- Academic staff: 28
- Location: Shoqan Walikhanov Street, Sverdlov District, Bishkek, Kyrgyzstan
- Language: Kyrgyz, Russian
- Colors
- Website: http://academy-mvd.kg

The Academy of the Ministry of Internal Affairs of the Kyrgyz Republic named after Ergesh Aliyev (Kyrgyz: Кыргыз Республикасынын ички иштер министрлигинин Академиясы, Russian: Академия Министерство внутренних дел Киргизской Республики) is a educational institution that acts as a training center for future soldiers and officers of the Internal Troops and future police officers in the Ministry of Internal Affairs. It is named after Police Major General Ergesh Aliyev, who was the first high-ranking officer in the original Kyrgyz Militia.

== History ==
It was founded in 1969 originally as the Frunze Special High School of Militia Ministry of Internal Affairs of the USSR. In October of that year, the first 64 students in the Soviet Army were accepted in the school, which had a teaching staff from secondary schools of the MVD in Stanyslaviv (Ivano-Frankivsk, Ukraine) and Yelabuga. The first head of school at that time was Major General Dzhapar Shabirov. On July 19, 1991, due to the political and social climate in the Soviet Union at the time, the school was transformed into the Bishkek Higher School of the Ministry of Internal Affairs of the Kyrgyz SSR. During this period, considerable experience was accumulated in the training and retraining of highly qualified specialists for the police and combat units of the internal troops of the country. It took what is now its current form on January 15, 2000.

== Student life ==
In order to educate, stimulate interest in study and competition, the academy annually holds traditional contests for the titles "Best Class", "Best Platoon", "Best Cadet", "Best Student" and "Best Athlete" among cadets and students. In addition, various sports tournaments and competitions are held, including the Miss Academy beauty pageant, the Kyrk Choro military sports contest and the Ala-Too Zhazy Republican Student Festival. Organizations that are available include the academy choir, a military band, a choreographic circle and a newspaper.

== Academy commandants ==
- Major General Dzhapar Shabirov (1969-1982)
- Colonel E. Usubaliev (1982-1989)
- Colonel Z. Satybaev (1989-1991)
- Lieutenant General A. Asanaliev (1991-1999)
- Lieutenant General B. Ishimov (1999-2008)
- Major General A. Mavlyanov (2008-2010)
- Colonel A. Bazarbayev (2010-2013)
- Major General Jenish Jakipov (2013-2014)
- Colonel Adylbek Biybosunov (since 2014)
