= OshTV =

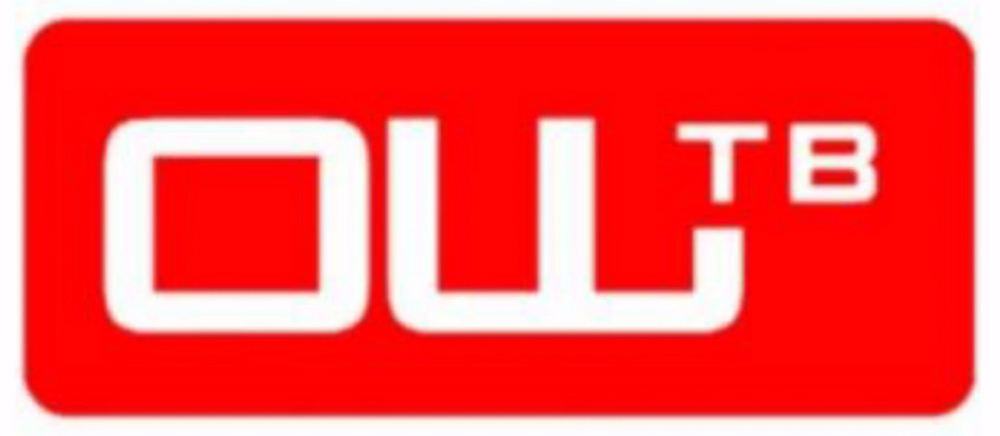

Osh; Kyrgyzstan
- City: OshTV
- Channels: Digital: 23 (UHF)

Ownership
- Owner: OcOO "ОшТВ"

History
- Founded: March 1991 by Haliljan Hudaiberdiev
- First air date: May 5, 1991
- Former channel numbers: Analog: 5 (VHF, 1991–2004); Digital: 23 (UHF, 2004–present)

Technical information
- Licensing authority: Ministry of Justice of the Kyrgyz Republic

OshTV (Kyrgyz: ОшТВ) is the first private television station in Kyrgyzstan, founded by an entrepreneur from Osh, ethnic Uzbek, Khaliljan Khudaiberdiev. It was registered in Osh in March 1991 with the Osh City Council as a small business enterprise under the "Law on the Press and Other Mass Media" of the Soviet Union. Its first programs were aired on May 5, 1991.

== History ==
Initially, the channel rented airtime to broadcast its programs using the frequency of the First State Channel of Kyrgyzstan during its daily technical breaks (from 9 am to 6 pm). After the collapse of Soviet Union and the adoption of the Law on Mass Media of Kyrgyzstan in 1992, Osh TV registered with the Ministry of Justice as a mass media company under registry #055 from April 7, 1993. In January 1995, Osh TV started broadcasting on its own 5m VHF channel with frequency resolution from the State Inspectorate of Communication (from 1997, the State Agency of Communication) and broadcast for 20 hours a day. From January 1995 to March 2004 Osh TV broadcast on 5m VHF channel and later changed to 23 UHF channel. The programs were made in Kyrgyz, Uzbek and Russian languages.

On August 22, 1998, with changes in the legislation, the channel was restructured as OshTV Television and Radio Broadcasting Company LLC (founder- Khaliljan Khudaiberdiev). On July 25, 2001 it was re-registered as a mass media outlet with the Ministry of Justice under #562. From 1991 to 2010, the staff of OshTV grew from 3 to 50 people (including volunteers). OshTV became the most popular channel in the south of Kyrgyzstan. From 2004 to 2009 it was ranked by a wide margin as "The Best Local TV" among other 5 broadcasting companies in Osh according to media research conducted by Marketing-Info Company every year for the "Choice of Southern Capital" campaign. Every year on May 5, OshTV celebrated its anniversary with thirty thousand local residents and guests.

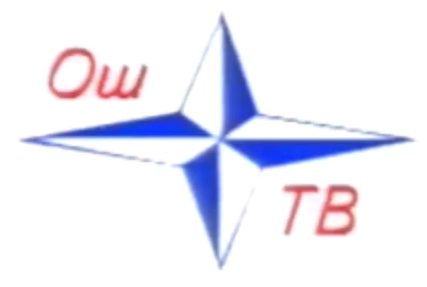
OshTV in the 1990s

The New York Times, in its issue from March 30, 2005, published an article that noted the role of Osh TV in the coverage of democratic processes in Kyrgyzstan.

== Lawsuits ==
The first lawsuit started in 1991, after the State TV and Radio Committee of Osh province of Kyrgyzstan refused to register the company. In March of that year, the court ruled in favor of OshTV and the company was registered. On March 16, 1999 the public authority the State Communication Agency of Kyrgyz Republic ordered the transfer of OshTV's broadcasting frequency from 5 VHF to 23 UHF without any compensation or warning which carried a burden on the management to supply the necessary equipment. The company filed lawsuits that led to four arbitration court hearings in Bishkek (November 18, 2000, February 1, 2001, June 12, 2001 September 13, 2001). OshTV's claim was satisfied and the company was allowed to use the VHF frequency for some time. However, in March 2004 the company was forced to leave the VHF frequency and since then has been broadcasting on the frequency 23 UHF.

== 2010 ethnic clashes ==
The wide popularity of the channel, its independence and influence on public opinion, as well as anti-Uzbek sentiments in Kyrgyzstan are among the main causes of pressure on the company, its employees and leadership. During the ethnic clashes that erupted in the south of Kyrgyzstan in June 2010, OshTV was at the center of controversy. It was taken over by the mayor of Osh city Melis Myrzakmatov and the company's leadership and journalists had to resign and hide for fear of reprisals from the authorities and persecution on the part of the population. Many of them left the country. The creative team of the company has changed and the broadcasting is done only in the Kyrgyz language. After the 2010 clashes, the founder and owner of OshTV Khaliljan Khudaiberdiev was forced to give away 51% of the company shares to other people. Later, during his political exile, he was sentenced to 20 years of prison with confiscation of his properties. According to Khudaiberdiev himself and other journalists, the case was fabricated. Khudaiberdiev's appeals to higher courts of Kyrgyzstan were not satisfied. His appeal to the UN Committee of Human Rights is now under review. With the decision of the Osh Inter-regional Court from December 8, 2010 Khudaiberdiev was excluded from the list of founders of Osh TV and full ownership of the company was given to Kanbolot Koshbaev Orozovich. On April 5, 2011 the ownership was transferred to Abdykaparov A. (the leader of Uluttar Birimdigi political party). With the decision of the Osh Regional Court from March 6, 2014 and May 12, 2014, and later of Osh Inter-regional Court from March 31, 2014, all previous court decisions and agreements made in the case of Osh TV beginning from July 2, 2010 were invalidated and full ownership of the company was given back to Khudaiberdiev. On June 30, 2014 based on the decision of Jalal-Abad city court and other court decisions, the Kyrgyz State Property Committee ruled to nationalize Osh TV, making it a state-owned broadcaster.

== Former employees ==
Many of Osh TV's former employees are now leading journalists and technical experts in the major mass media companies of Kyrgyzstan.

- Shakirov Mamirjon – first deputy chief editor, director of DDD TV channel. He later founded Mezon TV Company.
- Mamyrkanov Ernis – former executive director, ex-Deputy Minister of Transport and Communication of Kyrgyzstan.
- Karimov Uktam (aka Sarvar Usmon) – former chief editor, currently anchor of Radio Liberty (Ozodlik).
- Maksuda Aitieva – anchor, presently Director General of ElTR, the second biggest national TV channel of Kyrgyzstan.
- Aida Kasymalieva — anchor, Kyrgyz journalist and politician who has been deputy speaker of the Supreme Council since December 2018.
