= Kyrgyz Revolution =

The Kyrgyz Revolution or Kyrgyzstani Revolution may refer to:

- The Tulip Revolution of 2005
- The Kyrgyz Revolution of 2010
- The Kyrgyz Revolution of 2020
