= 2010 South Kyrgyzstan ethnic clashes =

Coordinates: 40.53°N 72.8°E

2010 South Kyrgyzstan Uzbek Massacre
- Part of Kyrgyz Revolution of 2010
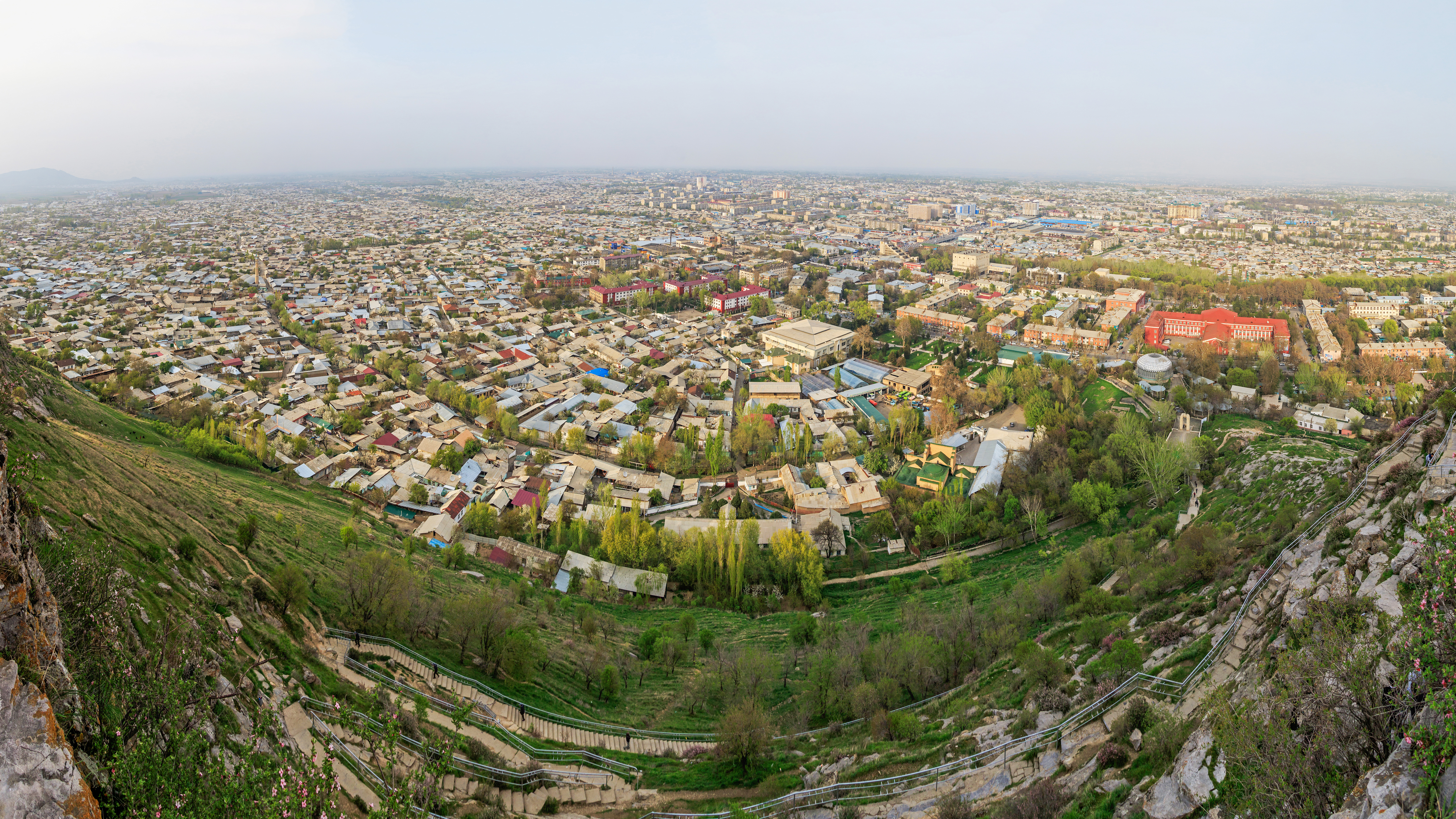
- Panorama of part of the city of Osh (Kyrgyzstan), 2016
Date	May–June 2010
Location	Kyrgyzstan: Osh, Jalal-Abad; Uzbekistan: Sokh, Sogment (Uzbekistani enclaves in Kyrgyzstan) and bordering areas in Kyrgyzstan
Result	Bishkek government regains partial control over southern provinces; limited exodus of the Uzbek minority; Uzbek language suppressed in public life

Belligerents
Kyrgyzstani Kyrgyz gangs; Pro-Bakiyev Kyrgyz; Other pro-Bakiyev forces; Tajik PMCs; Tajikstani Tajiks; Russian Tajiks; Other mercenaries; Uzbekistani Kyrgyz civilians^{1}; Sokh Uzbekistani Kyrgyz; Sogment Uzbekistani Kyrgyz; Islamic Movement of Uzbekistan (alleged)	Kyrgyzstani Uzbek gangs; Pro-provisional government civilians; Uzbekistani Uzbek civilians^{1}; Sokh Uzbekistani Uzbeks; Sogment Uzbekistani Uzbeks; Supported by: Uzbekistan (limited involv.)^{2}	Kyrgyzstan provisional government; Supported by: Turkmenistan; Iran; Kazakhstan; China; Russia; Turkey; United States

Casualties and losses
- Official figures: 393–893 killed, 1,900 injured, 100,000 – 250,000 refugees (to Uzbekistan) (According to the UN and ICG 400,000 displaced, 111,000 refugees to Uzbekistan) Unofficial figures: more than 2,000 killed
- ^{1} Involved in Kyrgyz-Uzbek clashes within Uzbekistani enclave of Sokh and in minor skirmishes amongst Kyrgyzstani Kyrgyz on bordering areas.^{2} Involved only briefly in defense of Uzbek population in Uzbekistani enclave of Sokh within Kyrgyzstan.

The 2010 South Kyrgyzstan ethnic clashes, (Note: Uzbek: Qirgʻiziston janubidagi tartibsizliklar, Қирғизистон жанубидаги тартибсизликлар; Russian: Беспорядки на юге Киргизии) also known as the Osh riots, (Note: Kyrgyz: Ош коогалаңы, romanized: Oş koogalañy) were clashes between ethnic Kyrgyz and Uzbeks in southern Kyrgyzstan, primarily in the cities of Osh and Jalal-Abad, in the aftermath of the ouster of former President Kurmanbek Bakiyev on 7 April. It is part of the larger Kyrgyz Revolution of 2010. Violence that started between Kyrgyz and Uzbeks on 19 May in Jalal-Abad escalated on 10 June in Osh.

The spreading of the violence required the Russian-endorsed interim government led by Roza Otunbayeva to declare a state of emergency on 12 June, in an attempt to take control of the situation. Uzbekistan launched a limited troop incursion early on, but withdrew and opened its borders to Uzbek refugees. The clashes killed nearly 420 people, mostly Uzbeks, and displaced another 80,000.

== Background ==
=== Soviet period ===
After national delimitation in the Soviet Union (1917-mid-1930s), the peoples of Central Asia began a process of ethnogenesis in which they began to define themselves as "Kyrgyz" or "Turkmen", rather than with reference to their religion or locality. The people defined by Soviet ethnographers as Kyrgyz were generally nomadic, and the people defined as Uzbek, sedentary.

Following the dissolution of the Soviet Union, the Kyrgyz president Askar Akayev suppressed Kyrgyz ethnic nationalism, favoring Pan-Islamic and Pan-Turkic unity until he was overthrown in the 2005 Tulip Revolution.

=== 1990 violence ===
In June 1990, a violent land dispute between the Kyrgyz and Uzbeks erupted in the city of Osh. A group of Kyrgyz demanded that a predominantly Uzbek collective farm be allocated to them to build housing. Uzbek activists objected and violent clashes between the two ethnic groups ensued. Until groups of Kyrgyz came from the surrounding villages, the Uzbeks had the upper hand. A state of emergency and curfew were introduced and the border between the Uzbek and Kyrgyz republics was closed. Soviet troops were deployed to stop the violence. Order was not restored until August. Official estimates of the death toll range from over 300 to more than 600. Unofficial figures range up to more than 1,000.

=== Anti-Uzbek sentiments ===
In southern Kyrgyzstan, ethnic Uzbeks have been highly active in the local economy, especially in trade and services, and more recently also in agriculture. In Kyrgyz public opinion, wealthy Uzbek Kyrgyzstani leaders such as Qodirjon Botirov have attempted to turn this economic clout into political power, promoting a militant Uzbek nationalism which demands official Uzbek language status in Kyrgyzstan, and a number of seats reserved solely for Uzbeks in the Kyrgyz parliament. The Kyrgyz also think that Uzbeks are "growing wealthy off the backs of the pauperized Kyrgyz" and seeking to destroy Kyrgyzstan's unity with their calls for linguistic and political autonomy.

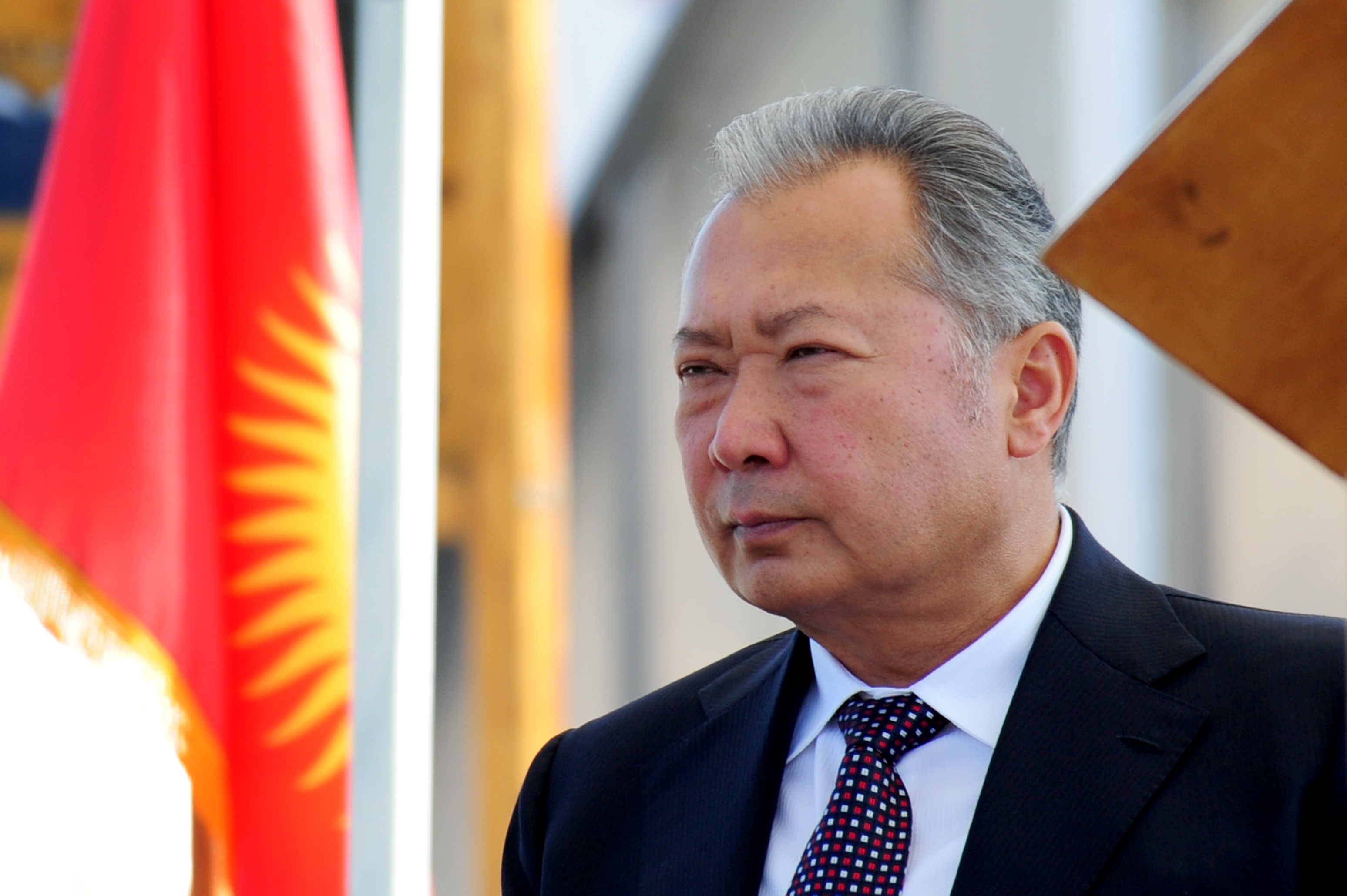
Kurmanbek Bakiyev in 2009

At the same time, the cities of Kyrgyzstan have received a mass influx of young Kyrgyz people from rural areas who, having difficulty finding work and permanent housing, are likely to become involved in criminal gangs. Decisions about ethnic problems are not taking place at the government level, as their very existence is not recognized and, moreover, virtually all administrative positions are held by ethnic Kyrgyz.

Many Uzbeks say ousted President Kurmanbek Bakiyev favored Kyrgyz people. Many Kyrgyz in the south strongly supported Bakiyev, even after he was overthrown. Currently Bakiyev is in exile in Belarus. Bakyt Beshimov noted that after 7 April uprising the interim government was unable to control the situation in Kyrgyzstan, paving the way for major disturbances. "Ruthless" struggle for power was noted by him as a major cause.

Many Kyrgyz feel that their sovereignty is threatened by their neighbor Uzbekistan, and Kyrgyz media often reports on Uzbekistan's supposed desire to protect Uzbek people abroad. Kyrgyzstan has a long disputed border with the country, over which Uzbekistan has unilaterally erected a barrier. The Uzbek National Security Service has been known to perform deadly intelligence operations in Kyrgyzstan, and there is also Kyrgyz fear about infiltration from the militant Islamic Movement of Uzbekistan.

=== Possible instigators ===
Some sources initially claimed the riots were orchestrated from outside forces. There were multiple reports of organized groups of gunmen in ski masks, believed to be from neighboring Tajikistan, shooting both Uzbeks and Kyrgyz to ignite the riots. However, the head of Kyrgyzstan security forces denied such claims of the media.

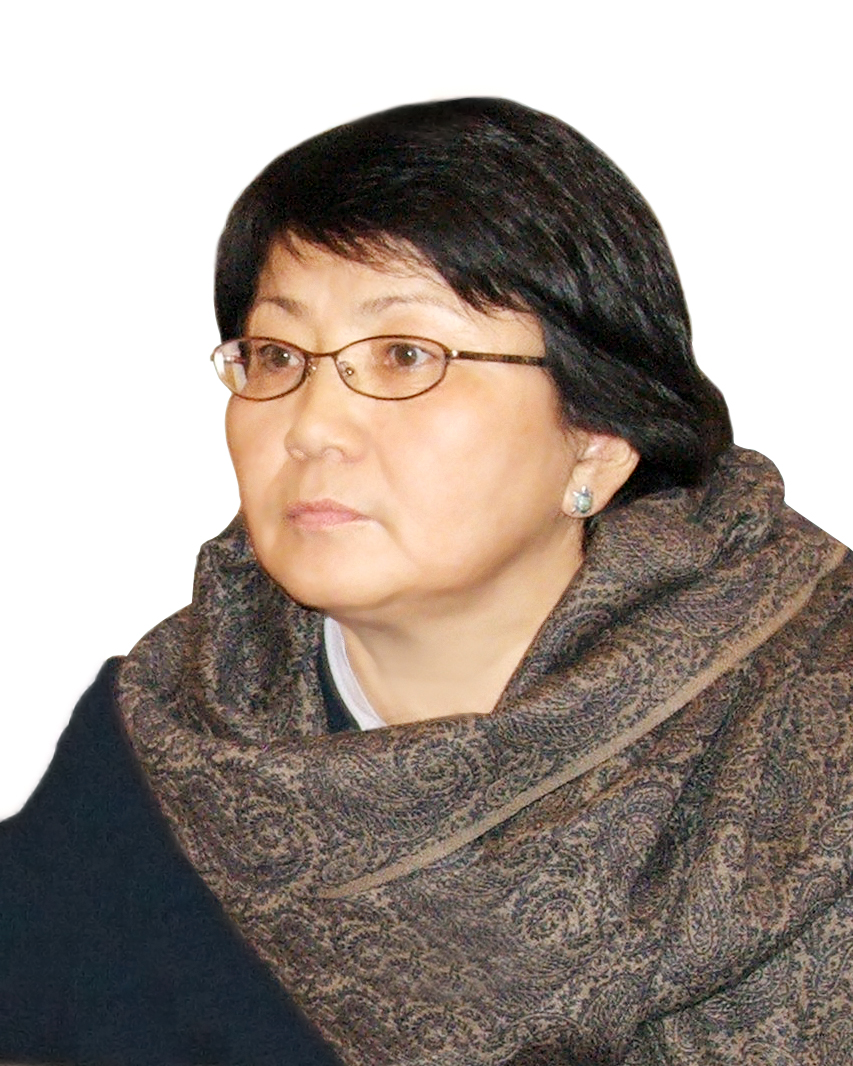
Roza Otunbaeva in 2008

The interim Kyrgyz government led by Roza Otunbayeva claimed that the former president, Kurmanbek Bakiyev, and his connections were behind the riots, although no proof of this claim was presented. Kyrgyz deputy Prime Minister Almazbek Atambayev has also claimed that the riots were paid for with $10 million from Bakiyev's son, Maxim Bakiyev.

Some have also called for Russian involvement, but the Kremlin refused to get involved with forces even at the request of the interim government.

On 14 May, media outlets broadcast a tapped telephone conversation between Communist Party leader Iskhak Masaliyev and other politicians. They discussed organizing mass protests in southern Kyrgyzstan. The people included Bakiyev's adviser Usen Sydykov, then a powerful politician in Kyrgyzstan. The Kyrgyzstan security forces arrested the two. Masaliyev had just arrived from Moscow. The arrest fueled speculation that the Kremlin was working to produce instability.

Elmira Nogoybayeva, the head of the Kyrgyz Polis Asia Analytic Center, noted in May that Russia and its ally Kazakhstan launched a consistent mass media campaign to discredit the image of Kyrgyzstan. On 14 June 2010, Eurasian expert Giorgi Kvelashvili stated that Moscow's actions appeared to be part of a larger calculated plan.

International organizations have not supported the view that the June events were orchestrated from outside. According to Human Rights Watch "[the] violence in southern Kyrgyzstan began on June 10, when a large crowd of ethnic Uzbeks gathered in response to a minor fight between Uzbeks and Kyrgyz in a casino in the center of Osh. Several violent attacks during the night of June 10 against ethnic Kyrgyz and the torching of several buildings enraged ethnic Kyrgyz from Osh and outside villages, thousands of whom filed into the city."

Uzbekistan was supposed to be concerned that Russia was using the events to consolidate its power over Central Asia, including Uzbekistan. Stratfor reported on 13 June that "the crisis has moved from being an internal Kyrgyz emergency to a confrontation between Uzbekistan and Russia. Russia has proven this past year that it is on a path of consolidation in Central Asia – of which Uzbekistan could be the toughest link in the chain to control".

== Outbreak ==
In late May 2010, hundreds of residents of the Uzbek enclave of Sokh in Kyrgyzstan blocked a main highway leading to Uzbekistan, demanding greater security after several of their cars were allegedly vandalized. Uzbekistan then deployed limited military and police forces into the enclave, but they withdrew on 3 June.

During the political chaos that followed the ouster of Kurmanbek Bakiyev tensions between the Kyrgyz and Uzbeks increased. Violence erupted in the evening of 10 June in Osh. According to most accounts, a dispute in a casino between young Uzbeks and Kyrgyz was a watershed in the violence. Both groups called friends to come to help and clashes continued throughout the night. Crowds of Kyrgyz from the countryside flocked to Osh, Jalal-Abad, and other towns to join the local Kyrgyz and Uzbek crowds to attack each other's neighborhoods. From 11 June through 14 June, there were killings and tortures, looting and setting fire to homes and businesses.

== Course of events ==
Between 9 and 10 June 2010, rioting in the city of Osh between ethnic Kyrgyz and the minority Uzbek population resulted in at least 46 people dead and 637 injured, many seriously. Gunfire was reported throughout the day in the southern cities and a state of emergency was declared, resulting in the deployment of military units to restore law and order.

On 12 June, Kyrgyzstan's interim government asked Russia to help quell ethnic fighting, claiming the army and police had lost control. Moscow said it could not get involved at that stage because the crisis was an internal affair of Kyrgyzstan. President Dmitri A. Medvedev of Russia and President Hu Jintao of China vowed to support Kyrgyzstan's provisional government in restoring order.

The Kyrgyz interim government passed a decree declaring a partial mobilization of the civilian reservists. On 13 June, Kyrgyz recruitment offices began registering the reservists. The Kyrgyz government also authorized security forces to use deadly force and shoot to kill.

On 12 and 13 June, the International Committee of the Red Cross expressed its deep concern about the worsening humanitarian situation and called on the Kyrgyz authorities to do everything in their power to protect their citizens, restore order and ensure respect for the rule of law.

In the morning of 15 June the national security board chairman Alik Orozov described the situation in southern provinces as "People have gone insane, they are confronting each other. The situation has become uncontrollable, it's true chaos".

On 16 June, The Washington Post reported that the violence began to subside in Jalal-Abad. However, it reported that "when residents were asked about what had happened – about why neighbors had turned against each other so suddenly and in such brutal fashion – the simmering anger between the Kyrgyz and the minority Uzbeks quickly surfaced, hinting at the continuing volatility of the situation". The Washington Post also reported that Uzbek and Kyrgyz residents blame each other for the violence. Kyrgyz soldiers and police officers set up roadblocks and began patrols after the worst of the violence was over.

== Victims ==
The exact number of people killed in the clashes remains uncertain. In January 2011, a National Commission composed of local experts reported 426 people died in the violence, among them 276 Uzbeks and 105 ethnic Kyrgyz. Unofficial sources reported "thousands" killed, several thousands wounded and tens of thousands of refugees. These figures are higher than official data as authorities counted only those who died in hospitals and those who were formally buried during the days of the violence. In accordance with Islamic law, many people buried their dead relatives immediately without registering them.

According to sources from the ethnic Uzbek community, at least 700 ethnic Uzbeks were killed in Jalal-Abad, where clashes were less intense than in Osh. According to local sources, in Osh from 1,526 to more than 2,000 people died in the pogroms. Residents of Jalal-Abad claimed that at least 2,000 people died in total and the official figures were too low. The Uzbek edition of Radio Free Europe/Radio Liberty reported on 16 June 2010, that 2,608 Uzbeks had been killed since the beginning of the clashes. The residents of the city of Osh reported that the bodies of 1,170 Uzbeks were taken from the streets and ruins and buried by members of the Uzbek community.

The killings were performed with fearsome cruelty – many victims were raped and burned alive. Armed gangs tried to prevent the wounded from receiving first aid. In Jalal-Abad crowds attacked the hospital where the wounded were receiving treatment. The violence was facilitated by neglect from local police and military. Moreover, many sources and international organizations claimed that the local military actively participated in the ethnic clashes and looting. At least five policemen were reported to have been killed during the clashes.

The violence caused thousands of people to flee their homes. According to the United Nations and other international organizations, 400,000 refugees were displaced by the pogroms and over 111,000 people fled across the border to Uzbekistan.

It was reported that local authorities arrested a number of Uzbek activists who were trying to collect photo and video evidence of the violence.

== Kyrgyz security forces' hand in the violence ==
A great number of witnesses and international organizations have suspected the Kyrgyz authorities' hand in the pogroms. Human Rights Watch investigated the violence and published a report entitled "Where is the Justice?": Interethnic Violence in Southern Kyrgyzstan and its Aftermath. The report seriously questioned the claim that the attacks were spontaneous, citing witnesses who saw firsthand how people in uniforms jumped out of armored personnel carriers and fired automatic weapons shouting anti-Uzbek slurs.

The attacks on Osh's Uzbek neighborhoods of Cheremushki, Shait-Tepe, Shark, and others, described to Human Rights Watch independently by dozens of witnesses, showed a consistent pattern. In many accounts, individuals in camouflage uniforms on armored military vehicles entered the neighborhoods first, removing the makeshift barricades that Uzbek residents had erected. They were followed by armed men who shot and chased away any remaining residents, and cleared the way for the looters.

The authorities claimed that Kyrgyz mobs stole the military uniforms, weapons, and vehicles that were used in the attacks. Observers pointed out that if this claim was true, it would raise a separate set of questions regarding the military's loss of control over weapons and equipment that ended up in the hands of mobs attacking ethnic Uzbeks and their property.

The interim government granted shoot-to-kill powers to its security forces in the south of Kyrgyzstan, which was criticized by human rights organizations. The interim government's shoot-to-kill orders resulted in indiscriminate killing of many ethnic Uzbeks. Different sources suspected the Kyrgyz security forces' hand in the violence. On 3 May 2011, in the article "Kyrgyzstan's Army Implicated in Ethnic Bloodshed," the Associated Press reported that an international investigation into the causes of the ethnic conflict had concluded that Kyrgyz security forces' handing out of weapons to mobs during the violence was an indication of the military's complicity in the violence. Human Rights Watch also reported some government forces' involvement in the attacks on Uzbek neighborhoods:

... the security forces seemed to respond differently to acts of violence depending on the ethnicity of the perpetrators, raising concerns that capacity was not the only reason for the failure to protect ethnic Uzbeks. The security forces seemed to focus resources on addressing the danger presented by Uzbeks, but not by Kyrgyz, even after it became clear that Kyrgyz mobs posed an imminent threat; and the forces took very limited, if any, operational measures to protect the Uzbek population.

The police and local authorities failed to stop the spread of the pogroms, which was seen as proof of the total ineffectiveness of the interim government headed by Roza Otunbayeva. Although the Kyrgyz government that failed to establish law and order during the violence blamed external forces for the bloody clashes, it did not provide evidence to support this claim.

Human rights violations were committed by security forces not only during the June events, but also in their aftermath. After the violence stopped, Kyrgyz law enforcement officers carried out arbitrary arrests, ill-treated detainees, beat and insulted residents, and in some cases even killed people. The Kyrgyz security forces carried out sweep operations, purportedly to confiscate illegal weapons. Investigations carried out by international organizations such as Human Rights Watch and Amnesty International concluded that law enforcement agencies had conducted arbitrary raids mainly in Uzbek neighborhoods:

After the initial violence subsided security forces started to carry out search operations in villages and homes, ostensibly to seize weapons and detain those responsible for committing violent crimes. These large scale operations were carried out over a couple of weeks until the end of June. There were numerous reports that security forces were using excessive force during these operations and that they were targeting Uzbek neighbourhoods. Human rights organizations, journalists and community leaders reported that hundreds of men, the majority of them Uzbek, were arbitrarily detained and beaten or otherwise ill-treated and tortured during such raids and subsequently during their detention.

Human Rights Watch received dozens of reports of police officials asking for exorbitant bribes of up to $10,000 for the release of detainees. Security officers demanded money from the families of detainees to free their relatives or prevent others from being arrested. The overwhelming majority of detainees were Uzbeks. Many detainees were ill-treated, intimidated, and brutally beaten. Human rights organizations also reported that the security forces planted evidence, beat people with rifles, destroyed documents, stole possessions, and ill-treated detainees. "Many reported being held incommunicado in police or national security custody, beaten, or otherwise ill-treated and tortured to force them to confess to a crime or to incriminate a relative, a neighbour, an employer or a friend." Kyrgyz Security forces injured 39 people, two of whom died in hospital, in the village of Nariman.

Authorities harassed and attacked lawyers representing clients, predominantly ethnic Uzbeks, with regard to the ethnic violence. Lawyers reported that local authorities prevented them from seeing their clients, let alone helping them. Officials insulted and threatened lawyers defending ethnic Uzbeks on repeated occasions.

Ethnically motivated attacks continued in the south of Kyrgyzstan after the large-scale violence diminished in intensity. The authorities did little to halt the attacks, either because they were unable to or unwilling to stop them. Human Rights Watch reported a dozen of people, mostly women, were attacked and brutally beaten in front of the Osh City Police Department, while a large number of armed policemen did nothing to stop the attacks. Local authorities did not investigate ill-treatment in custody. The chief military prosecutor told Human Rights Watch that the sweep operation in Nariman would not be investigated because he regarded the actions of the law enforcement agencies—including shooting and brutal beatings that resulted in two deaths—as "lawful and adequate."

== Aftermath ==
=== Torture and arbitrary arrests in the aftermath of the violence ===
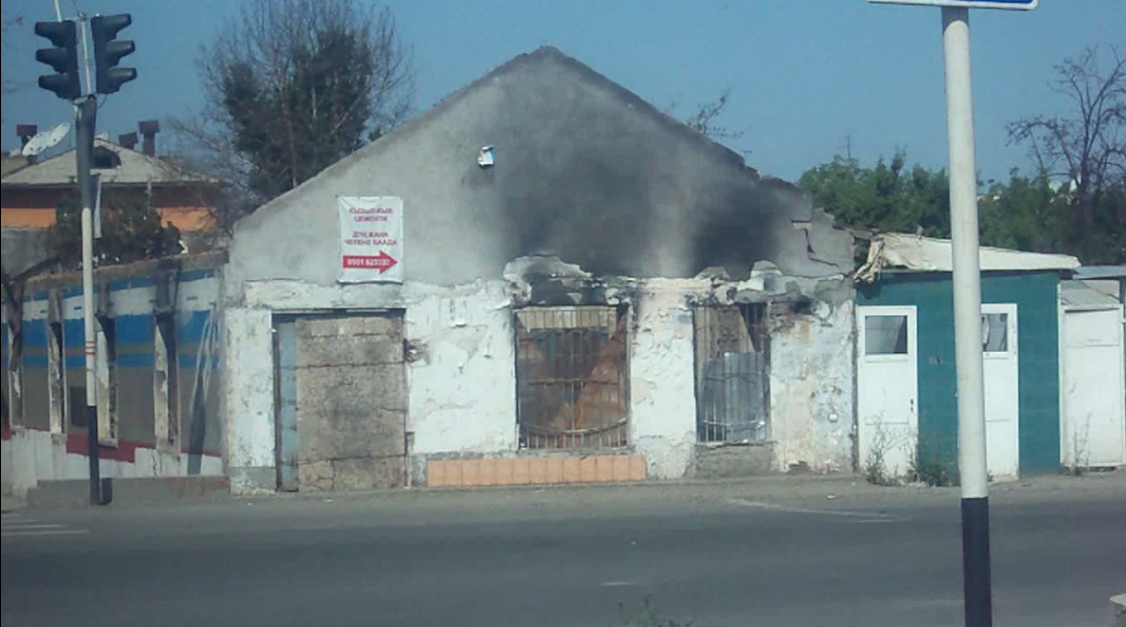
A burned-down building in Osh a year after the clashes

In trials following the violence in southern Kyrgyzstan, the majority of defendants have been ethnic Uzbek. In early 2012, ethnic Uzbeks made up 77 per cent of those detained and charged for crimes related to the June 2010 violence. This has perpetuated the widely propagated theory in Kyrgyz political circles that the Uzbeks started the violence.

Dozens of prominent Uzbek religious and community leaders were arrested by security forces following the riots, including journalist and human rights activist Azimzhan Askarov. Following a trial criticized by several international human rights organizations, Askarov was charged with creating mass disturbances, incitement of ethnic hatred, complicity in murder and was given a life sentence. Various human rights organizations stated that they believed the charges against him and his co-defendants to be politically motivated, and Amnesty International designated Askarov a prisoner of conscience.

On 29 March 2012, the International Crisis Group (ICG) published a report which stated that ethnic tensions between Uzbeks and Kyrgyz continue to grow since June 2010 in southern Kyrgyzstan, "largely because of the state's neglect and southern leaders' anti-Uzbek policies." The report noted that the current superficial silence in the south was not a sign of success. According to the ICG, unless systematic measures are taken, further violence may erupt and even the most determined ethnic nationalist like Melis Myrzakmatov is unlikely to keep the Uzbek minority silenced forever.

The Crisis Group reported that, contrary to common belief, the violence in southern Kyrgyzstan was not a fringe phenomenon perpetrated by ruthless, uneducated, and unemployed youth and corrupt politicians only. In reality even the more or less educated middle-class Kyrgyz do not have a conciliatory attitude. Few people in southern Kyrgyzstan have had access to any analysis of the riots that challenge the versions that blame Uzbeks as dangerous outsiders. Educated activist and professionals in southern Kyrgyzstan believe that the Uzbeks brought ruin upon themselves. Few Kyrgyz admit that discrimination and humiliation of ethnic Uzbeks in southern Kyrgyzstan has long been unbearable. They dismiss the report of the Independent International Commission of Inquiry which documents how weapons, mostly automatic rifles, were distributed to Kyrgyz crowds and that armoured personnel carriers had been surrendered without resistance and subsequently used in attacks on Uzbek communities.

Following the June events ethnic Uzbeks have been subjected to arbitrary detentions, extortion and torture. Juan Méndez, the UN Special Rapporteur on torture, issued a report in December 2011 in which he wrote: "serious human rights violations committed in the context of ongoing investigations into the events of June 2010 and after have continued unabated in recent months."

=== Melis Myrzakmatov's emergence as a nationalist leader ===
Following the violence a new leadership surfaced in southern Kyrgyzstan. Openly nationalist Osh mayor Melis Myrzakmatov, a Bakiyev appointee, emerged as the preeminent political figure in the south. Myrzakmatov and other southern nationalists formed the party Ata-Zhurt which won 28 seats out of 120 in the 2010 Kyrgyzstani parliamentary election. The party initially campaigned to roll back the new constitution and bring Bakiyev back from exile in Belarus.

Myrzakmatov is a radical nationalist leader and openly bears an ethnic Kyrgyz-first policy. He has largely ignored the capital Bishkek in his actions. This situation did not change even after the supposedly neutral northerner Almazbek Atambayev was elected president in December 2011. Senior members of Atambayev's administration "express dismay at tensions in the south but say they have no way of influencing the situation there."

In late 2011, Myrzakmatov published a book entitled In Search of the Truth. The Osh Tragedy: Documents, Facts, Appeals, and Declarations (Russian: В поисках истины. Ошская трагедия: документы, факты, интервью, обращения и заявления), both in Kyrgyz and Russian, in which he presented his own version of the June events. In the book he took a radical anti-Uzbek approach and portrayed Uzbeks as a separatist group and "stressed the need for non-Kyrgyz ethnic groups to understand their future role would be as subordinates."

In his book Myrzakmatov gives a dubious account of the events in Southern Kyrgyzstan. "Many details are questionable, and key events are missing. There is little reference to attacks on Uzbek districts, and no discussion of casualties in Uzbek areas." According to Myrzakmatov, the Kyrgyz were caught off-guard by the attack of Uzbeks who were "armed to the teeth" but the attack was thwarted by Myrzakmatov and a few other similar "heroic" ethnic Kyrgyz who were inspired by Manas, a hero of a Kyrgyz legend.

On 5 December 2013, the Prime Minister of Kyrgyzstan Zhantoro Satybaldiyev issued a decree and dismissed Myrzakmatov from his post as mayor of Osh. Despite being dismissed, Myrzakmatov was allowed to take part in a new mayoral election that was held on January 15, 2014. He was defeated by pro-presidential candidate Aitmamat Kadyrbaev. Both Myrzakmatov's dismissal and his defeat in the election provoked mass protests by his supporters.

=== Rise of the nationalist party Ata-Zhurt ===
The support from the United States, Uzbekistan, and Russia for the Uzbek side of the riots has fueled conspiracy theories in Kyrgyzstan. The Kyrgyz nationalist party Ata-Zhurt has interpreted the ethnic unrest as fueling from a Kyrgyzstan government failure to promote respect for Kyrgyz language and culture among minorities, such as Uzbeks.

=== Fate of the Uzbek language ===
In the aftermath of the ethnic clashes Kyrgyz authorities have taken measures to remove the Uzbek language from public life. Uzbek schools are being pressured to switch to Kyrgyz across Kyrgyzstan. All signs in Uzbek have been removed from public places and Uzbek TV and radio channels have been closed.

Under Myrzakmatov's leadership a bell was erected in Osh in memory of the victims of the June 2010 violence. Even though the violence took place between the Kyrgyz and Uzbeks, the bell has inscriptions calling for peace in three languages, namely Kyrgyz, Russian, and English, but not in Uzbek.

=== International Commission of Inquiry ===
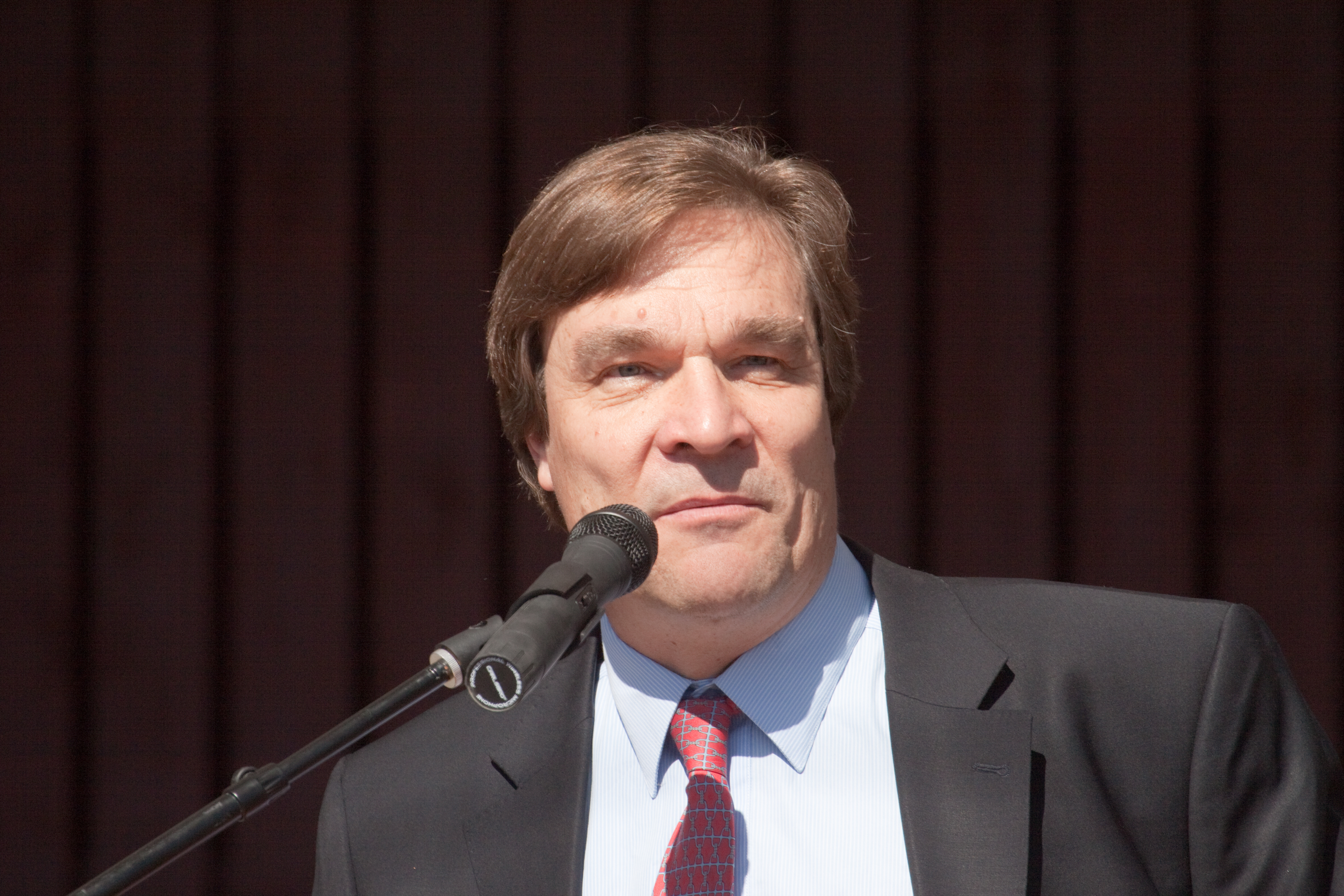
The findings of the KIC infuriated the Kyrgyz government and the members of the Kyrgyz parliament declared the commission's chair, Dr. Kimmo Kiljunen, persona non-grata

At the Kyrgyz government's request an independent commission into the events in southern Kyrgyzstan in June 2010 was formed to study and report on the ethnic clashes. The Independent International Commission of Inquiry (KIC) was formed by the Nordic countries' initiative for an independent international inquiry and was accepted by the President of the Kyrgyz Republic, Roza Otunbayeva. The KIC published its report, both in Russian and English, in early May 2011. The findings of the report were based on interviews of nearly 750 witnesses, 700 documents, about 5,000 photographs and 1,000 video extracts. The panel of the commission included seven prominent members from Finland, Australia, Estonia, France, Russia, Turkey and the United Kingdom.

The KIC reported that it found serious violations of international law, some of which could amount to crimes against humanity. The report criticized the "ineptitude and irresolution" of the interim government headed by Otunbayeva in preventing and stopping the violence. The KIC noted that weapons, mostly automatic rifles, were distributed to Kyrgyz crowds and that armoured personnel carriers had been surrendered without resistance and later used in attacks on Uzbek communities.

The findings of the KIC infuriated and alarmed the Kyrgyz government and the members of the Kyrgyz parliament declared the commission's chair Dr. Kimmo Kiljunen, the Organization for Security and Co-operation in Europe Parliamentary Assembly's special representative for Central Asia, persona non-grata.

The KIC qualified the violations under international law and reported:

"It is the view of the KIC that the violence of June does not qualify as either war crimes or genocide. However, if the evidence of some acts committed during certain attacks against the mahallas (Note: Mahalla is an Uzbek word that refers to a traditional Uzbek neighborhood.) in Osh on 11, 12 and 13 June was proven beyond reasonable doubt in a court of law, those acts would amount to crimes against humanity. These are murder, rape, other forms of sexual violence, physical violence (as another inhumane act) and persecution against an identifiable group on ethnic grounds."

The KIC stated that if the security forces had been properly instructed and deployed, the violence would possibly have been prevented or stopped. "The failure of members of the security forces to protect their equipment raises questions of complicity in the events, either directly or indirectly. Further, some members of the military were involved in some of the attacks on the mahallas." The KIC recommended Kyrgyzstan to take a strong stand against nationalism and ethnic exclusivity. It also called for the establishment of a truth and reconciliation commission and international follow-up to carry out the recommendations of the report.

== Reconciliation efforts ==
Following the ethnic clashes, several international organizations and NGOs such as the OSCE, UN, and USAID have been supporting reconciliation efforts in affected areas around southern Kyrgyzstan.

=== Community Security Initiative ===
In November 2010, the OSCE started helping the Kyrgyzstani police in their activities through the Community Security Initiative (CSI) project. The main objective of the CSI was "to increase the respect for and protection of human rights by the police and to build confidence between law enforcement agencies and communities including through the promotion of multi-ethnic policing."

The CSI worked in collaboration with the OSCE's Police Reform Programme and High Commissioner on National Minorities (HCNM). The project also collaborated with a large number of national authorities in Kyrgyzstan, including the Ombudsman, Prosecutor General, the State Penitentiary Service, the Ministry of Interior, the Ministry of Justice, and the Ministry of Health. The project was officially ended on 11 December 2015.

== See also ==
- Andijan massacre
- Kyrgyzstan–Uzbekistan border
- 2020 Dungan–Kazakh ethnic clashes
