= Nomad TV =

- Country: Kyrgyzstan
- Headquarters: Bishkek

Programming
- Language: Russian

History
- Launched: November 23, 2025

Links
- Website: nomadtv.kg

Nomad TV (Russian:Номад ТВ) is a Kyrgyz television channel based in Bishkek, Kyrgyzstan, that launched on November 23, 2025. It calls itself as a joint Kyrgyz-Russian project broadcasting local and world news in both Russian and Kyrgyz.

== History ==
The launch of the channel on November 23, 2025 was attended by Maria Zakharova. Vladimir Putin gave an exclusive interview to the channel as well. The channel is run by Anna Abakumova, a former journalist for RT known for her reporting from Russian-occupied Ukraine. The channel has connections to Evrazia, a pro-Kremlin NGO sanctioned by the European Union for election interference. Evrazia is funded by Ilan Shor, a pro-Russian oligarch from Moldova.
