= Melis Myrzakmatov =

Mayor of Osh
- In office 26 January 2009 – 5 December 2013
- Succeeded by: Aitmamat Kadyrbaev

Personal details
- Born: April 18, 1969 (age 57) Village Papan, Osh, Kyrgyz SSR
- Party: Uluttar Birimdigi
- Spouse: Nurgul Myrzakmatova

Melis Myrzakmatov (Kyrgyz: Мелис Мырзакматов; Russian: Мелис Мырзакматов) (born April 18, 1969) was the mayor of Osh, Kyrgyzstan's second largest city, from 26 January 2009 until 5 December 2013. Myrzakmatov is known for being a radical nationalist leader and openly bearing an ethnic Kyrgyz-first policy. He is also widely believed to be involved in organized crime.

When Myrzakmatov was the mayor of Osh, he largely ignored the capital Bishkek in his actions. This situation did not change even after the northerner Almazbek Atambayev was elected president in December 2011. Senior members of Atambayev's administration expressed "dismay at tensions in the south but say they have no way of influencing the situation there."

On 5 December 2013, the Prime Minister of Kyrgyzstan, Zhantoro Satybaldiyev, issued a decree and dismissed Myrzakmatov from his post as mayor of Osh. Despite being dismissed, Myrzakmatov was allowed to take part in a new mayoral election that was held on January 15, 2014. He was defeated by pro-presidential candidate Aitmamat Kadyrbaev. Both Myrzakmatov's dismissal and his defeat in the election provoked mass protests by his supporters.

In 2015, the Osh City Court found him guilty of abuse of power and corruption and sentenced him to seven years in prison in absentia. Following the 2020 Kyrgyzstan protests, Myrzakmatov, who had spent his time in exile in Turkey, returned to Kyrgyzstan.

== Personal life ==
Melis Jooshbayevich Myrzakmatov was born on April 18, 1969, in the village of Papan in Osh Province, Kyrgyz SSR. Myrzakmatov is married to Nurgul Myrzakmatova. They have four daughters and one son.

== Nationalist mayor of Osh ==
Myrzakmatov, an ethnic Kyrgyz, is known for being a nationalist. Most of his supporters are southern ethnic Kyrgyz. After the 2010 South Kyrgyzstan riots, Myrzakmatov emerged as a strong leader and has been widely supported by Kyrgyz nationalists. Some have even blamed Myrzakmatov of instigating the interethnic riots.

Bishkek unsuccessfully tried to remove Myrzakmatov from office several times. On August 20, 2010, thousands of Kyrgyz people rallied near Osh to show their support for the mayor, who had not been heard from since attending talks with the interim government. Myrzakmatov appeared to reassure people that he had not been sacked. Azimbek Beknazarov, the country's deputy leader, also appeared before the crowd to ameliorate fears that Myrzakmatov had been fired, saying that he had been offered other posts in the interim government, but had refused.

On 5 December 2013, the Prime Minister of Kyrgyzstan Zhantoro Satybaldiyev issued a decree and dismissed Myrzakmatov from his post as mayor of Osh. Despite being dismissed, Myrzakmatov was allowed to take part in a new mayoral election that was held on January 15, 2014. However, he was defeated by pro-presidential candidate Aitmamat Kadyrbaev. Both Myrzakmatov's dismissal and his defeat in the election provoked mass protests by his supporters.

== Myrzakmatov's book on the 2010 South Kyrgyzstan riots ==
In late 2011 Myrzakmatov published a book entitled In Search of the Truth. The Osh Tragedy: Documents, Facts, Interviews, Appeals, and Declarations (Russian: В поисках истины. Ошская трагедия: документы,факты, интервью, обращения и заявления) — both in Kyrgyz and Russian — in which he presented his own version of the June events. In the book he took a radical anti-Uzbek approach and portrayed Uzbeks as a separatist group and "stressed the need for non-Kyrgyz ethnic groups to understand their future role would be as subordinates."

In his book Myrzakmatov gives a dubious account of the events in Southern Kyrgyzstan. "Many details are questionable, and key events are missing. There is little reference to attacks on Uzbek districts, and no discussion of casualties in Uzbek areas." Myrzakmatov claimed that the Kyrgyz were caught off-guard by an attack of Uzbeks who were "armed to the teeth" but the attack was thwarted by Myrzakmatov and a few other similar "heroic" ethnic Kyrgyz who were inspired by Manas, a hero of a Kyrgyz legend.

== International Crisis Group report ==
On March 29, 2012, the anti-conflict non-governmental organization International Crisis Group published a report which stated "discrimination and anger are pushing ethnic Uzbeks in southern Kyrgyzstan to the breaking point and the radical nationalist mayor of Osh city (Myrzakmatov) is largely to blame." The report noted that the superficial silence at the time in the south was not a sign of success. Paul Quinn-Judge, the ICG Central Asia Project Director, wrote:

Uzbeks are increasingly withdrawing into themselves. They say they are marginalized by the Kyrgyz majority, forced out of public life and the professions. Most Uzbek-language media have been closed, and prominent nationalists often refer to Uzbeks as a diaspora, emphasizing their separate and subordinate status.

The ICG report noted that unless systematic measures were taken further violence might erupt and even the most determined ethnic nationalist like Myrzakmatov was unlikely to keep the Uzbek minority silenced forever.

== See also ==
- 2010 South Kyrgyzstan riots
- 2020 Kyrgyzstan protests
