= Community Security Initiative =

OSCE Community Security Initiative

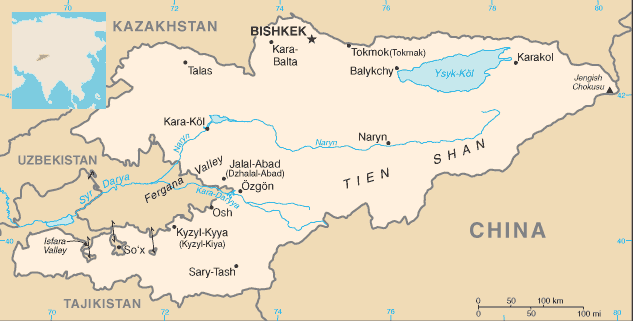
- Abbreviation: CSI
- Formation: 18 November 2010
- Dissolved: 11 December 2015
- Region served: Kyrgyzstan
- Parent organization: Organization for Security and Co-operation in Europe, OSCE Programme Office in Bishkek
- Website: https://www.osce.org/bishkek/106312

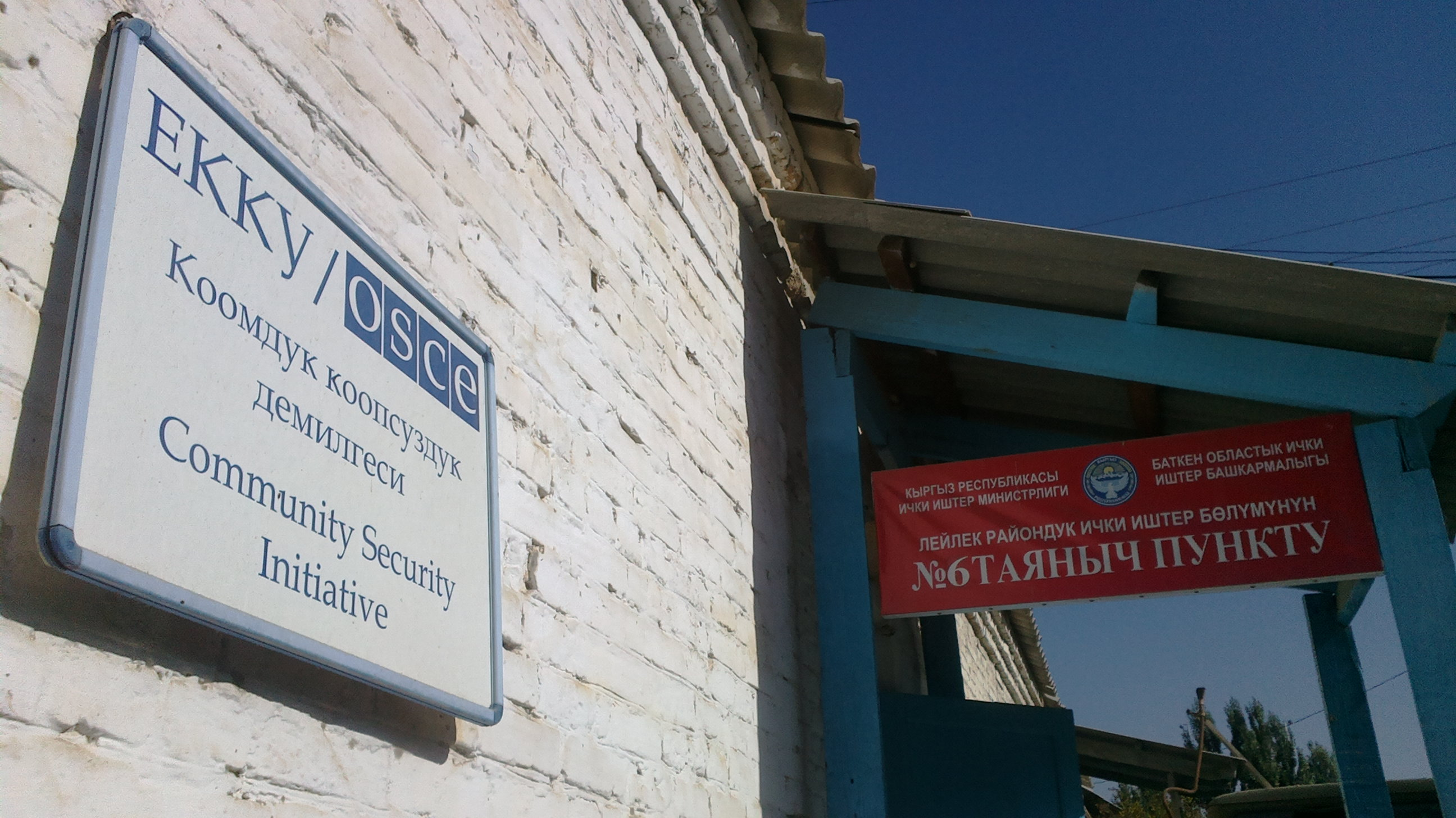
The office of the CSI project in Isfana

The Community Security Initiative (CSI) (Russian: Инициатива общественной безопасности) was a project of the OSCE in Kyrgyzstan that aimed to help the country's police in their activities. The project was established following the 2010 South Kyrgyzstan ethnic clashes. The main objective of the CSI was "to increase the respect for and protection of human rights by the police and to build confidence between law enforcement agencies and communities including through the promotion of multi-ethnic policing."

The CSI was approved in November 2010 by all OSCE participating states. The project was officially ended on 11 December 2015.

== History ==
The Community Security Initiative was developed at the request of the government of Kyrgyzstan and approved by a decision of the OSCE Permanent Council on 18 November 2010. The main goal of the project was to support Kyrgyzstan's police in dealing with the security situation following the 2010 South Kyrgyzstan ethnic clashes and to assist in the police reform process.

In the autumn of 2014, the government of Kyrgyzstan decided to close the CSI project. However, it was extended for another year. The CSI was officially closed on 11 December 2015.

=== Head ===
Markus Mueller of Switzerland (2010-2013), Todor Staykov of Bulgaria (2013-2014), Robin Seaword of the UK (2014), and Patrick McNulty of the US (2015) served as head of the CSI.

== Activities ==
As part of the project, the OSCE sent unarmed police advisers to several districts across Kyrgyzstan and donated 18 mobile police receptions—minivans with basic equipment needed for a mobile police reception—to re-establish and increase police presence in remote areas. In 2011–2015, over 80,000 people approached the mobile police receptions.

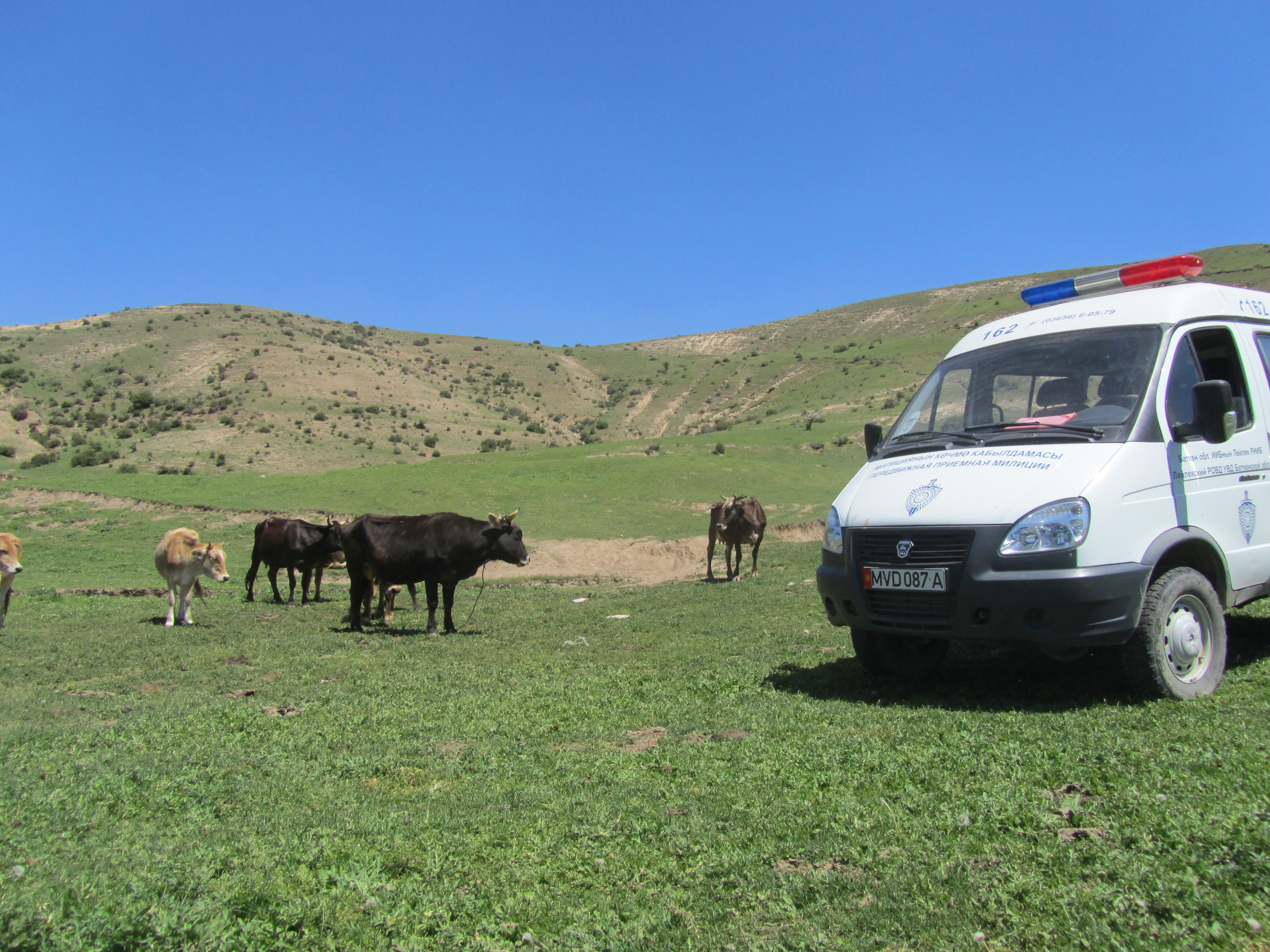
A mobile police reception in Leilek District

The CSI project also organized over 150 trainings for police officers to improve their professionalism. In addition, the CSI closely monitored and supported the activities of local crime prevention centers and neighborhood inspectors to increase their efficiency in addressing security issues and everyday concerns of citizens. The CSI also promoted youth empowerment and education by providing opportunities for young people to learn about school bullying and racketeering, as well as ethnic tolerance, career building, and prevention of bad habits.

The project worked in collaboration with the OSCE's Police Reform Programme and High Commissioner on National Minorities (HCNM). The project also collaborated with a large number of national authorities in Kyrgyzstan, including the Ombudsman, Prosecutor General, the State Penitentiary Service, the Ministry of Interior, the Ministry of Justice, and the Ministry of Health.

The CSI received €7 million worth of financing from the European Union and 21 OSCE participating states, including Andorra, Austria, Belgium, Canada, Denmark, Finland, France, Germany, Hungary, Ireland, Kazakhstan, Liechtenstein, Lithuania, Luxembourg, Norway, Sweden, Switzerland, Turkey, the United Kingdom and the United States.

== Areas of operation ==
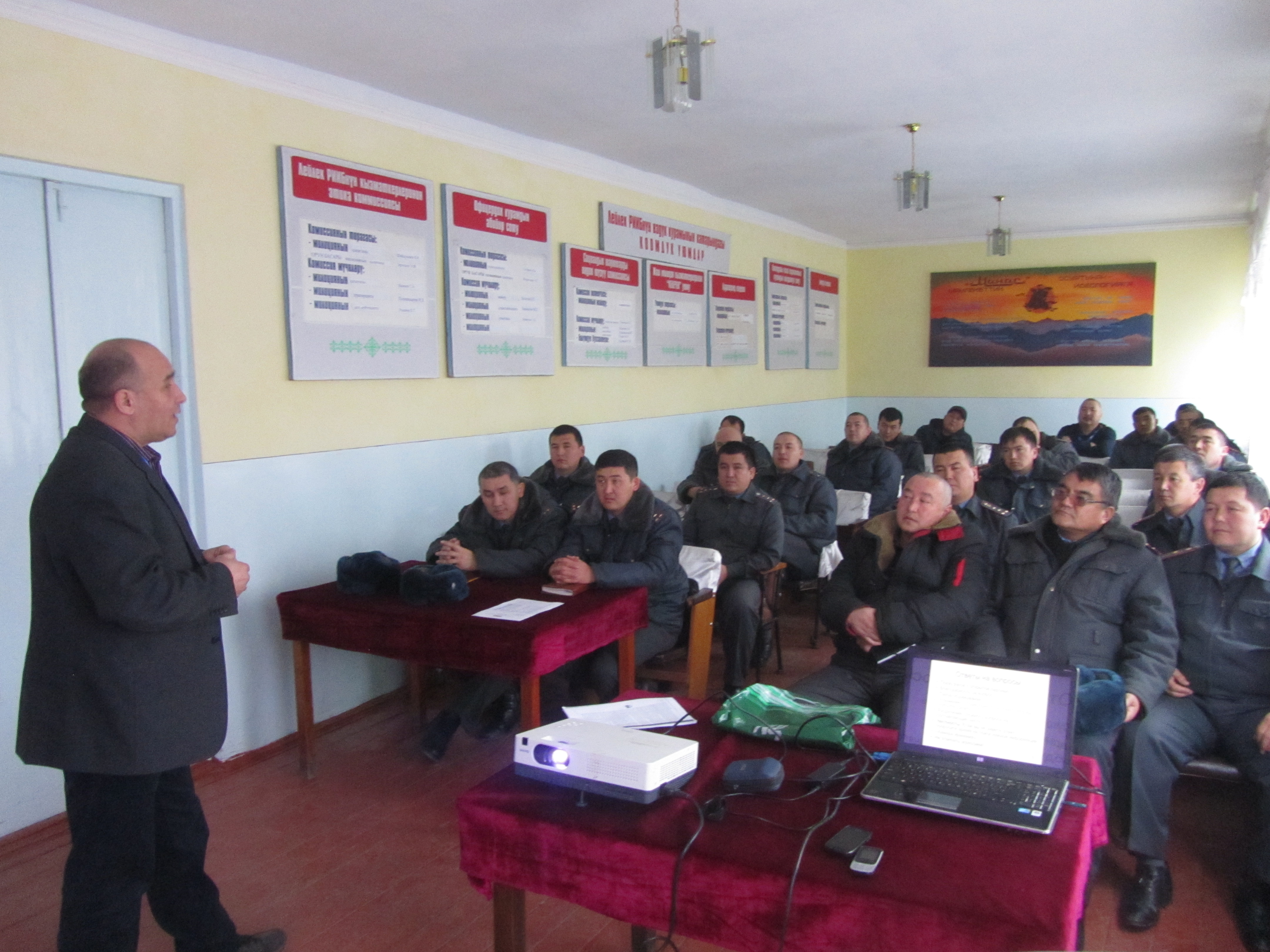
A group of police officers attend a lecture on effective public speaking in Isfana.

The CSI was present in the following districts and cities across Kyrgyzstan:

Batken Region

- Batken District
- Leilek District
- Kyzyl-Kiya City

Chuy Region

- Chuy District
- Jayyl District

Jalal-Abad Region

- Bazar-Korgon District
- Nooken District
- Suzak District
- Toguz-Toro District
- Jalal-Abad City

Osh Region

- Aravan District
- Kara-Suu District
- Nookat District
- Uzgen District
- Osh City
