= Corruption in Kyrgyzstan =

Corruption in Kyrgyzstan has worsened in recent years. Despite having a strong legal framework on paper, there remains a huge gulf in Kyrgyzstan between the law and its implementation. Kyrgyzstan’s rampant corruption which penetrates all levels of society, including the presidency, eventually caused the Tulip Revolution in 2005, overthrowing Askar Akayev, and the 2010 Kyrgyzstani revolution, ousting Kurmanbek Bakiyev from office.

Corruption has become an integral part of the governance mechanism in Kyrgyzstan. Corruption is a large and significant problem that poses the main threat to the country's national security, socio-economic development, the well-being of society and the people and affects the functioning of state authorities, judicial authorities, law enforcement agencies, the penal system, local government bodies, health systems and education in Kyrgyzstan.

According to modern Kyrgyz legislation, corruption is a deliberate act consisting in the creation of an unlawful stable connection of one or more officials with powers of authority with individuals or groups in order to illegally obtain material, any other benefits and advantages, as well as their provision of these benefits and advantages. individuals and legal entities that pose a threat to the interests of society or the state.

There are laws aimed at preventing corruption, but their implementation is very weak. The low level of prosecution of corrupt officials is another factor contributing to the rampant corruption in Kyrgyzstan. It is not a criminal offense for a non-public official to influence the decision of a public official. The Kyrgyz judiciary is facing a serious functional deficit due to limited resources and judicial corruption.

In Kyrgyzstan, corruption is present at almost all levels of society, business and government. Notable among Kyrgyzstan's large reserves of gold and coal is the largest gold deposit in Central Asia, Kumtor. Although the state budget receives only a small part of taxes and payments from Kumtor, the mine contributed to many corruption scandals and allegations of corruption among the country's top officials).

"Bribery among low and mid-level officials is part of everyday life and sometimes even transparent," says Freedom House, adding that widespread corruption helps "limit equality of opportunity."

Local authorities and militia in the south of Kyrgyzstan are characterized by a high level of corruption and intolerance towards Uzbeks. The June crisis deprived state institutions of that small trust from the Uzbek diaspora, which was in short supply before the crisis. Corruption of local authorities and militia in the south of Kyrgyzstan contributed greatly to the June 2010 events.

At one time, even Akayev admitted that crime and corruption have firmly settled on the seventh floor of the White House (there are the offices of the president and the prime minister). This statement has not lost its relevance under Bakiyev. Thus, according to the lists of his Ak Zhol party, in 2007, one of the leaders of the southern organized criminal group, Sanzhar Kadyraliev, entered parliament, later shot dead in his office deputy car. Other leaders of organized criminal groups, Iskender Matraimov, Bayaman Erkinbaev, Rysbek Akmatbaev, Omurbek Bakirov, Ulan Cholponbaev, Bakytbek Zhetigenov, Altynbek Sulaimanov, were also elected to the country's parliament.

== History ==
=== The USSR ===
Corruption in Kyrgyzstan originated as part of the Corruption in the Soviet Union.

At first, bribery in Soviet Kyrgyzstan was recognized as counter-revolutionary activity, and the 1922 Criminal Code provided for execution for this crime. Despite the toughness of criminal norms, corruption continued to exist in the USSR as well in the judicial system and law enforcement agencies.

Thus, at the expense of the union center, there was a further economic strengthening of the lowest level of the state as a corporation - an enterprise, and the cash flows that the directors could control significantly increased.

A fictitious economy arose and operated, which did not create goods, but the wind of which blew the sails of illegal business well and made it possible to feed well those who were "at the helm of power" not only administrative, but, above all, economic. This includes the production of surplus, low-quality and counterfeit products; inflationary and speculative price increases. The additions to the fulfillment of the plan are especially indicative. All this served the appropriation of surplus value by private individuals, one way or another involved in production.

As KGB General A.G. Sidorenko recalls, Andropov more than once sent Brezhnev operational materials about the extortion of some party leaders, but usually they returned with a note: "Reported, destroy."

By the beginning of the perestroika, “their own people” in the state (and perhaps in the party) structures had not only domestic “shadow” companies, but also foreign capital, which in this way also had the opportunity to influence the policy of the Soviet state.

The law on cooperation, adopted in 1989, laid the foundation for the legalization of underground workshops and the privatization of state property.

“If in 1986 the right to direct export and import activities was experimentally granted to a limited circle of enterprises and organizations,” it was noted on the pages of Izvestia of the Central Committee of the CPSU, “since April 1, 1989, practically all Soviet state and cooperative enterprises, other organizations received the right to directly export their own products and buy goods for the money earned to develop production and meet the needs of their work collectives. "

Thus, already in 1986 - 1987. the transfer of Soviet money (including, and perhaps above all, government and party money) abroad begins. There they were converted into dollars, pounds, marks, etc., which made it possible to avoid their depreciation under the influence of "shock therapy", and then, after 1991, to return to Kyrgyzstan and other former Soviet republics.

In the USSR, until the early 1980s, the topic of corruption was not openly raised. The fact that from the mid-1950s to 1986, bribery registered in criminal practice increased 25 times, Soviet citizens were not informed ...

The number of officials in the Soviet Union per 1000 inhabitants: in 1922 there were 5.2; in 1928 - 6.9; in 1940 - 9.5; in 1950 - 10.2; in 1985 - 8.7

== In modern Kyrgyzstan ==
=== 1992-2000 ===
An important role in the spread of corruption in post-Soviet Kyrgyzstan was the bankruptcy of successfully operating state-owned enterprises and factories and their further privatization at the residual, symbolic value by those in power. Which, due to the theft of state property, have officially turned into dollar multimillionaires. In the future, the privatization of agricultural land assigned large allotments of land to the newly appeared corrupt officials. In such a criminal way, the people in Kyrgyzstan were deprived of public property, created by the labor of several generations of the people, and which passed into the private property of state officials in power. The initial accumulation of capital through appropriation for the symbolic value of state property contributed to the fact that people with a criminal past aspired to power in Kyrgyzstan. As a result, about 30 percent of the country's people live below the poverty line, and Kyrgyzstan is among the ten poorest countries in the world.

Total corruption contributes to a large flow of smuggling,

In 1998, Doctor of Law N.I. Matuzov noted that "the privileges, abuses, corruption of modern bosses have acquired such forms and scales that even the party officials of the Soviet period did not dream of."

In the book "Goal number one" Mikhail Antonov and the head of the legal department of the Presidential Administration of the Kyrgyz Republic Marat Ukushov assessed corruption in Kyrgyzstan as "total".

At the beginning of 2019, A. Sharshenbayev, an employee of the Transparency International Kyrgyzstan center, stated that Kyrgyzstan is one of the ten most corrupt countries in the world and that corruption is one of the most destructive forces in the Kyrgyz state.

In the National Strategy for Sustainable Development of the Kyrgyz Republic for the period 2013-2017, it was noted that the system of government and business in Kyrgyzstan is saturated with corruption and criminal business, the criminalization of certain state structures. The state of the law enforcement and law enforcement systems indicates that they are unable to resist corruption, since they themselves are often the subject of it.

=== From the year 2000 ===
In 2025, Transparency International evaluated Kyrgyzstan in relation to 182 other countries in its Corruption Perceptions Index, where countries are scored on a scale of 0 to 100: 0 signifies a perception of a very corrupt public sector, and 100 a perception of a very honest public sector. The lowest and highest scores worldwide in 2024 were 9 and 89, with an average score of 42. Kyrgyzstan's score was 26. Transparency International also compared Kyrgyzstan to eighteen other countries of the Europe and Central Asia region, (Note: Albania, Armenia, Azerbaijan, Belarus, Bosnia and Herzegovina, Georgia, Kazakhstan, Kosovo, Kyrgyzstan, Moldova, Montenegro, North Macedonia, Russia, Serbia, Tajikistan, Turkey, Turkmenistan, Ukraine, Uzbekistan) which collectively scored between 17 and 50, with an average of 34. Citing the fall of Kyrgyzstan's score from 31 in 2020 to 26 in 2023, Transparency International wrote, "In just four years, Kyrgyzstan (26) has turned from a bastion of democracy with a vibrant civil society to a consolidated authoritarian regime that uses its justice system to target critics."

During 2022 the government used the Protection from False Information Law to block access to several news websites. Transparency International reported that in 2021 Kyrgyzstan used the COVID-19 pandemic as an excuse to suppress journalism and public assemblies, and that the disposition of COVID-19 relief funds had been concealed.

Experts note that the turnover of the shadow economy is estimated at an average of 60% of the country's GDP, which is about 130 billion soms, since corruption is one of the ways to avoid the established system of taxation and state reporting. It is known that through corruption there is a redistribution of income in favor of certain corporate and social groups at the expense of the most vulnerable segments of the population who are unable to resist extortion and other corruption abuses.

At the same time, some analysts argue that there is no fight against corruption in Kyrgyzstan, arrests of middle-level officials do not violate the bribery system, and no anti-corruption policy has been developed.

One of the entrenched forms of corruption in modern Kyrgyzstan is the employment of relatives of officials of all ranks in structures with a high level of income, which can be considered as payment for their loyalty to the “adopters” and their structures. Relatives often become cover for business and property of officials by rewriting ownership. The press noted cases of such suspicion. In particular, the wives of the Matraimov brothers.

== History and cases ==
=== Akayev administration ===
In 2005, after the revolution that overthrew President Akayev, a commission was set up to investigate his business assets; the tentative list was for 42 businesses inclusive of the Kumtor Gold Mine. As early as 2002, Akayev and his son Aydar were alleged to have received $2 million in lease payments, along with other payments, totalling $119 million through his two airport service companies. However, investigations have met with much difficulty in identifying the exact ownership of the companies.

=== Bakiyev administration ===
President Bakiyev, after his rise to the presidency in 2006, in turn appointed his son, Maxim Bakiyev, to the nation’s development agency. There were murky deals signed with the China and the transfer of assets to overseas tax havens.

=== Jeenbekov administration ===
One of the major corruption scandals that happened during the presidency of the current leader Sooronbay Jeenbekov is related to Raimbek Matraimov, a former deputy head of the State Customs Service of Kyrgyzstan. In May 2019 the Kyrgyz edition of Radio Liberty published an investigation, in which journalists claimed that Matraimov earned significant wealth while being part of a corruption scheme during his work as the customs official from 2015 to 2017. According to the investigation, Matraimov allowed a group of Chinese companies led by the secretive Abdukadyr family bring goods into Kyrgyzstan without paying any customs fees.

One of the sources of the investigation, a self-confessed money launderer Aierken Saimaiti who worked for Abdukadyrs, was murdered in Istanbul in November 2019.

Although Matraimov denied any links with the murder of Saimaiti, the next part of the journalism investigation about him, heavily based on interviews with Saimaiti, was published on November 21, 2019, ten days after the assassination of Saimaiti. This time it was a joint investigation by Radio Liberty, OCCRP and Kloop, a Kyrgyz media outlet, and it revealed more details about the corruption schemes at the Kyrgyz customs service.

According to November investigations, Matraimov not only backed illegal activities of the Abdukadyr family business, but got involved in at least one joint real estate project with them: Matraimov's wife Uulkan Turgunova was revealed to be a co-owner of an estate in Dubai together with one of the Abdukadyr family members. Neither Matraimov, nor his wife have ever had an official salary that would allow them to invest into such an expensive project.

=== Judicial system ===
The judicial system is viewed with strong distrust by the population. The courts under President Akaev were used to suppress the opposition, and under President Bakiyev, the courts continued the same purpose, deregistering credible opposition parties for the 2007 elections. There was widespread protest about the supreme court decision to close the case involving the police killing 6 people in Aksy district in March 2001, when President Bakiyev was then Prime Minister. The frustration with the endemic corruption in the judicial system has even provoked some set up an individual system of law enforcement. In 2000, a survey was conducted with 2100 respondents holding the view that the judicial institution was the 2nd most corrupt organization, and 83% of respondents holding the view that corruption was rife there.

== 2011 amendment of hajj law ==
The Kyrgyzstan parliament made changes to its laws to prevent the officials profiting from the corrupt distribution of hajj pilgrimage places allocated to the country by Saudi Arabia. Officials have been accused of selling or distributing them to their relatives and friends instead of fairly allocating the quota.

== Anti-corruption efforts ==
Anti-Corruption legislation includes the Criminal Code of Kyrgyzstan which criminalises the major forms of corrupt activity, including passive bribery, attempted corruption, extortion, money laundering and abuse of office.

A number of organizations like the Anti-Corruption Business Council and the NGO, Citizens Against Corruption, have been set up to tackle the endemic corruption besetting the country. The government launched a new anticorruption website in March 2011 with the promise that the government, Prosecutor-General office and the police will check every case. though many have remain sceptical on the usefulness of the website

== Analysis of corruption in the country ==
The Swedish political scientist Johan Engvall in his study "Corruption is the whole of Kyrgyzstan. The state as an investment market: an analytical basis for understanding politics and bureaucracy in Kyrgyzstan" wrote: The entire state called Kyrgyzstan can be imagined as a market where government offices are sold and bought. The culmination of the disintegration of the state was the almost official symbiosis between law enforcement and organized crime, nurtured by former President Bakiyev. In his dissertation, Dr. J. Engvall cites figures presented by various sources of information and referring to different periods of the history of independent Kyrgyzstan. According to his interlocutors, in Akaev's times, the post of minister could cost from one hundred to two hundred thousand dollars. To become a governor, one had to pay more than 40 thousand dollars, and akim (head of the city administration) - from 20 thousand dollars. In February 2011, according to a former judge and deputy minister, a judge's seat in the court of first instance in Bishkek had to pay between $ 10,000 and $ 50,000.

== Corruption in local government ==
After the expansion of powers, decentralization and the transfer of many functions directly to local self-government bodies, the local government has become one of the main corruption feeding troughs in Kyrgyzstan. The heads of local governments were endowed with administrative, control and administrative powers, which they used for personal enrichment. As a result of decentralization, the collection of all types of taxes and payments passed to the introduction of local authorities. Local authorities formed the local budget. Considerable funds from the local budget were directed to dubious projects for which controversial tenders were held, kickbacks for them amounted to 30-40% of the tender amount. Other corrupt components of local authorities were the allocation of land plots for the construction of individual housing, which took place for large bribes, the allocation of municipal property for rent and sale to private ownership, construction permits, and the transfer of objects to non-residential fund. Abuse of office among local officials has reached rampant proportions, as reported by the country's attorney general

During the reign of the head of the Kyzyl-Kyshtak ayil okmotu Sharabidin Kaparov, he was recognized as the most corrupt official in Kyrgyzstan.

During this period, crimes were recorded in the field of land fraud, illegal transfer of state social facilities (in particular, the territory of schools, baths in the village of Kyzyl-Bayrak, part of the Toloykon hospital) into private ownership.

Sharabidin Kaparov, using forged documents, issued a strategic object of state importance - the Western airport of Osh, as private property, which was later destroyed by a social object - a bathhouse in the village of Kyzyl-Bayrak in the name of his father. He handed over to his relatives the building of a 4-storey educational building of the Osh state farm-technical school for the illegal organization of a gambling brothel.

Sh. Kaparov carried out illegal capital construction on agricultural irrigated lands and the security zone of the Western (reserve) airport of Osh city, transfer of municipal property and municipal land with hundreds of times lower than the real market price and causing especially large material damage to state interests, illegally registered as private property whole streets in the settlements of the village of Suratash, land plots were allocated for the construction of housing for large bribes, misappropriation of budget funds by overstating the cost estimate and the amount of work. Sh. Kaparov did not hesitate to appropriate budgetary funds allocated for children, low-income families and disabled people.

In order to prosecute the corrupt official Sharabidin Kaparov, the residents of the council had to complain in writing to the President of Russia V.V. Putin, organized processions with banners to the capital, went to numerous rallies, staged acts of self-immolation. Sh. Kaparov persecuted and threatened to kill the activists.

== Corruption at customs, smuggling, drug supply ==
The economic and corruption basis for corrupt officials in Kyrgyzstan was the customs, which accounted for significant financial flows. The proximity to this resource also led to the allocation of some "clans" in the country, initially on the basis of party territorial associations. After the collapse of the USSR and the emergence of independent Kyrgyzstan, the "Corruption clans" turned into oligarchic groups, since the representatives of the old party nomenklatura mainly benefited from privatization.

With the collapse of the USSR, the Kyrgyz customs began to introduce gray corruption schemes, develop smuggling, control the supply of drugs from Tajikistan through Kyrgyzstan to Kazakhstan and then to Russia on a systematic basis. Corrupt leaders of law enforcement agencies controlled the Kyrgyz part of the Northern Route, the supply of Afghan drugs to Russia, China and other countries.

A large flow of smuggling from China and Turkey and further duty-free re-export of these smuggled goods to the EAEU countries caused repeated scandals among the leaderships of the EAEU countries. For example, in October 2017, Kazakhstan even closed the border with Kyrgyzstan, demanding that the Kyrgyz authorities put an end to gray smuggling. But, since the authorities of Kyrgyzstan, through the gray cardinal of the Kyrgyz customs, receive shadow income from customs and smuggling, the situation with gray smuggling is still not resolved. This plays into the hands of corrupt officials, since the smuggling of goods and the supply of drugs across the border, which they control, is the main item of the shadow incomes of corrupt officials and with part of the criminal proceeds from which they are shared with the country's leadership, and therefore corrupt officials from customs are untouchable under any government in Kyrgyzstan.

For 17 years, Kyrgyz customs have registered goods from China totaling $ 11.64 billion. At the same time, the Chinese customs considered that they had sent goods to Kyrgyzstan for $ 61.667 billion. The difference is over $ 50 billion. Thus, due to the gray schemes introduced by the Matraimov clan to the customs, the state budget of Kyrgyzstan received less than $ 10 billion. This is despite the fact that the external debt of Kyrgyzstan is $ 4.5 billion, the Government of the country is forced to borrow funds to replenish the state budget and Kyrgyzstan is one of the ten poorest countries in the world and one million Kyrgyzstanis are in forced migration due to the lack of prospects and work in their homeland. ...

For 17 years, according to the Kyrgyz customs, the volume of supplies of goods from Turkey amounted to $ 1.129 billion. According to Turkish data, goods worth $ 2.968 billion were sent. The difference is $ 1.839 billion.

Goods from the United States account for a significant share in Kyrgyzstan's imports. Official figures are close to Turkish imports. However, here, too, the US customs data differ significantly: $ 884 million versus $ 2.039 billion.

Another corruption component of the Kyrgyz customs is the smuggling of fuels and lubricants to Tajikistan. Kyrgyzstan, as a member of the EAEU, purchases from Russia large consignments of fuel and lubricants duty-free and delivers part of Russian fuel and lubricants without customs clearance to Tajikistan, where fuel and lubricants are more expensive. Payments do not go to the state budget, but go to the pockets of corrupt officials.

With the opening of the border with Uzbekistan, the smuggling of household appliances, mobile phones and consumer goods to this country was established.

Corrupt officials of the country are engaged in money laundering on an especially large scale, illegally and without declaring they withdraw gold and several billion dollars a year from Kyrgyzstan, without paying taxes and payments to the state budget.
