= List of universities in Kyrgyzstan =

This is a list of universities in Kyrgyzstan, ordered alphabetically by location.

== Chüy Region ==
- Kyrgyz International University NRZ
- Al-Tamimi Bachelor Clinical University

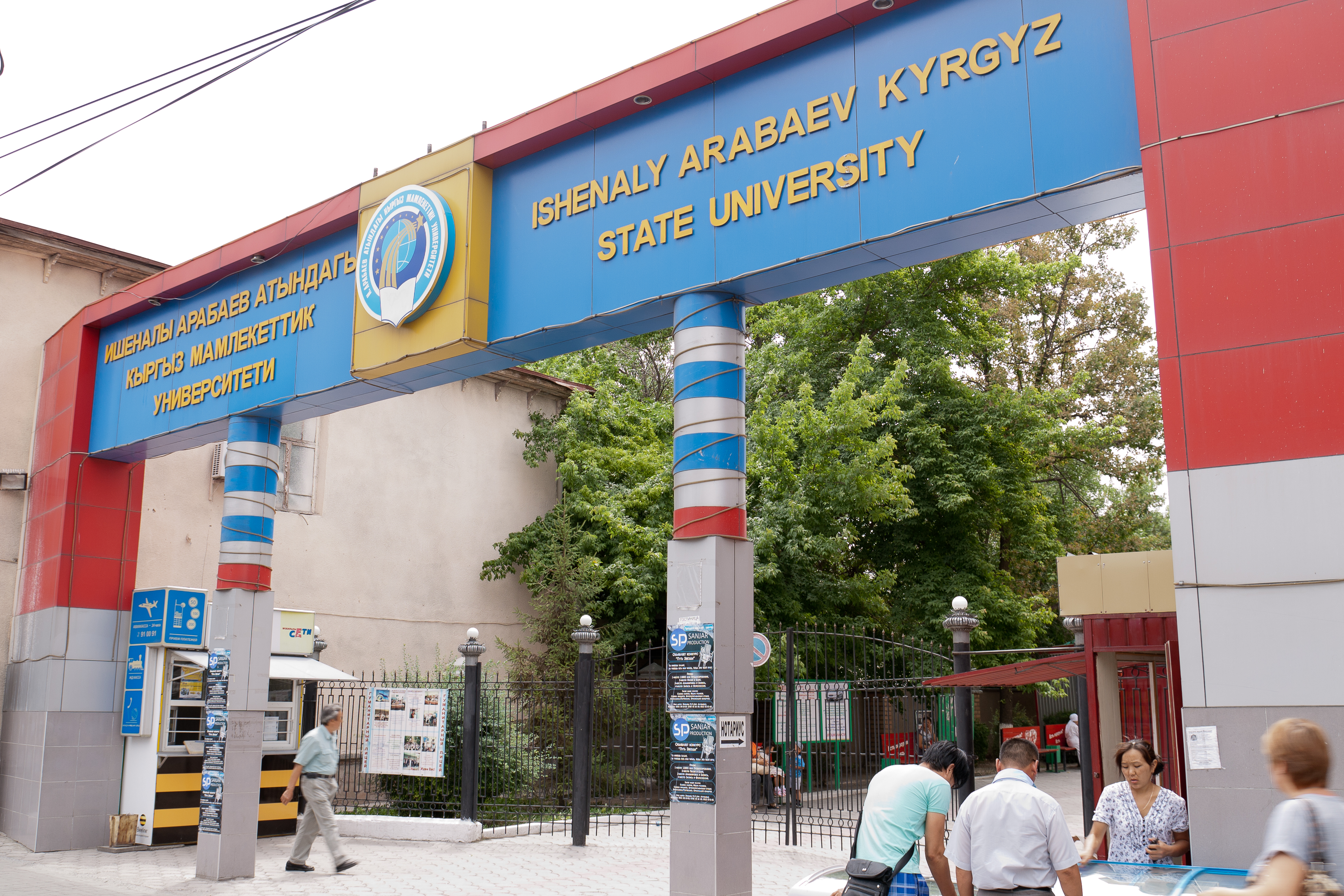
Kyrgyz State University of Arabaev (KSUA)

University of Central Asia (UCA)

- Bishkek International Medical Institute (BIMI University)
- Academy of Arts of the Kyrgyz Republic (AAKR)
- Academy of the Ministry of Internal Affairs of the Kyrgyz Republic (AIAMKR)
- International Medical University (IMU)
- Academy of Sports institute (KIPEs)
- American University of Central Asia (AUCA) (previously American University of Kyrgyzstan)
- Beyshenalieva Kyrgyz Art Institute (BKAI)
- Bishkek Humanities University
- Bishkek State Economic and Commercial Institute (BSECI)
- Filiale des Goethe Instituts
- Institute of Management, Business and Tourism (IMBT)
- International Academy of Management, Law, Finance and Business
- Ala-Too International University
- International Higher School of Medicine, International University of Kyrgyzstan Academic Consortium
- International University of Central Asia (IUCA)
- International University of Innovative Technologies
- International University of Kyrgyzstan (IUK)
- International University of Science and Business (IUSB or MUNIB)
- Eastern University named after Mahmud Kashgari Barskani
- Keiin International Institute
- Kyrgyz Academy of Agriculture (KAA)
- Kyrgyz Economic University, named after M. Ryskulbekov (KEU)
- Kyrgyz Institute of Physical Education and Sports (KIPES)
- Kyrgyz International Universal College (KIUC)
- Kyrgyz Mining and Metallurgical Institute (KMMI)
- Kyrgyz National Agrarian University (KNAU)
- Kyrgyz National Conservatory (KNC)
- Kyrgyz National University, named after Jusup Balasagyn (KNU)
- Kyrgyz-Russian Slavic University
- Medical Faculty, Kyrgyz Russian Slavic University (KRSU)
- Kyrgyz State Medical Academy (KSMA)
- Kyrgyz State University of Arabaev (KSUA)
- Kyrgyz State University of Construction, Transportation and Architecture (KSUCTA)
- Kyrgyz Technical University
- Kyrgyz University of Languages and Culture (KULC)
- Kyrgyz-Uzbek University (K-UU)
- Kyrgyz-Turkish Manas University
- Tokmok Technical University

== Issyk-Kul ==
- Issyk-Kul State University (I-KSU)

== Jalal-Abad ==
- Jalal-Abad State University
- University of Economy and Enterprise
- Modern University Of Kyrgyzstan

== Naryn ==
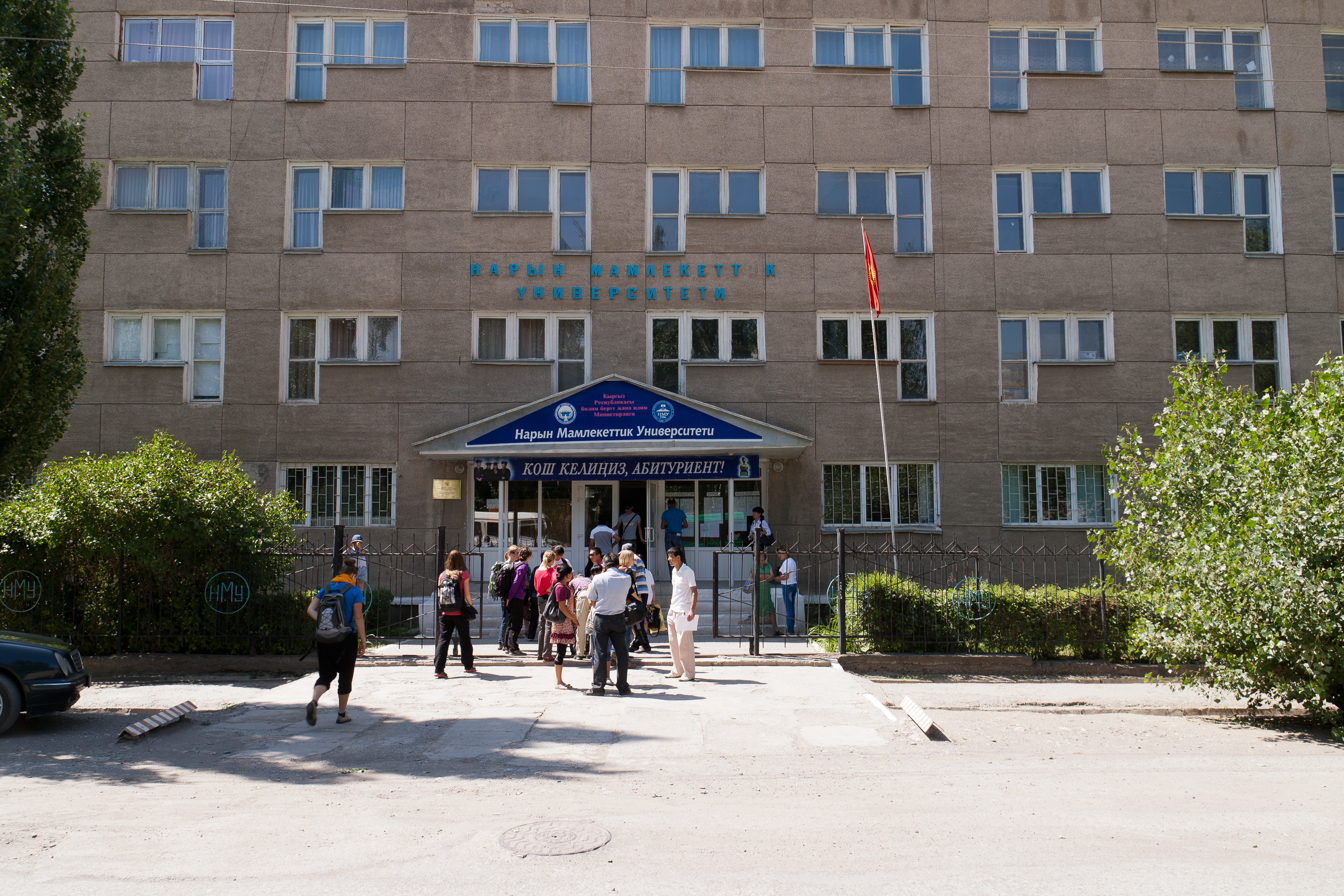
Naryn State University (NSU)

- Naryn State University (NSU)
- University of Central Asia (UCA)

== Osh ==
- International Medical Faculty, Osh State University
- Kyrgyz State Medical Institute of Postgraduate Education – south branch
- Kyrgyz-Uzbek University (KUU)
- Osh Design Institute
- Osh High College (OHC)
- Osh State University (OSU)
- Osh State University – Medical Institute
- Osh Technological University (OTU)
