= List of international presidential trips made by Sooronbay Jeenbekov =

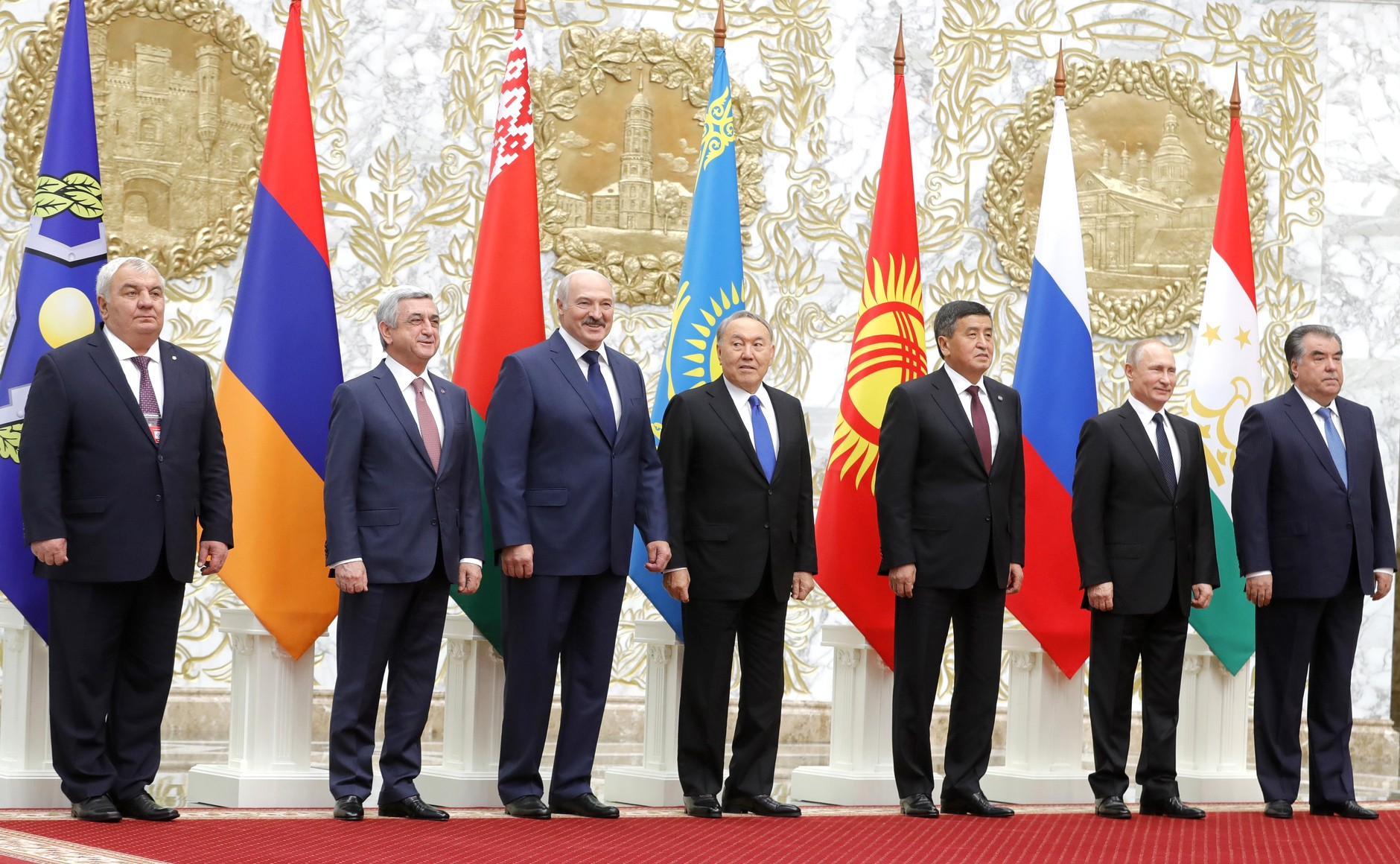
Jeenbekov with other CSTO leaders at the CSTO summit in Minsk, November 2017.

This is a list of international presidential trips made by Sooronbay Jeenbekov, the 5th President of Kyrgyzstan.

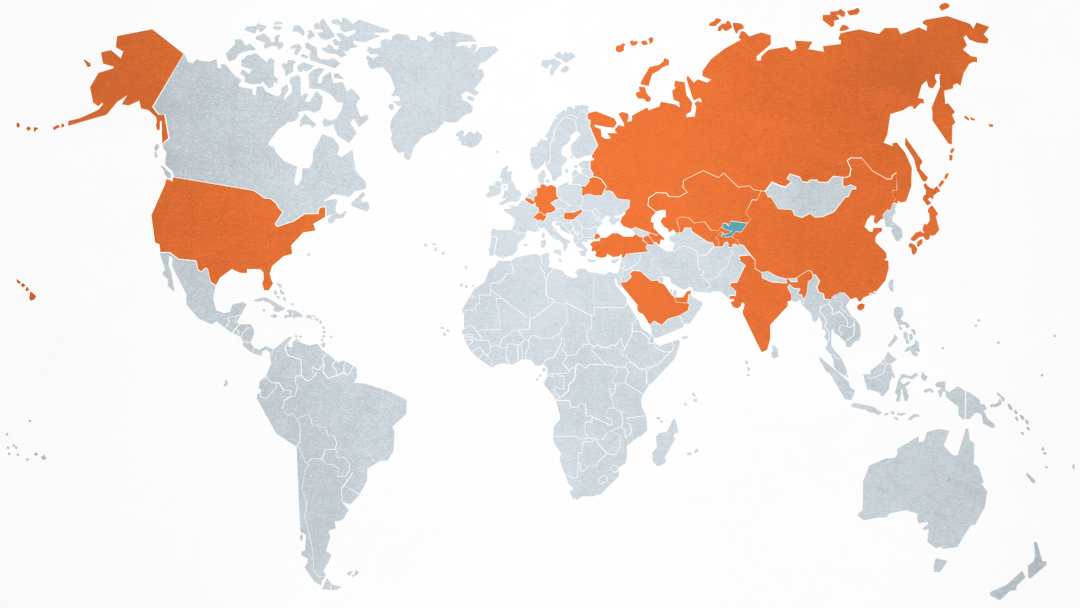
Map of countries visited by Sooronbay Jeenbekov from 2017 to 2020

== 2017 ==
Country	Areas visited	Date(s)	Notes
Russia	Moscow	November 28–29	State Visit. Met with Vladimir Putin.
Belarus	Minsk	November 29–30	Working Visit. Attended the CTSO Summit.
Uzbekistan	Tashkent	December 13	Official Visit.
Kazakhstan	Astana	December 25	State Visit.
Russia	Moscow	December 26–27	Took part in the informal summit of Heads of State of the CIS.

== 2018 ==
Country	Areas visited	Date(s)	Notes
Tajikistan	Dushanbe	February 1–2	State Visit
Kazakhstan	Astana	March 15	Working Visit. Attended a summit of the heads of five Central Asian countries.
Turkey	Ankara	April 9–10	State Visit
Belgium	Brussels	April 11–12	Working Visit
Russia	Sochi	May 14	Took part in the a summit of the Eurasian Economic Union.
China	Beijing, Qingdao	June 6–9	Took part in an annual summit of the Shanghai Cooperation Organization (SCO).
Russia	Moscow	June 14	Attended the 2018 FIFA World Cup
Turkey	Ankara	July 9	Attended the inauguration of Recep Tayyip Erdoğan
Turkmenistan	Ashgabat	August 23–24	Working Visit, Aral Sea Summit
United States	New York City	25–26 September	Attended the UN Seventy-third session of the United Nations General Assembly
Tajikistan	Dushanbe	September 27–28	Working Visit
Turkey	Istanbul	October 29	Attended the opening of Istanbul Airport during the Turkish Republic's 95th anniversary celebrations.
Kazakhstan	Astana	November 8	Attended the CSTO summit
Russia	St. Petersburg	December 6	Working Visit

== 2019 ==
Country	Areas visited	Date(s)	Notes
Russia	Sochi	February 7	Working Visit
Germany	Munich; Berlin	April 14–16	State visit
China	Beijing	April 26–28	Working visit
Kazakhstan	Nur-Sultan	May 28	Working Visit.
India	Jaipur	May 28–31	Second swearing-in ceremony of Narendra Modi.
Saudi Arabia	Mecca	May 31 – June 1	Working Visit.
Tajikistan	Dushanbe	June 15	Working visit
Switzerland	Bern	July 10	State Visit
Russia	Moscow	July 11	Working Visit
Russia	Donguz test site, Orenburg Oblast	September 20	Attended Centre 2019 strategic command-and-staff exercises
Armenia	Yerevan	October 1	Working visit
Turkmenistan	Ashgabat	October 11	Working Visit
Azerbaijan	Baku	October 14–15	Working Visit
Japan	Tokyo	October 23	Working Visit
Uzbekistan	Tashkent	November 29	Working Visit.
UAE	Abu Dhabi	December 11–15	State Visit.
Saudi Arabia	Riyadh	December 15–17	State Visit.
Russia	St. Petersburg	December 20	Working visit

== 2020 ==
Country	Areas visited	Date(s)	Notes
Russia	Moscow	February 27–28	Working Visit
Russia	Moscow	June 23	Working Visit (was due to attend the 2020 Moscow Victory Day Parade, but cut his visit short due to multiple members of his delegation having COVID-19)
Russia	Sochi	September 28	Working Visit
Hungary	Budapest	September 29	Official Visit

== Gallery of visits ==
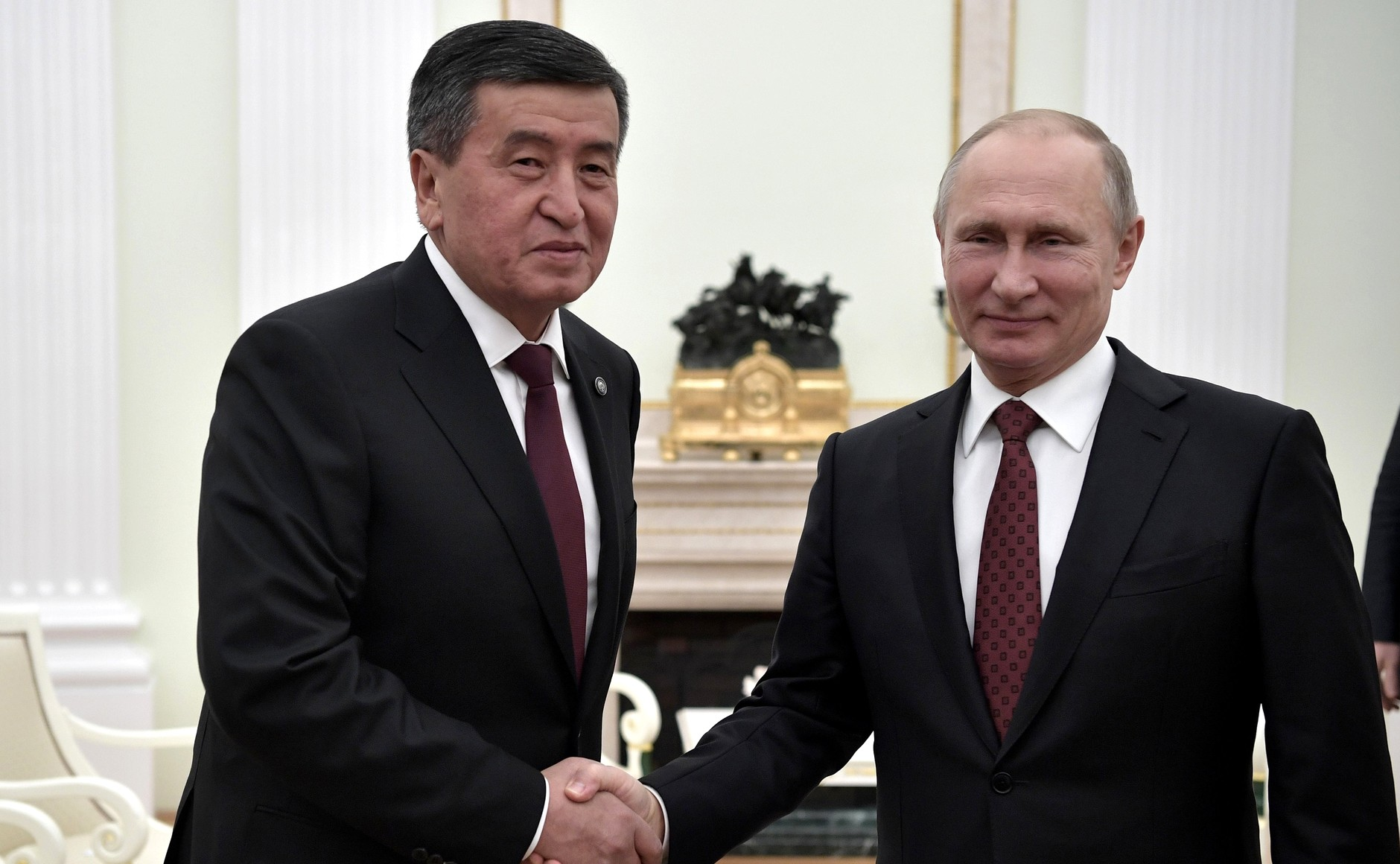
Jennbekov with Vladimir Putin in Moscow, November 2017

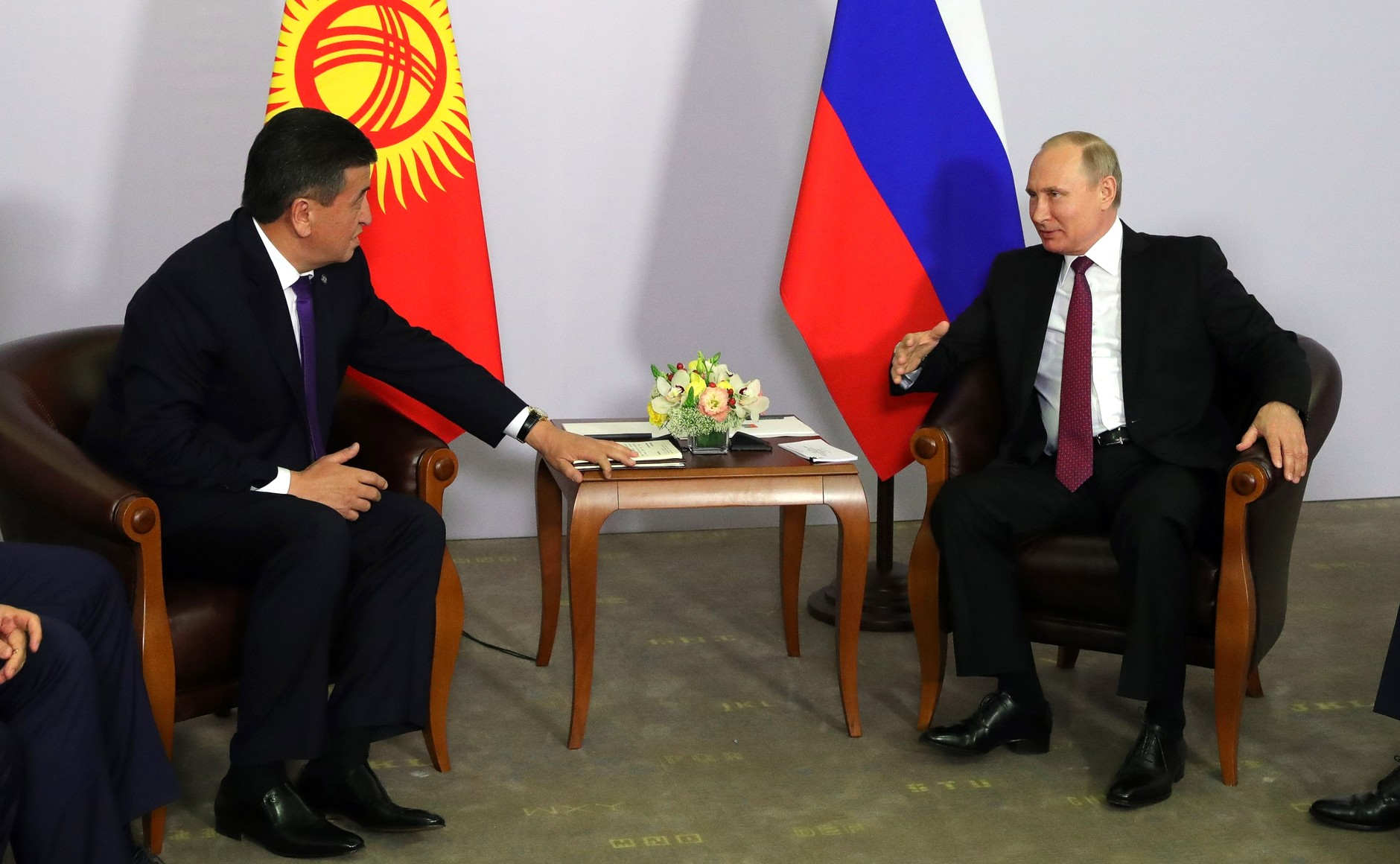
Jeenbekov with Vladimir Putin in Sochi, May 2018.

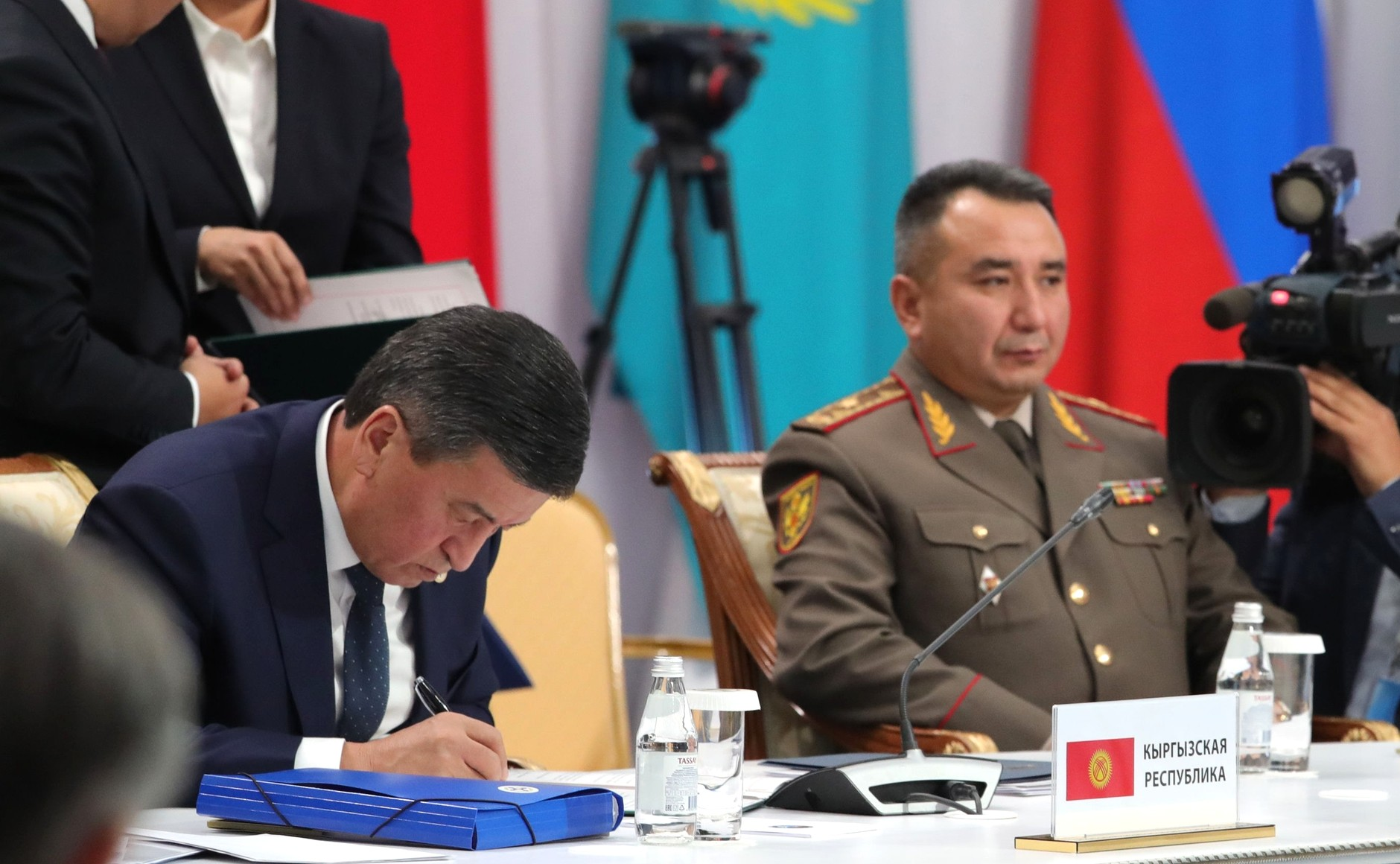
Jeenbekov with Major General Rayimberdi Duishenbiev in Astana, Kazakhstan

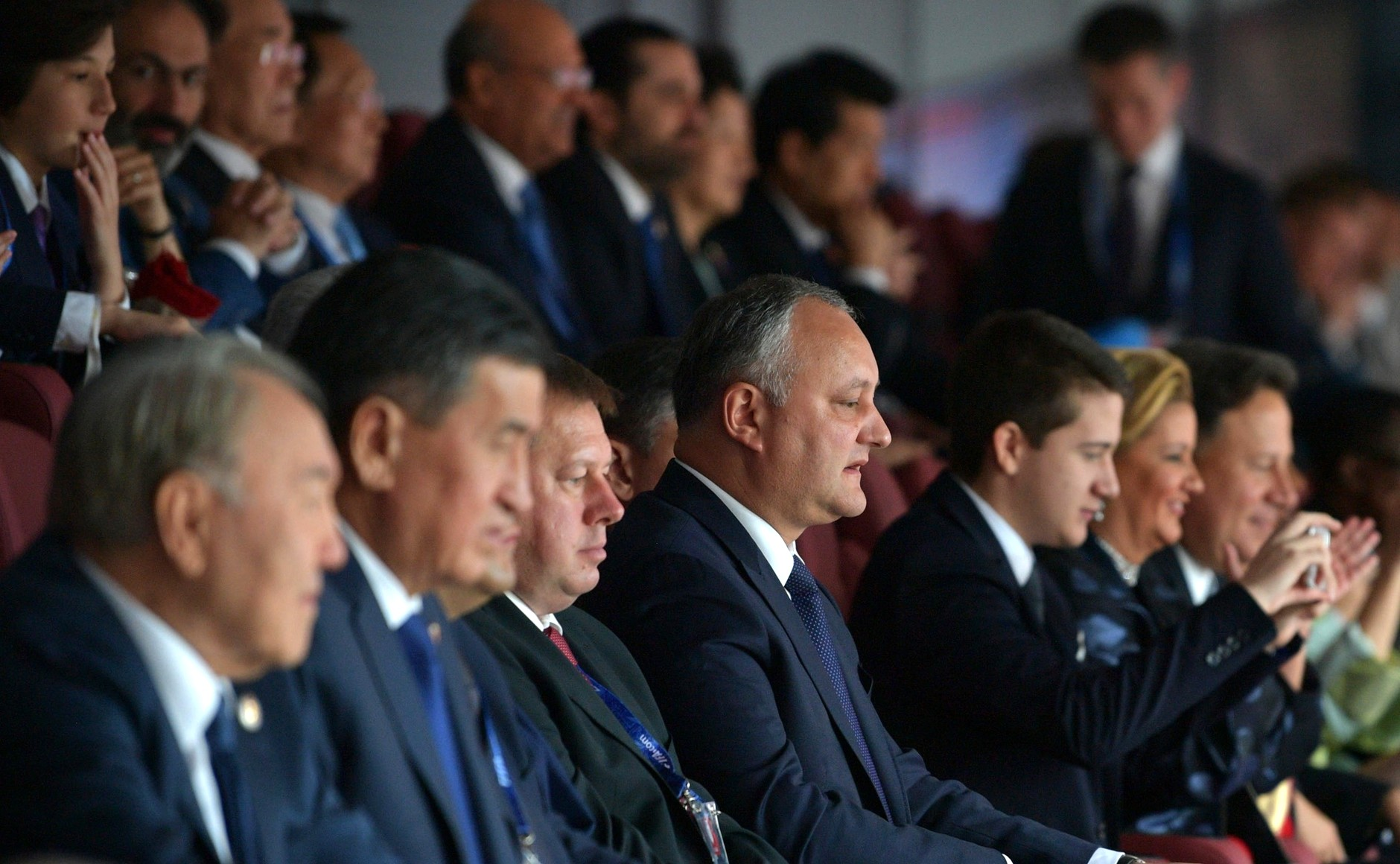
Jeenbekov with Nursultan Nazarbayev at the FIFA World Cup in Russia

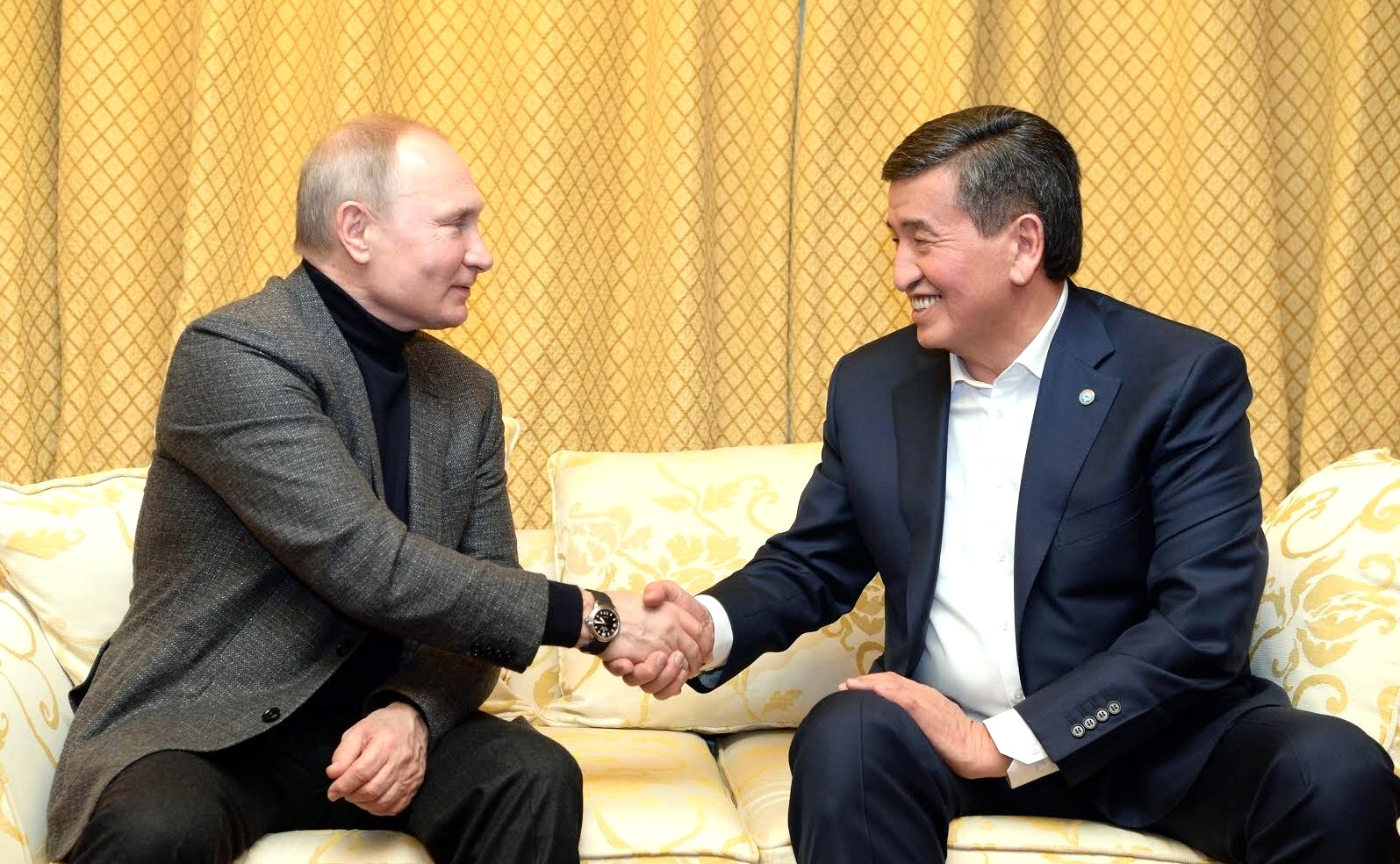
Jeenbekov with Putin in Sochi, February 2019
