= Asylbek Jeenbekov =

Kyrgyz politician (born 1963)

- Асылбек Жээнбеков
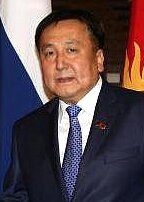
- Jeenbekov in 2013

Speaker of the Supreme Council
- In office 21 December 2011 – 13 April 2016
- Preceded by: Akhmatbek Keldibekov
- Succeeded by: Chynybai Tursunbekov

Personal details
- Born: 27 August 1963 (age 63) Biy-Myrza, Kara-Kulja District, Osh Region, Kirghiz Soviet Socialist Republic, USSR
- Party: Birimdik
- Other political affiliations: Social Democratic Party of Kyrgyzstan (2007–2019)
- Relatives: Sooronbay Jeenbekov (brother); Zhusupbek Sharipov (brother)

Asylbek Sharip uulu Jeenbekov (Kyrgyz: Асылбек Шарип уулу Жээнбеков; born 27 August 1963) is a Kyrgyz politician. He was elected the Speaker of the 5th and 6th Supreme Council of Kyrgyzstan in 2006 and 2011, respectively.

== Biography ==
He was born on 27 August 1963 in Biy-Myrza, Osh Region. In 1985 he graduated from the Kyrgyz National Agrarian University and became as agronomist at the Ak-Zhar state farm in the Özgön District. In 1987-1992, he was Junior Researcher, Senior Researcher at the Kyrgyz Experimental Station for Cotton Growing and Southern Agriculture. In 1991, he graduated from the postgraduate program of the Kyrgyz Research Institute of Agriculture.

From 1992 to 1996, he was director of Sharif LLC. From 1996 to 2002, he was director of Isken LLC. In 2002 he graduated from the University of Economics and Entrepreneurship. From 2002 to 2007, he was the General Director of Agrozoovetservis LLC and simultaneously the Chairman of the Board of Directors of the Association of Agribusinessmen of Kyrgyzstan.

He entered politics in November 2007, joining the Social Democratic Party. A month later, he contested the parliamentary election, winning a seat in the Supreme Council. He became deputy speaker on December 23, 2010. Two years later, on December 21, 2011, he was elected Speaker of the Supreme Council of the 5th convocation, replacing Akhmatbek Keldibekov, who resigned. Jeenbekov's candidacy was supported by 78 out of 120 deputies. His term ended on 13 April 2016 and was succeeded by Chynybai Tursunbekov.

== Family ==
He has a wife and six children. His brother, Sooronbay Jeenbekov, is a former Kyrgyz President and Prime Minister. His other brother, Zhusupbek Sharipov, is a former governor from Jalal-Abad and the former ambassador of Kyrgyzstan to Ukraine.

== Awards ==
- Medal for Courage during the Revolution
- Order of Commonwealth (May 19, 2016, CIS Interparliamentary Assembly)
- Medal “For Strengthening Parliamentary Cooperation” (November 28, 2013, CIS Interparliamentary Assembly)
