= Aibek Matkerimov =

Kyrgyz politician (born 1980)

- Айбек Маткеримов

Member of the Supreme Council
- Incumbent
- Assumed office 29 December 2021
- Constituency: Nationwide constituency

Chairman of the Ata-Jurt Kyrgyzstan
- Incumbent
- Assumed office 28 February 2021
- Preceded by: Zamirbek Esenamanov

Personal details
- Born: 8 November 1980 (age 45) --> Jalal-Abad, Kirghiz SSR, Soviet Union (now Manas, Kyrgyzstan
- Party: Ata-Zhurt (until 2021); Ata-Jurt Kyrgyzstan (since 2021)
- Other political affiliations: Mekenchil (2020)
- Education: Kyrgyz State Medical Academy; University of Economy and Enterprise
- Profession: Medical professional

Aibek Turatalievich Matkerimov (Kyrgyz: Айбек Тураталиевич Маткеримов; 8 November 1980) is a Kyrgyz politician and medical professional who is leader of the Ata-Jurt Kyrgyzstan party. He is currently a member of the Supreme Council of the VII convocation since 2021.

== Biography ==
Matkerimov was born in the city of Jalal-abad (now Manas) in 1980. He graduated from the Kyrgyz State Medical Academy in 2005 and later from the Kantoro Toktomamatov University of Economy and Enterprise in 2023. He began his professional career at the Postgraduate Medical Education Center in Osh as a clinical resident in 2007. From 2007 to 2011, he worked as an obstetrician-gynecologist at the city branch of the territorial hospital in Osh. He also taught at the Medical College of Osh State University from 2007 to 2012 and later at its Faculty of Medicine from 2012 to 2014.

From 2011 to 2014, Matkerimov worked at the City Hospital of Osh, serving as head of the maternity department and later as deputy chief physician. From 2014 to 2015, he was an obstetrician-gynecologist at the Jalal-Abad Regional Maternity Hospital. In 2015, he became head of the maternity department at the Suzak Territorial Hospital named after S. Zholdoshev. Between 2019 and 2020, he served as coordinator of the maternity department for Jalal-Abad Region.

=== Political career ===
Matkerimov entered politics in 2016, being elected as a deputy of the Barpi Ayil Kenesh from the Ata-Zhurt party.

He later became a candidate of the Mekenchil party list in the October 2020 parliamentary elections, which were subsequently annulled following widespread protests.

On 28 February 2021, Matkerimov became the chairman of the Ata-Jurt Kyrgyzstan party, which is closely associated with President Sadyr Japarov and the head of the State Committee for National Security, Kamchybek Tashiev. In the parliamentary elections of November 2021, he was elected from the Ata-Jurt Kyrgyzstan's party list as a deputy of the Supreme Council (7th convocation). In January 2022, he was appointed Deputy Chairman of the Committee on Social Policy.

== Personal life ==
Matkerimov is married and has a daughter.
