= Sooronbay Jeenbekov =

President of Kyrgyzstan from 2017 to 2020

- Сооронбай Жээнбеков
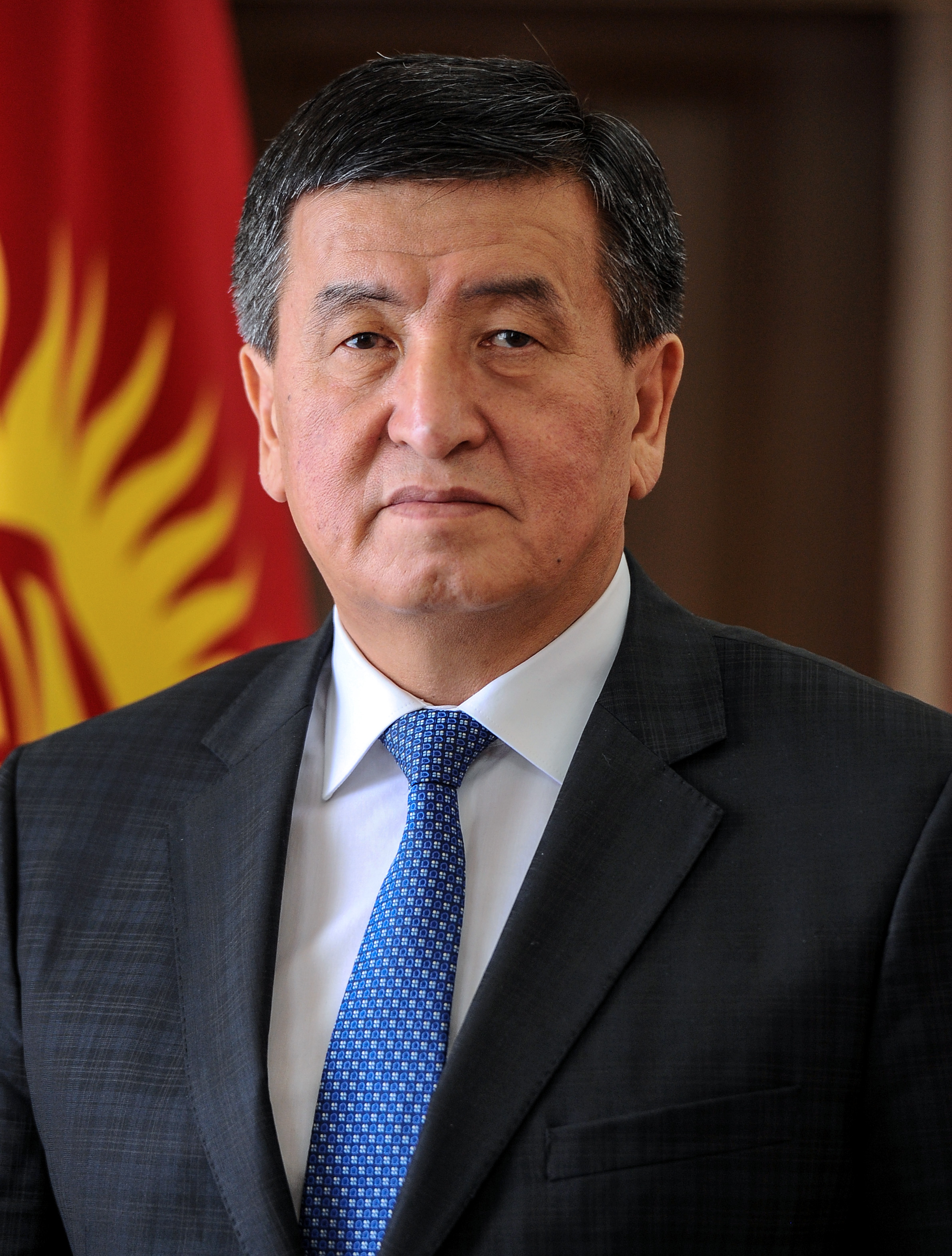
- Official portrait, 2016

5th President of Kyrgyzstan
- In office 24 November 2017 – 15 October 2020
- Prime Minister: Sapar Isakov; Mukhammedkalyi Abylgaziev; Kubatbek Boronov; Sadyr Japarov
- Preceded by: Almazbek Atambayev
- Succeeded by: Sadyr Japarov (acting)

18th Prime Minister of Kyrgyzstan
- In office 13 April 2016 – 22 August 2017
- President: Almazbek Atambayev
- Deputy: Cholpon Sultanbekova
- Preceded by: Temir Sariyev
- Succeeded by: Mukhammedkalyi Abylgaziev (acting)

Governor of Osh
- In office 16 August 2012 – 11 December 2015
- Preceded by: Aytmat Kadyrbayev
- Succeeded by: Taalaybek Sarybashev

Personal details
- Born: Sooronbay Sharipovich Jeenbekov; 16 November 1958 (age 68) Biy-Myrza, Kirghiz SSR, Soviet Union
- Party: Independent; Birimdik (affiliated)
- Other political affiliations: Social Democratic
- Spouse: Aigul Tokoyeva
- Children: 2
- Relatives: Asylbek Jeenbekov (brother); Zhusupbek Sharipov (brother)
- Education: Kyrgyz National Agrarian University

Sooronbay Sharip uulu Jeenbekov (Note: Kyrgyz: Сооронбай Шарип уулу Жээнбеков, IPA: [soːɾonˈbɑɪ ɕɑˈɾɪp uːˈɫʊ ʑeːmˈbekof]) (born 16 November 1958) is a Kyrgyz politician who served as the fifth president of Kyrgyzstan from 2017 until his resignation in 2020, following a week of protests. Prior to that he served as the 18th prime minister of Kyrgyzstan from April 2016 to August 2017.

As president, Jeenbekov dealt with issues specifically in foreign policy and corruption in which several juridical reforms were implemented to improve public trust. In spite of that, Kyrgyzstan under Jeenbekov faced a growth of organised crime and government corruption and lack of economic development which was negatively affected upon the COVID-19 pandemic and was accused of downplaying the alleged cases of electoral fraud in the 2020 parliamentary election that resulted in the 2020 Kyrgyz Revolution and his resignation amidst political unrest over the disputed election results. He was succeeded by Sadyr Japarov who would go on to serve as an acting president and prime minister for short period of time before being officially elected in the 2021 presidential elections.

Jeenbekov was widely expected to continue the policies of his predecessor, Almazbek Atambayev; however, the two fell out just months after he took office, resulting in Atambayev's arrest and the decline of his influence in Kyrgyz politics. It was planned that Atambayev becomes the de facto leader of Kyrgyzstan during the term of him.

== Early life and education ==
Jeenbekov was born in Biy-Myrza, Osh Region on 16 November 1958. His father, Sharif, was a collective farm (kolkhoz) manager while his mother was a housewife. His grandfather, Jeenbek Pirnazarov, was a Red Army soldier who served during the Great Patriotic War and was labelled as missing in action. Jeenbekov is one of nine siblings in his family, being the third eldest child. Jeenbekov attended the Kyrgyz Academy of Agriculture, graduating with a degree in zoological engineering. In 2003, he completed further studies, graduating in accounting from the Kyrgyz National Agrarian University.

== Career ==
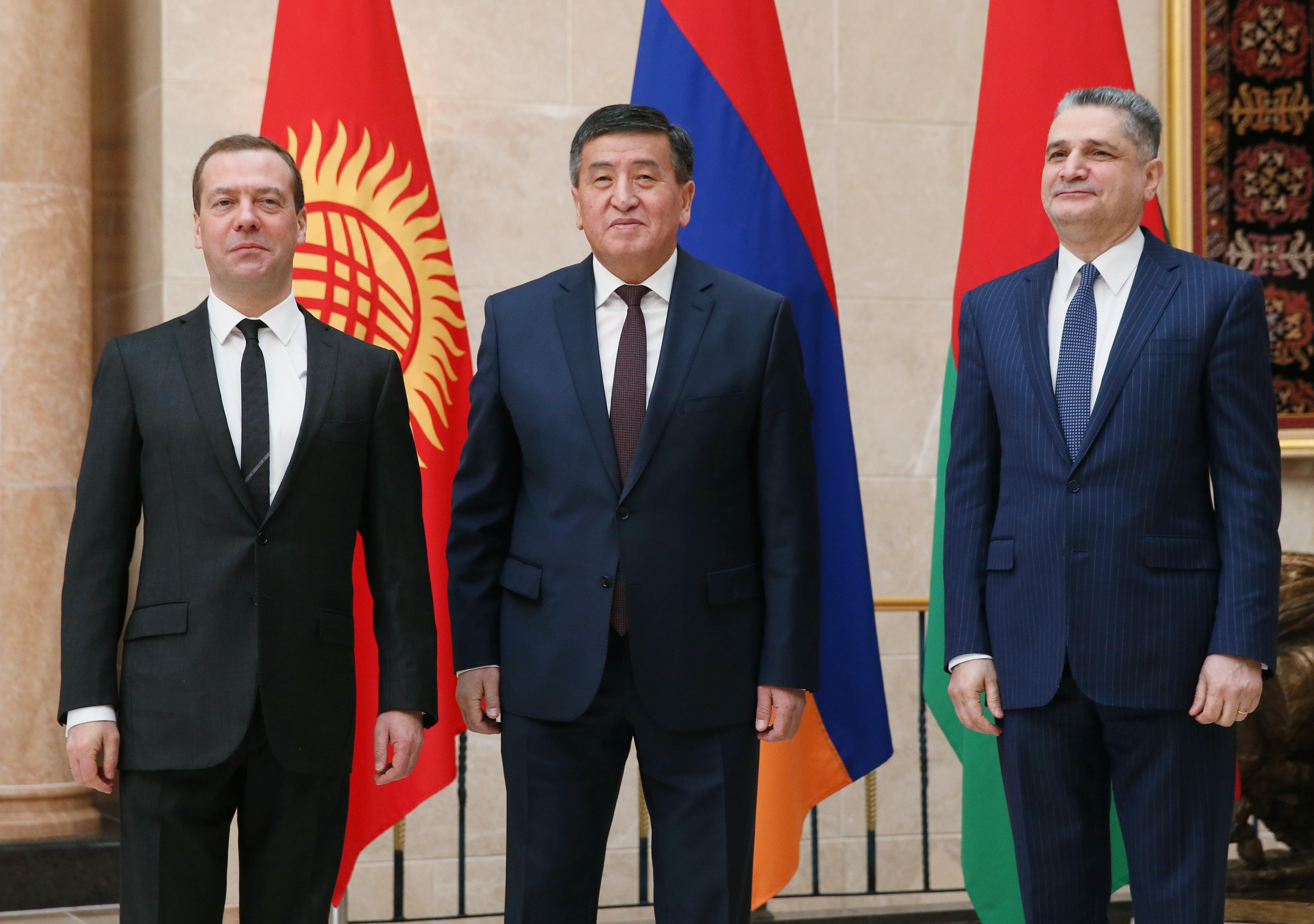
Prime Minister Jeenbekov with Dmitry Medvedev, and Tigran Sargsyan at the Eurasian Intergovernmental Council summit in Bishkek, 7 March 2017.

Jeenbekov started his career at the Lenin School in the Uzgen District, where he worked as a teacher at 18 and taught Russian and literature. In 1983, he became the chief livestock specialist of the Soviet farm in the Soviet district of Osh region and continued to work in the position for five years. In November 1988, he managed to obtain a job as an instructor in the district committee of the Communist Party of Kyrgyzstan in the Soviet district of the Osh region. After a few years, he became the director of the party committee.

After entering politics in 1993, Jeenbekov was elected chairman of the Kashka-Zhol collective farm in Kara-Kulja District. He became a Deputy of the Assembly of People's Representatives in 1995. In 2007, he became the Minister of Agriculture, Water Resources and the Processing Industry. In 2010, he served as the governor of the Osh region, and in 2015, he was appointed director of the State Personnel Service. In March 2016, he was appointed first deputy head of the Presidential Administration, before his appointment as Prime Minister of Kyrgyzstan.

== 2017 Kyrgyz presidential election ==
Jeenbekov resigned from the post of prime minister on 21 August 2017, after being named as an official candidate in the 2017 presidential election. He stated that he "[wanted] to be in an equal position with other presidential candidates."

The election was held on 15 October 2017. Kyrgyzstan's central election commission reported a total of almost 1.7 million votes cast, of which Jeenbekov won 54.74 percent. Jeenbekov's election marks the first democratic transfer of power in a Kyrgyz election in which Azay Guliyev confirmed the election to be one of the few peaceful elections in Kyrgyzstan's history.

== Presidency (2017–2020) ==
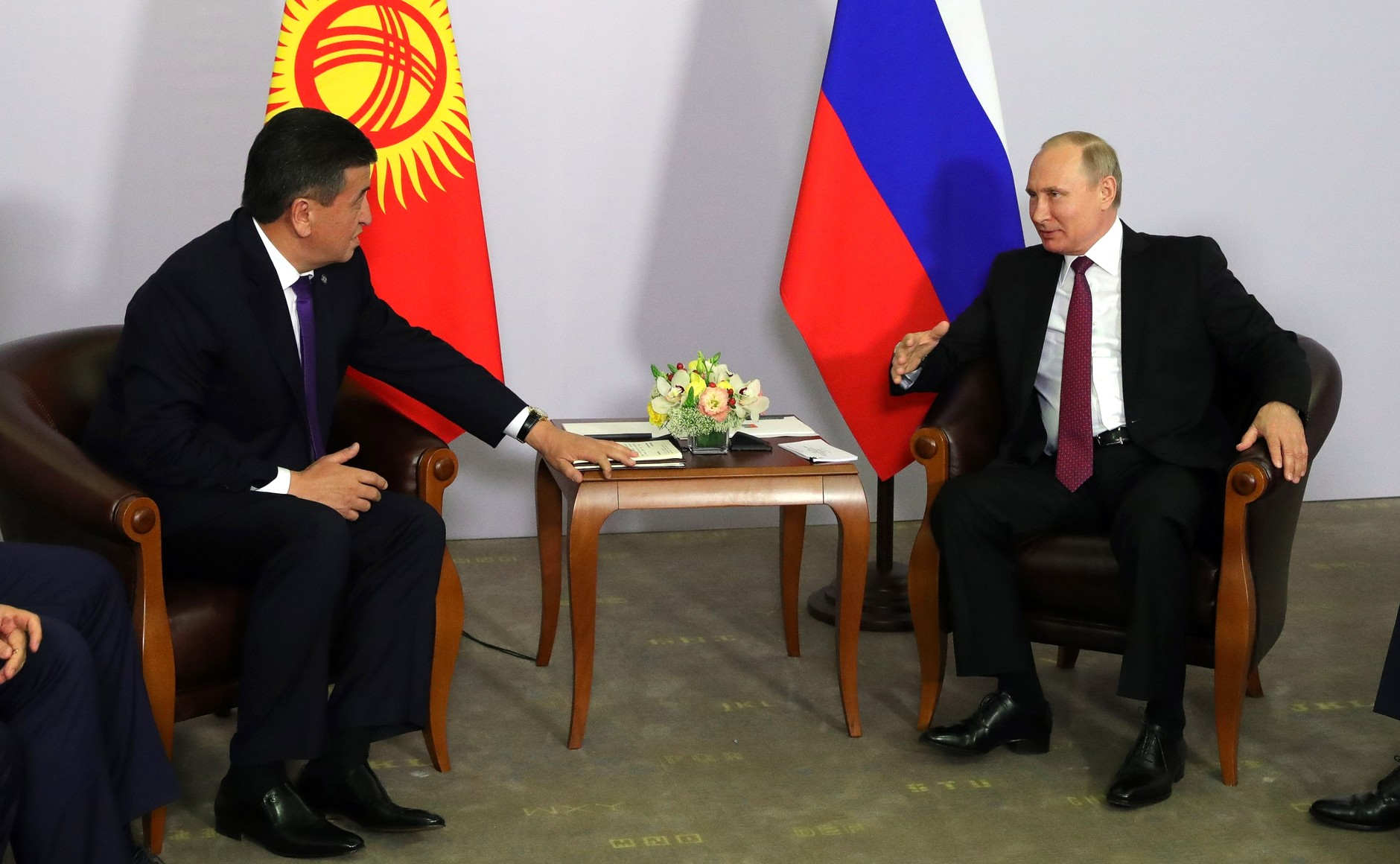
Jeenbekov with Russian president Vladimir Putin during a meeting in Sochi, Russia, on 14 May 2018

Jeenbekov was inaugurated as president on 24 November 2017 in a ceremony that took place in the Enesay reception house of the Ala Archa State Residence. His first presidential decree in office was made to confer the title of Hero of the Kyrgyz Republic to former president Atambayev. Just days into his presidency, Jeenbekov changed the time of his departure to the White House to early in the morning to avoid Bishkek traffic, a move which was praised by many Bishkek residents. He conducted his first foreign visit after assuming the presidency was to Russia where he met with Vladimir Putin. Early into his presidency, he has been accused of undermining the country's democracy by sandressing opposition politicians lists. On 19 April 2018, Jeenbekov fired his Prime Minister Sapar Isakov and the government following a vote of no confidence from Kyrgyzstan's parliament.

In an address to journalists in May 2018, Jeenbekov promised to fight against tribalism being imposed on the country saying that "We will take measures against those, who impose a "north-south" issue in the society."

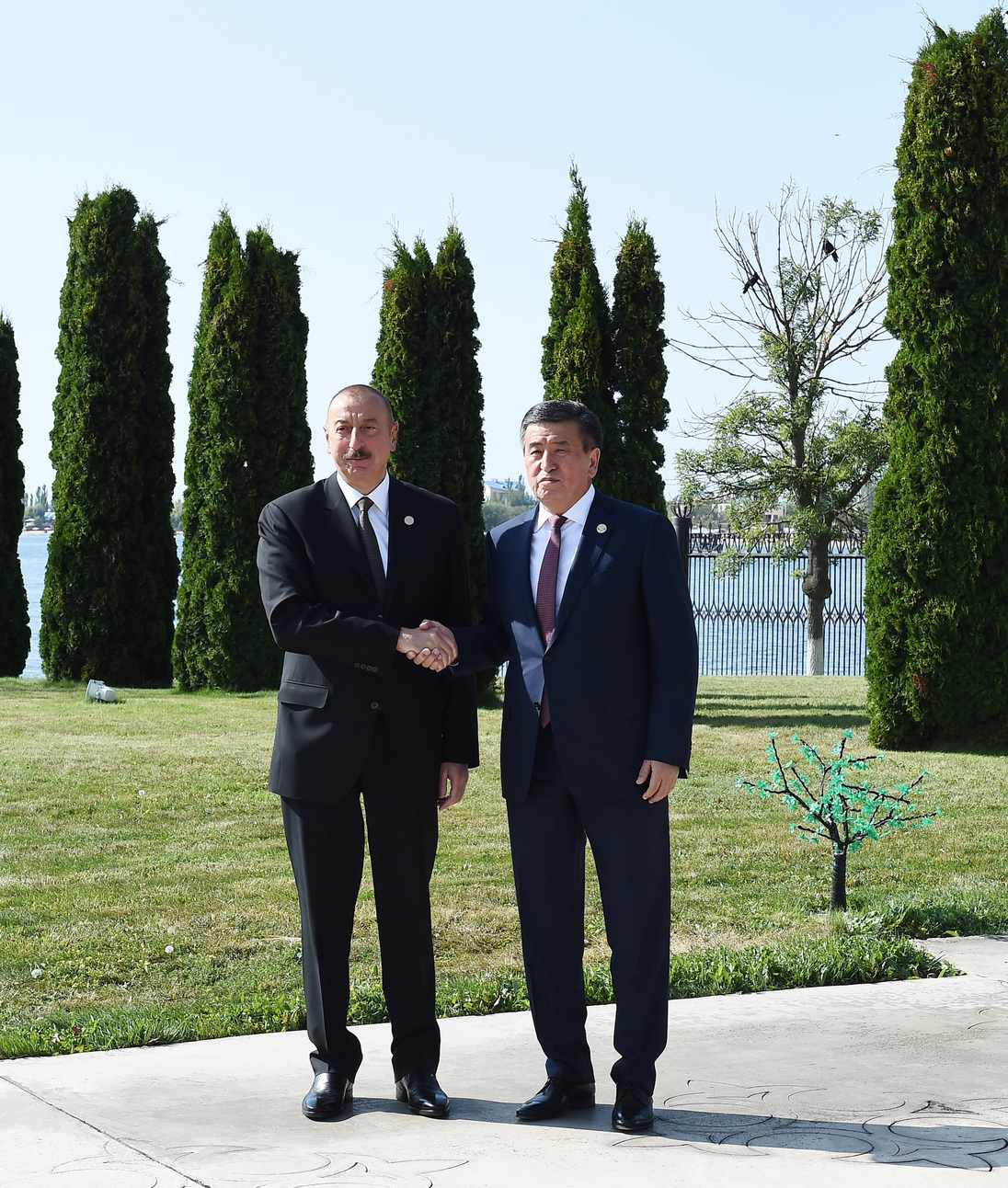
Jeenbekov with President of Azerbaijan Ilham Aliyev during the 6th summit of Cooperation Council of Turkic Speaking States in Cholpon-Ata, Kyrgyzstan in September 2018

Jeenbekov opened the Central Mosque of Imam Sarakhsi, which is the largest mosque in Central Asia, with his Turkish counterpart Recep Tayyip Erdoğan during his visit to Bishkek in early September 2018. During his visit, Erdoğan pressured Jeenbekov to take the appropriate measures to deal with Turkish Islamist leader Fethullah Gülen.

Jeenbekov opened the 2018 World Nomad Games in Cholpon-Ata on 3 September 2018, marking the first major international event that Jeenbekov has hosted in Kyrgyzstan. Receiving Hungarian prime minister Viktor Orbán at the Cholpon-Ata State Residence the next day, Jeenbekov thanked the prime minister for becoming the first Hungarian leader to visit the country since its independence. In April 2019, Jeenbekov received Valentina Shevchenko (a professional Kyrgyz–Peruvian mixed martial artist fighter) during her tour of her native Kyrgyzstan, her first visit in seven years. Jeenbekov praised Shevchenko's role in her profession, even going as far as to say that she "defended the honour of our Kyrgyzstan". On 4 May he ordered that all mining of uranium in the country will be banned.

=== Foreign policy ===
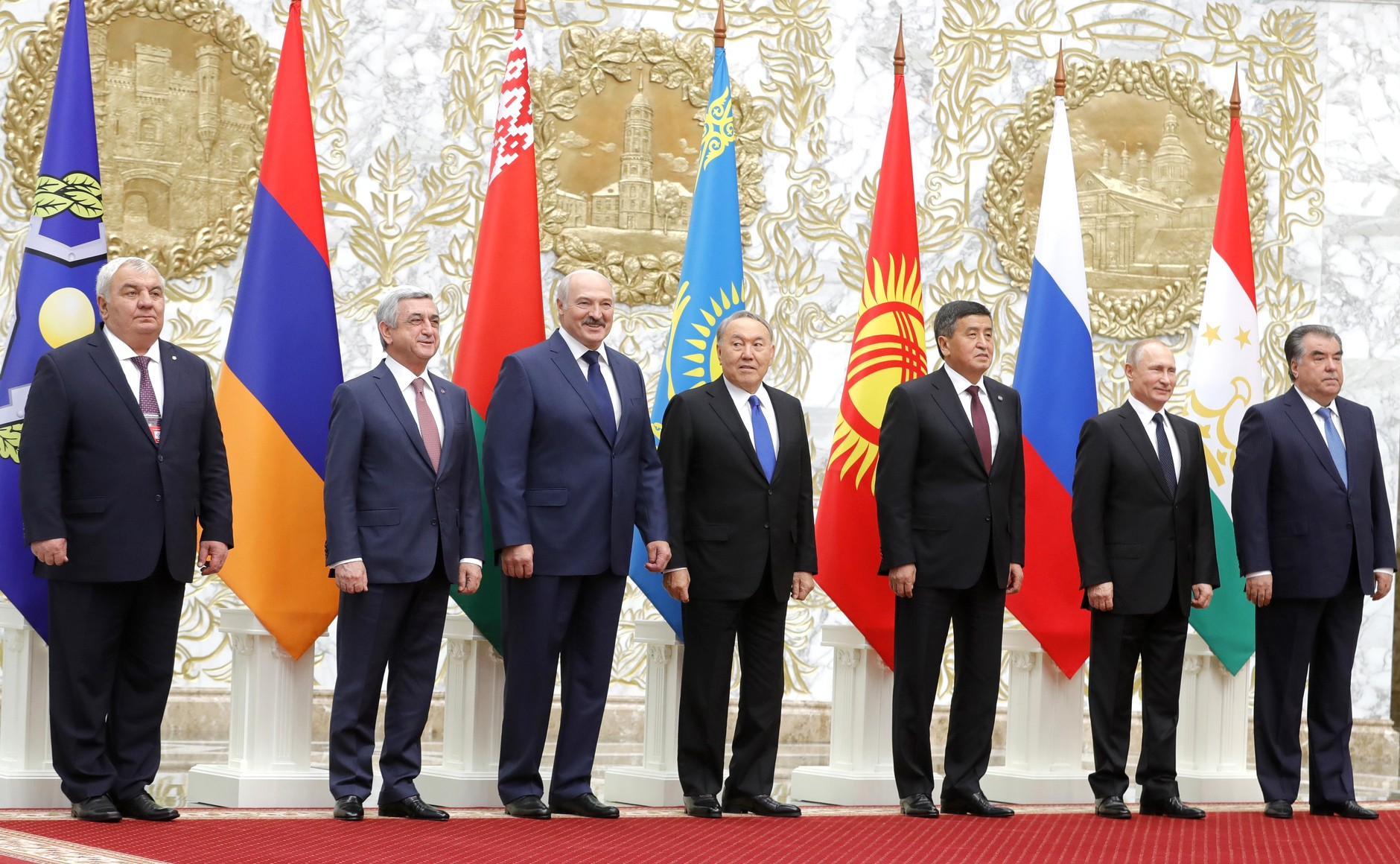
Jeenbekov with other CSTO leaders at the CSTO summit in Minsk, November 2017.

Jeenbekov's foreign policy has been described as much more balanced than his predecessors. In his inaugural remarks, he vowed to make the Kremlin the country's "main strategic partner" as well as signaled that he will seek more collaborative bilateral ties with China and the European Union. He is noted for repairing relations with neighboring Kazakhstan and Uzbekistan, following an improvement in ties under Uzbek President Shavkat Mirziyoyev, who took power the year before Jeenbekov, and a diplomatic crisis after Jeenbekov's predecessor, Almazbek Atambayev accused Kazakhstan of election interference and called the Kazakh government under President Nursultan Nazarbayev a "dictatorship". All of this is reflected in the international working and state visits which he makes often, with Jeenbekov visiting Russia and Kazakhstan the most since 28 November 2017.

In an address to the Parliament of Kyrgyzstan in late June 2018, he outlined and made clear that his country will pursue and develop multilateral relations with Turkey, Japan, South Korea, the United States, and the Arab world by the end of his term in 2023. In his first year in office, President Jeenbekov participated in 30 international meetings, where 77 bilateral agreements and 414 multilateral documents were signed. Also during his first year, Kyrgyzstan established diplomatic relations with four foreign countries.

In March 2019, Jeenbekov made his remarks during a meeting with the heads of diplomatic missions of Kyrgyzstan that his country had plans to step up work on development of bilateral co-operation with the United States and United Kingdom. The draft of a new co-operation agreement with the United States is currently being reconciled.

During Vladimir Putin's state visit to Bishkek in March 2019, he ordered that a new marble pavilion be created outside the Ala Archa State Residence to provide a sound place for the National Guard to render honors. Since then, he has received Xi Jinping, Khaltmaagiin Battulga, Narendra Modi at the new area. Jeenbekov attended the latter's second swearing-in ceremony in late May in his first visit to the Indian sub-continent.

==== State visits hosted by Jeenbekov ====
Date	Country	Visitor	Notes
1 September 2018	Turkey	President Recep Tayyip Erdoğan	
5 September 2018	Hungary	Prime Minister Viktor Orbán	
28 March 2019	Russia	President Vladimir Putin	
12 June 2019	Mongolia	President Khaltmaagiin Battulga	
13 June 2019	China	President Xi Jinping	
14 June 2019	India	Prime Minister Narendra Modi	
27–28 November 2019	Kazakhstan	President Kassym-Jomart Tokayev	

== Establishment of a family-clan regime ==
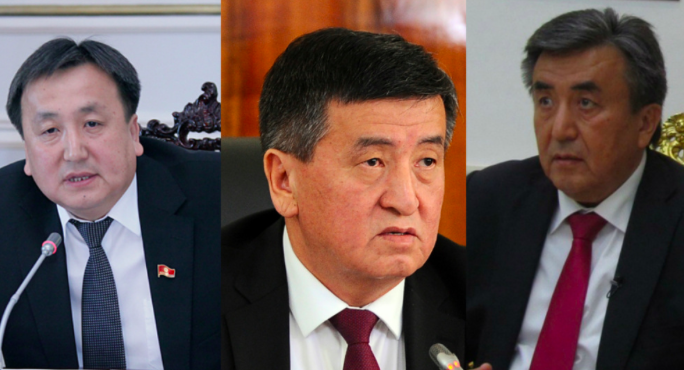
The Jeenbekov brothers - Asylbek and Zhusupzhan - widely influenced the political vertical of power in Kyrgyzstan, causing accusations of family-clan dictatorship

Jeenbekov's rule was associated with the strengthening of family-clan ties at the highest echelons of power. It was increasingly said that key positions in the state were occupied by people close to the president by blood or regional affiliation. The president's brother, parliament deputy Asylbek Jeenbekov, was openly called the president's right hand and the "shadow cardinal."

Jeenbekov's son-in-law became the head of the foreign policy department of the president's office, his nephew Nooruz headed the "Gazprom Kyrgyzstan" branches, another brother, Jusup Jeenbekov, headed the embassy in Ukraine, and another nephew Teniz became the head of the "Ayyl Bank" branches. Many saw this as a departure from the democratic ideals and principles that Kyrgyzstan tried to uphold since its inception. Such a strengthening of the family-clan regime undermined the trust of the people in the government and became the main reason for its overthrow.

As it turned out later, cases with a politically motivated bias were personally handled by the president's nephew Rustambek Borombaev in Attorney general's office, and his relatives also entered the leadership circles of the corrupt South-West customs of Kyrgyzstan.

== Сorruption during coronavirus pandemic ==
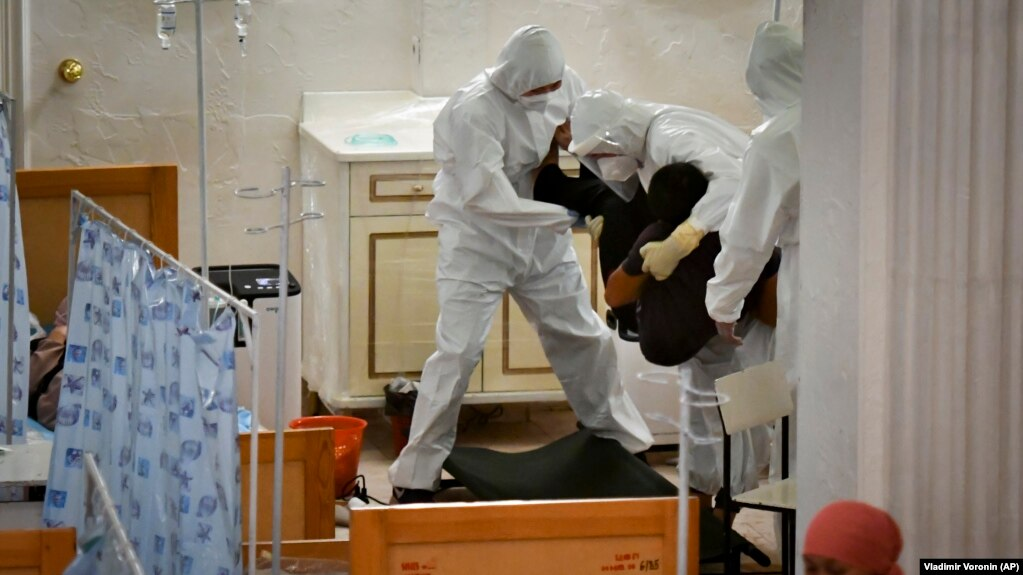
The pandemic hit Kyrgyzstan especially hard, leading to many deaths.

In July, Kyrgyzstan topped the global statistics for mortality per capita on specific days at least 6 times. The official number of deaths during the pandemic period was 1,390; however, experts claimed that the death toll was many times higher, with excess mortality being 6,390 people. In total, international financial institutions provided the country with grants amounting to $165.8 million and loans totaling $461.5 million.

The public and the media accused the country's authorities of excessive mortality from the coronavirus pandemic, particularly pointing out corrupt schemes involving people connected to the president's brother, Asylbek Jeenbekov. The amount of funds used in state procurement sometimes exceeded the market value of goods by ten times. The company "Farwater" won a bid for the supply of PPE suits for 6,000 soms, even though volunteers purchased them at prices ranging from 240 to 360 soms. In another lot won by "Farwater", respiratory masks were procured at 400 soms, although similar masks in Bishkek can be found ranging from 30 to 150 soms. Meanwhile, single-use three-layer masks from the "Farwater" tender were bought for 25 soms, even though you can find such masks for as low as 10 soms. The company was linked to the "Birimdik" party, affiliated with Asylbek Jeenbekov. According to the Ministry of Justice registry information, the founder and director of the company is Sadykova Indira Tofikovna. The name of "Farwater's" director is also listed among the founders of the president's brother Asylbek Jeenbekov's party "Birimdik".

Additionally, conclusions drawn by an interdepartmental commission later revealed that a third treatment protocol prepared by mid-May 2020 was intentionally withheld. The purpose was for several pharmaceutical companies, directly linked to high-ranking officials, to get rid of purchased drugs that turned out to be ineffective. Corruption during the pandemic became one of the reasons for the downfall of Sooronbay Jeenbekov's authority.

In June 2020, Jeenbekov went into quarantine after returning from a cut-short visit to Moscow after two of his staffers tested positive for COVID-19 during the pandemic in Kyrgyzstan. He was due to attend the 2020 Moscow Victory Day Parade. He declared 30 July as a Day of National Mourning. That day, he took part in an Islamic religious ceremony to honour those who lost their lives from the pandemic, saying "Let the souls of our deceased compatriots rest in peace, may their souls be in heaven".

=== Relationship with Atambayev ===
Since Jeenbekov took power in November 2017, he has had what can only be described as a contentious relationship with his predecessor and former ally, Almazbek Atambayev. In the early months of his presidency, he used his position to praise Atambayev's work, even going as far giving him the title of "Hero of the Kyrgyz Republic", which is the highest honor that can be bestowed upon a citizen of Kyrgyzstan. Atambayev strongly backed Jeenbekov during the 2017 election against his opponent Ömürbek Babanov, even referring to himself as an "older brother" to Jeenbekov.

Since Atambayev left office on 24 November 2017 and handed the presidency to his successor Sooronbay Jeenbekov, he has served as head of the SDPK. In his post presidency he got back to the political arena, most notably by criticizing his own successor. This criticism, which began in the spring of 2018, has mostly revolved around Jeenbekov's establishment of family clan regime.

By that time, the media began to dazzle with headlines about the family-clan regime of Jeenbekov and dozens of his relatives in the highest state apparatus, embassies and parliament. On 17 March, Atambayev expressed regret by saying: "I apologize to everyone for bringing this person to power".

As Jeenbekov continued serving as president, a rift grew between the two as Atambayev later became more involved in politics in the 6 months post his presidency, eventually rising to the Chairmanship of the Social Democratic Party of Kyrgyzstan, of which Jeenbekov was a member of. In Atambayev's remarks following his assumption to the post, he criticized Jeenbekov for his handling of the Bishkek power plant failure earlier that, as well as rebuked him for not taking steps to force his brother - Asylbek Jeenbekov - to resign from parliament.

In early April 2018, Jeenbekov dismissed two high-ranking officials in the State Committee for National Security (GKNB) who are considered to be close to Atambayev. The move was seen as an apparent jab at Atambayev and his former government. In an interview on his 60th birthday later in the year, Jeenbekov accused Atambayev of indirectly and directly trying to influence him and his presidency, saying the following to the 24 Kyrgyzstan news agency:

His attempts to turn me into a puppet leader through some third individuals, to direct my actions – discredit him as a person, as an ex-president, as a fellow party member and associate.

He later denied that he was fighting with Atambayev, saying at a press conference in December 2018 that his major goal was to do "nothing but to work day and night" while saying that he does "not consider anyone a rival". Due to the failed attempt by SOBR Units to arrest Atambayev at his residence in Koy-Tash on 7 August, which resulted in the death of one soldier, Jeenbekov came back from his vacation and called a meeting of the Security Council, in which Jeenbekov accused Atambayev of "rudely violating the constitution".

The relationship between the two and their supporters eventually became so strained that the SDPK suffered splits in 2019, and the majority of each faction formed their own parties to run in the October 2020 Kyrgyz parliamentary election where the SDPK did not field any candidate.

=== 2020 protests and resignation ===
Following the October 2020 parliamentary election, protests broke out throughout the country, with many demanding his resignation. Earlier that August, he indicated that the elections could not be postponed in spite of the coronavirus pandemic. During the elections, several parties close to Jeenbekov were accused of buying votes. Out of the parties that made it into parliament, only the United Kyrgyzstan party opposed Jeenbeko. On early Tuesday morning of 6 October, protesters claimed control over Ala-Too Square in central Bishkek and also managed to seize the White House and Supreme Council buildings, entering the President's offices and destroying portraits of Jeenbekov. On 6 October, following the protests, the Central Election Commission annulled the results of the parliamentary elections. Jeenbekov claimed that he faced a coup d'état, and then he told the BBC that he was "ready to give the responsibility to strong leaders". On 8 October, it was announced that his whereabouts were unknown, with the Interior Ministry saying that it is not engaged in searching for him. Meanwhile, opposition parliamentarians launched impeachment procedures against him that day.

In an address published on the presidential website on 8 October, Jeenbekov declared: "After legitimate executive authorities have been approved and we are back on the path of lawfulness, I am ready to leave the post of President of the Kyrgyz Republic". Later that day however, despite all indications of the opposite, Jeenbekov declared a state of emergency in Bishkek and ordered the deployment of the Kyrgyz Army to the streets. He charged General Taalaibek Omuraliev as Chief of the General Staff to lead the response, replacing General Rayimberdi Duishenbiev. He also sacked Omurbek Suvanaliyev, who served as the national security chief.

Jeenbekov resigned on 15 October 2020. He stated as his official reason staying not being "worth the integrity of our country and agreement in society". He also called "on Japarov and the other politicians to withdraw their supporters out of the capital of the nation and to return the people of Bishkek to peaceful lives".

== Post-presidency ==
The day after his resignation, Japarov signed an order that provided Jeenbekov with the status of ex-president, which carries the privileges of access to a lifetime of personal security, the right to reside in the main government residence, a service car, and free medical service. His next major appearance was alongside the Kyrgyz leadership at Ata-Beyit during a ceremony on the Days of History and Commemoration of Ancestors. Jeenbekov took part in Japarov's inauguration on 28 January. A week later, Jeenbekov left the country for Saudi Arabia, with many speculating that he may be going into self-exile. According to Jeenbekov, his trip was a pilgrimage that came at the invitation of the King Salman of Saudi Arabia.

== Personal life ==
His wife, Aigul Jeenbekova (née Tokoeva), has been married to Jeenbekov since 1988. Together, they have two children, with their eldest daughter, Baktygul, being married and a graduate from the Kyrgyz-Russian Slavic University. Their younger child is a son named Iman. Jeenbekov's younger brother, Asylbek Jeenbekov, is also a politician, while his other brother, Zhusupbek Sharipov, is a former governor from Jalal-Abad and the former ambassador of Kyrgyzstan to Ukraine. Another brother of his, Kantoro Toktomamatov (born in 1947), who formerly served as rector of the University of Economy and Enterprise, died in April 2017. Aside from his native Kyrgyz, Jeenbekov is also fluent in Russian.

== Awards ==
- Order of Manas (2015)
- Medal of Dank (2011)
- Honored Worker of Agriculture
- Order of Nazarbayev (2019)

== Notes ==
Political offices
Preceded by Temir Sariyev	Prime Minister of Kyrgyzstan; 2016–2017	Succeeded by Muhammetkaliy Abulgaziyev; Acting
Preceded by Almazbek Atambayev	President of Kyrgyzstan; 2017–2020	Succeeded by Sadyr Japarov; Acting
