= Biy-Myrza =

Biy-Myrza Бий-Мырза
- Location within Kyrgyzstan
- Coordinates: 40°37′55″N 73°34′29″E
- Country: Kyrgyzstan
- Region: Osh Region
- District: Kara-Kulja District
- Elevation: 1,365 m (4,478 ft)

Population (2021)
  - Total: 4,003
- Time zone: UTC+6

Biy-Myrza (Kyrgyz: Бий-Мырза, romanized: Biy-Myrza; formerly Telman) is a village in Kara-Kulja District of Osh Region of Kyrgyzstan. Its population was 4,003 in 2021.

The village is the birthplace of the 5th president Sooronbay Jeenbekov and his brother ex-chairman Asylbek Jêênbekov.
