= Zhusupbek Sharipov =

Kyrgyzstani politician

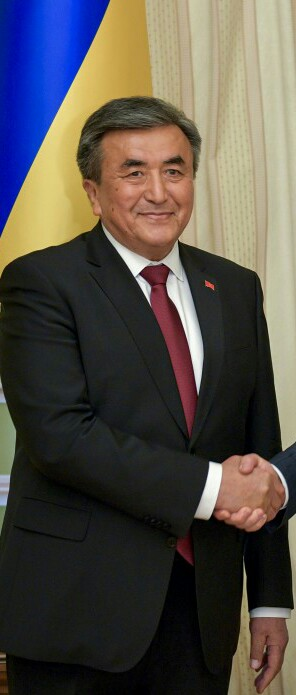
Sharipov in Kyiv.

Zhusupbek Sharipovich Sharipov (Kyrgyz: Жусупбек Шарипович (Шарип уулу) Шарипов, Zhusupbek Şaripoviç (Şarip uulu) Şaripov) (born 27 April 1955 in Kara-Kulja District, Osh Region, Kyrgyz SSR, Soviet Union) is a Kyrgyzstani politician.

Sharipov served as the Kyrgyz Ambassador to Ukraine from July 2018 to 2022. He has been in diplomatic service of the Ministry of Foreign Affairs since the mid-2000s. Prior to serving in Kyiv, he took up diplomatic posts in Kuwait, Morocco, Jordan, and Bahrain as ambassador. Before the Tulip Revolution occurred in the country, Sharipov also served as the governor of the Jalal-Abad Region in the eastern part of the country.

Apart from his native Kyrgyz language, he is fluent in and commonly speaks Russian, Ukrainian and Uzbek.

Sharipov is the older brother of the former President of Kyrgyzstan, Sooronbay Jeenbekov. His other brother Asylbek is a member of the Supreme Council.
