= Birimdik =

Unity Биримдик
- Leader: Vacant
- Founder: Ainuru Altybaeva
- Founded: 19 August 2005 (as the "Birimdik" Democratic Party) 10 September 2019 (re-founded)
- Registered: 8 May 2013 (current name) 13 September 2019 (re-registered)
- Preceded by: Pro-Jeenbekov faction of SDPK (2019)
- Headquarters: Bishkek
- Membership (2020): 6,000
- Ideology: Social democracy Democratic socialism Pragmatic Eurasianism; Russophilia
- Political position: Centre-left
- Supreme Council: 0 / 90

Flag used in the old logo

Website
- birimdik.org

Birimdik (/ˌbɪrɪmˈdɪk/ BIRR-im-DIK; Kyrgyz: Биримдик [ˌpɪɾɪmˈtɪ́k]; lit. 'Unity'), officially the Party of Democratic Socialism–Eurasian Choice "Birimdik", (Note: Kyrgyz: «Биримдик» демократиялык социализм – евразиялык тандоо партиясы, «Birimdik» demokratialyk socializm – ievrazialyk tandoo partiasy; Russian: Партия демократического социализма – евразийский выбор «Биримдик», romanized: Pártiya demokratichéskogo socialízma – yevrazíyskiy výbor «Birimdík») is a pro-Jeenbekov political party in Kyrgyzstan, founded in 2005 as the Birimdik Democratic Party (Kyrgyz: «Биримдик» демократиялык партиясы; Russian: Демократическая партия «Биримдик»). On 8 May 2013, it was registered with the current name. The party includes many former officials and deputies.

The political ideology of the party is Eurasianism, socialism, democracy and parliamentarism.

As of 2019, despite labeling itself as a democratic socialist party, Unity is in effect a successor to the SDPK, a centre-left social-democratic party with some centrist tendencies.

The party has territorial subdivisions in all regions of Kyrgyzstan, there are governing bodies of the party, such as: the political council, the executive committee and the audit commission.

== History ==
Old logo, based on the flag of the Kyrgyz SSR and the logo of United Russia

The party was founded on 19 August 2005, and received its current name on May 8, 2013. In 2019, the party was renewed and the leader changed, Marat Amankulov became the new head, re-registration took place on 13 September 2019.

=== 2020 Parliamentary elections ===
Closer to the parliamentary elections of 2020, its leaders began to leave the old party of power in Kyrgyzstan – SDPK and move into the ranks of Birimdik.

Kyrgyz political scientists gave the greatest chances to get into parliament specifically to Birimdik, as well as to the Mekenim Kyrgyzstan, Kyrgyzstan, Bir Bol, Ata-Meken and others. The brother of the President of Kyrgyzstan Sooronbay Jeenbekov, Asylbek Jêênbekov, was nominated from the party to parliament.

In early September, a video was published in which the candidate from Birimdik promises voters half a million soms and asks for 300 votes.

According to a sociological survey by the "Common Cause" Foundation, the party took second place in the country in terms of rating with a score of 2% of the vote. Among all respondents, 58% of respondents found it difficult to answer, 14% were going to vote against all.

The party entered the top six parties with the highest election costs, along with the following organizations: Mekenim Kyrgyzstan, Bir Bol, Kyrgyzstan, Ata-Meken and Zamandash.

The party's list included 200 people, the first was Akylbek Zhamangulov, a deputy of Jogorku Kenesh of the VI convocation, elected from the Respublika–Ata Zhurt party, the second was Ulukbek Kochkorov, a deputy of parliament of the V convocation, and the third was a deputy of the Jogorku Kenesh of the VI convocation on the list of SDPK Torobay Zulpukarov. 70% of candidates were men (140 people) and 30% women (60 people).

According to the announced results of the parliamentary election (99% of ballots were processed), Birimdik won 24.90% of the votes, after which rallies of supporters of parties that did not enter the country's parliament began in the country. A party spokesman said that Birimdik is ready to take part in the repeat parliamentary elections.

According to the "Common Cause" Foundation, 75 cases of bribery of voters by the Birimdik party were recorded.

=== Aftermath ===
On October 6, in the city of Osh, a rally of party supporters was held, the participants of which were against the overthrow of Sooronbay Jeenbekov.

In December 2020, the leader of the party Marat Amankulov left the Birimdik.

The party did not participate in the 2021 parliamentary election. Former members of the party joined other parties to run in the election.

== Election results ==
=== Jogorku Kenesh ===
Election	Leader	Votes	%	Seats	+/–	Government
2020	Marat Amankulov	487,685	24.90 (#1)	46 / 120		Elections annulled
2021	Did not participate					

== Notable members ==
- Marat Amankulov (party leader 2019–2020)
- Asylbek Jeenbekov (brother of President Sooronbay Jeenbekov)
- Ulukbek Kochkorov, Minister of Labour
- Aliza Soltonbekova, Deputy Minister of Labour
- Aida Kasymalieva, former Radio Free Europe/Radio Liberty journalist and deputy speaker of the Supreme Council since December 2018
