= Rayimberdi Duishenbiev =

Major General Rayimberdi Duishenbiev
- Райимберди Дуйшенбиев
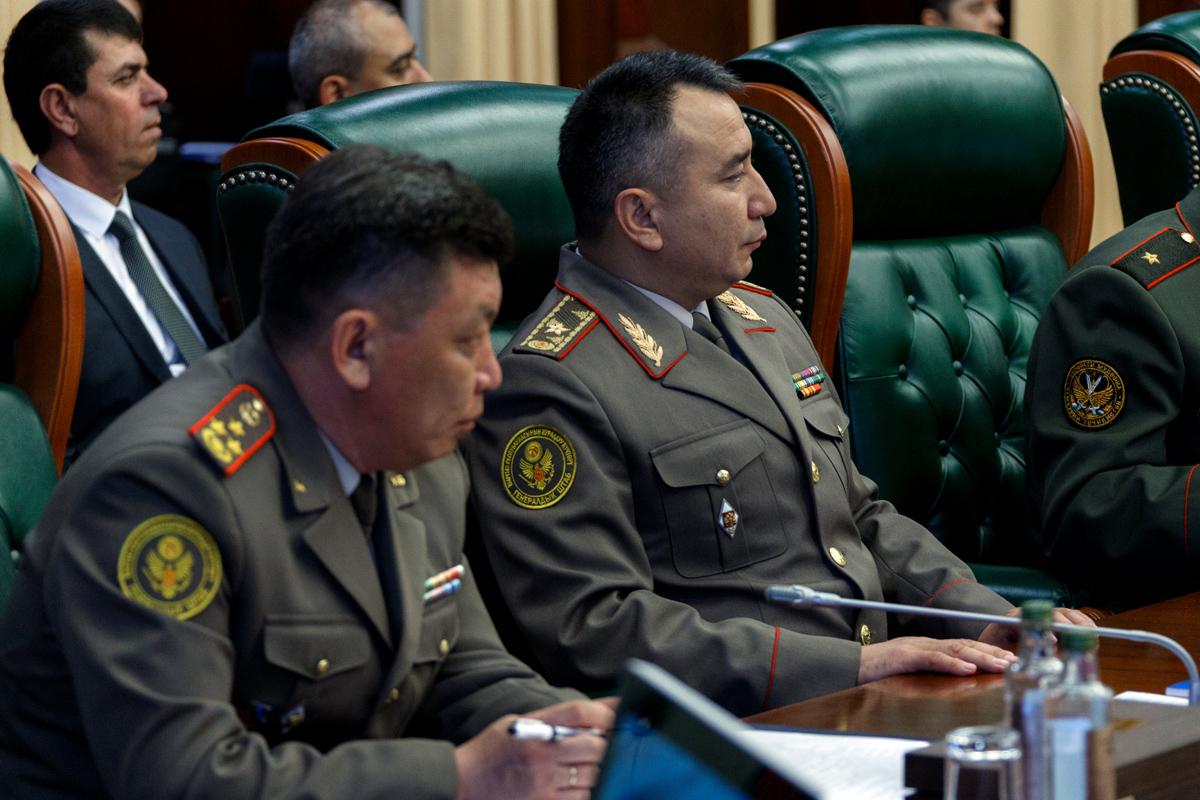
- Born: 11 December 1972 (age 53); Jalal-Abad, Kyrgyz SSR, Soviet Union
- Military career
- Allegiance: Kyrgyzstan
- Branch: Armed Forces of the Republic of Kyrgyzstan
- Rank: Major General
- Commands: Chief of the General Staff of the Armed Forces of the Kyrgyz Republic

Rayimberdi Seydakmatovich Duishenbiev (Kyrgyz: Райимберди Сейдакматович (Сейдакмат уулу) Дуйшенбиев, Rayimberdi Seydakmatovich (Seydakmat uulu) Duyshenbiyev) is a Kyrgyzstani General who served as the Chief of the General Staff of the Armed Forces of the Kyrgyz Republic from 11 May 2016 to 9 October 2020. He is also the former commander of the Kyrgyzstan Frontier Force.

== Career ==
In the early 1990s, he studied at the Academy of the Border Service of the National Security Committee and graduated from the Moscow Border Institute of the FSB of the Russian Federation in 2007. In August 2011, he was appointed deputy Chairman of the State Border Guard Service. Beginning in November 2013 and all the way until February 2014, he served as the acting Chairman of the State Border Service. On 22 February 2014, he was officially appointed the chairman of the State Border Service. On 11 May 2016, by the decree of President Almazbek Atambayev, he was appointed Chief of the General Staff of the Armed Forces. In November 2018, Duishenbiev was the center of controversy when a scandal involving his younger brother, who is also a soldier, emerged sparking accusations of special treatment due to his brother's status.

In October 2020, he was dismissed as Chief of the General Staff by President Sooronbay Jeenbekov due to his response to the 2020 Kyrgyzstan protests. He was replaced by a predecessor of his, General Taalaibek Omuraliev.
