= Second oath of office ceremony of Narendra Modi =

2019 oath of office ceremony of the Prime Minister of India

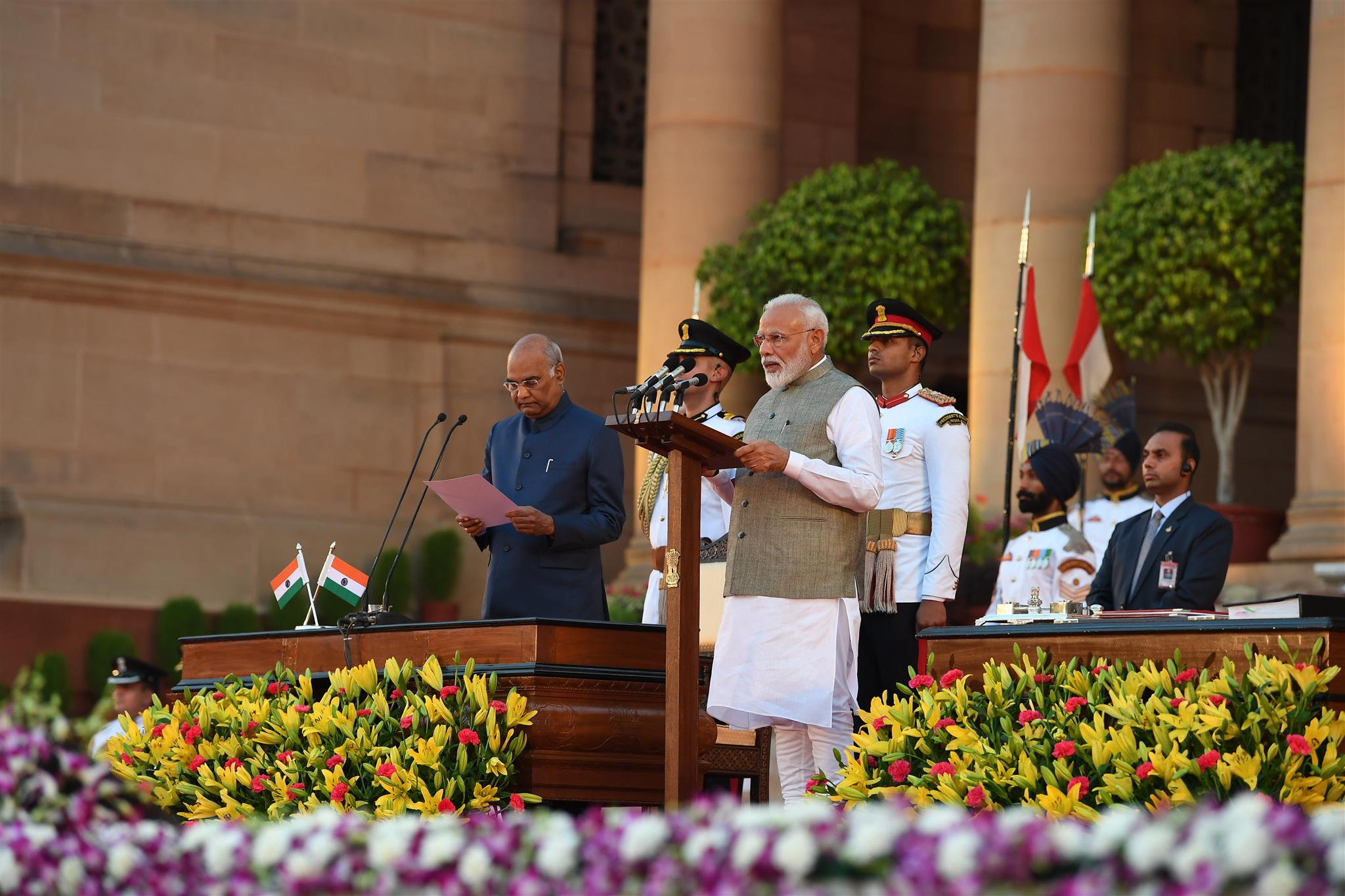
- Narendra Modi takes the oath of office as the Prime Minister of India, with President Ram Nath Kovind administering the oath.
- Date: May 30, 2019; 7 years ago
- Location: Rashtrapati Bhavan, New Delhi, India 28.6143°N 77.199°E
- Participants: Prime Minister of India, Narendra Modi; Second Modi ministry Assuming office President of India, Ram Nath Kovind Administering oath

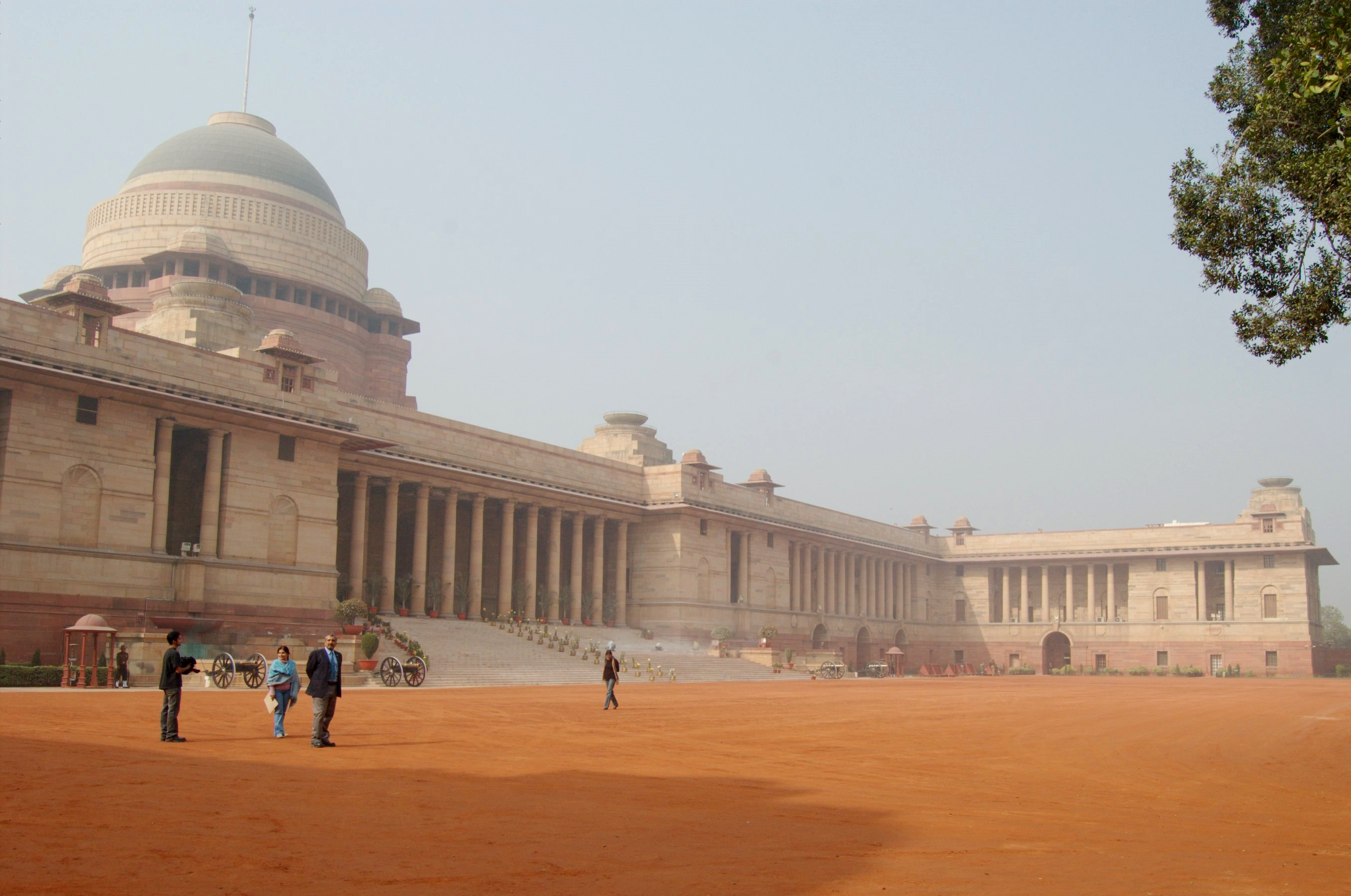
Forecourt of the Rashtrapati Bhavan, the venue of the ceremony

Oath of office

I, (name), do swear in the name of God (or, solemnly affirm) that I will bear true faith and allegiance to the Constitution of India as by law established, that I will uphold the sovereignty and integrity of India, that I will faithfully and conscientiously discharge my duties as a Prime Minister for the Union and that I will do right to all manner of people in accordance with the Constitution and the law, without fear or favour, afection or ill-will.

— Constitution of India, Third Schedule, Part I
Oath of secrecy

I, (name), do swear in the name of God (or, solemnly affirm) that I will not directly or indirectly communicate or reveal to any person or persons any matter which shall be brought under my consideration, or shall become known to me as a Prime Minister for the Union, except as may be required for the due discharge of my duties as Prime Minister.

— Constitution of India, Third Schedule, Part II

Narendra Modi, parliamentary leader of the Bharatiya Janata Party, started his tenure after his oath of office as the 16th Prime Minister of India on 30 May 2019. Several other ministers were also sworn in along with Modi. The ceremony was noted by media for being the first ever oath of office of an Indian Prime Minister to have been attended by the heads of all BIMSTEC countries.

== Background ==
After the declaration of election results in May 2019, Modi met the President of India Ram Nath Kovind in May where Kovind invited Modi to form the next government. The BJP had won 303 seats and their alliance National Democratic Alliance won a total of 353 seats in the 543-seat Lok Sabha, the strongest mandate since the 1984 elections where Indian National Congress had won. The BJP then announced that Modi would be sworn in on 30 May 2019 at 7 p.m. For the first time in India, a non-Congress government was re-elected.

== Invitees ==
Along with Mauritius and Kyrgyzstan, all the countries in BIMSTEC were invited distinct from invitation to SAARC countries in first ceremony. Over 8,000 Indian and international guests including various politicians, diplomats, government officials, constitutional authorities and heads of the states were invited.

BIMSTEC on world map

=== International dignitaries ===
Eight foreign leaders attended Prime Minister Modi's oath of office ceremony.

- Bangladesh -Abdul Hamid, President of Bangladesh attended the ceremony on behalf of Prime Minister Sheikh Hasina and reiterated the importance of strengthening bilateral ties.
- Bhutan - Prime Minister Lotay Tshering attended the ceremony on behalf of Bhutan.
- Kyrgyzstan - President Sooronbay Jeenbekov as representative and guest from Kyrgyz Republic. The leader reiterated his invitation to Modi for SCO summit which is due to be held in Kyrgyzstan.
- Mauritius - Prime Minister Pravind Jugnauth as the guest from Mauritius.
- Myanmar - Myanmar President Win Myint attended the ceremony on behalf of state counsellor Aung San Suu Kyi who was on her visit to Europe. Raveesh Kumar, spokesperson of Indian external ministry described Myanmar as a "pillar" of India's Act East policy.
- Nepal - Prime Minister KP Sharma Oli attended ceremony. Oli conveyed invitation extended by President Bidya Devi Bhandari to Indian President Ram Nath Kovind.
- Sri Lanka - Sri Lankan President Maithripala Sirisena attended the ceremony and invited Narendra Modi to visit Sri Lanka in June. Visit is scheduled between June 7 and 9.
- Thailand - Special envoy Grisada Boonrach attended the ceremony as representative and guest from Thailand.

=== National dignitaries ===
Chief Ministers of all the Indian states were listed among invitees. However, Navin Patnaik, Chief Minister of Odisha, Bhupesh Baghel, Chief Minister of Chhattisgarh and Jagan Mohan Reddy, Chief Minister of Andhra Pradesh were unable to attend ceremony. Mamata Banerjee, Chief Minister of West Bengal rejected the invitation. Besides that, various opposition leaders including Rahul Gandhi, Sonia Gandhi and former Prime Ministers were invited. A number of Indian businessmen, sportsmen and film artists also made it into the list of guests invited.

Families of BJP workers who were left dead in violence by TMC in West Bengal were also invited to the ceremony. Many religious leaders belonging to all major religions were also invited.

== Reactions ==
Pakistan - Imran Khan, Prime Minister of Pakistan congratulated Narendra Modi just after exit polls. Pakistani Foreign Minister Shah Mehmood Qureshi and various Pakistani media outlets accused Modi of pursuing anti Pakistan policy for political gains for not inviting Pakistani head of the state to ceremony.

United Arab Emirates - The Abu Dhabi National Oil Company (ADNOC) marked the occasion by lighting up the ADNOC Headquarters in Abu Dhabi with the colors of the Indian and UAE flags and portraits of Narendra Modi and Abu Dhabi Crown Prince Mohamed bin Zayed Al Nahyan.

== See also ==
- Premiership of Narendra Modi
