= Kyrgyz Economic University =

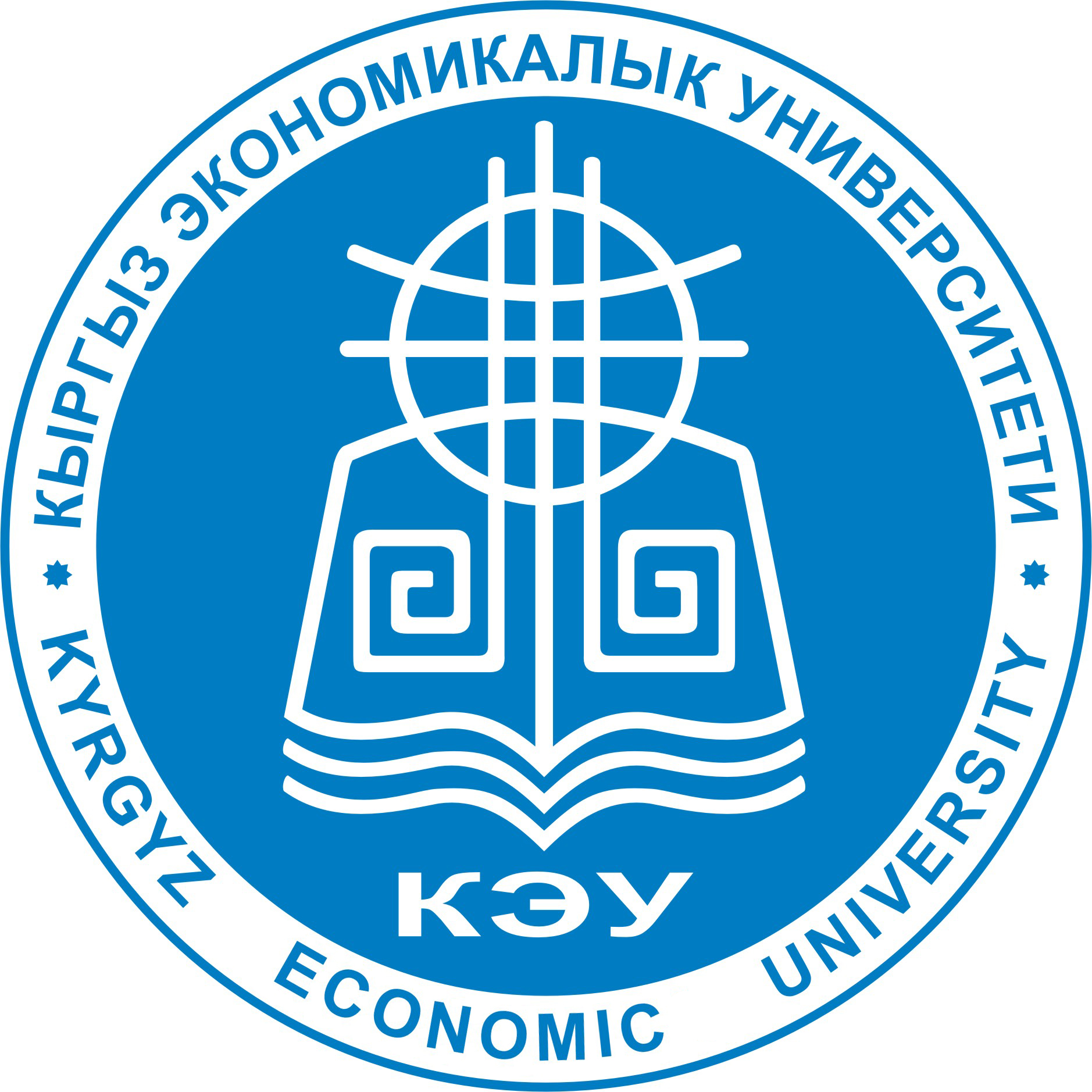
- Type: Public
- Established: 1953
- Rector: Almaz Kadyraliev
- Students: 4 000
- Location: Bishkek, Kyrgyzstan; 42.8816°N 74.5960°E
- Website: www.keu.kg

The Kyrgyz Economic University (Кыргызский экономический университет), is a Kyrgyz public university located in Bishkek. Specializing in economics and international relations, it was founded in 1953.
