= University of Economy and Enterprise =

University in Kyrgyzstan

- Kyrgyz: Экономика жана ишкердик университети
- Other names: Russian: Университет экономики и предпринимательства
- Motto: "High-quality education is a guarantee of the future!"(Kyrgyz: "Сапаттуу билим - келечекке айкын жол!")
- Established: 1993
- Location: Jalal-Abad, Kyrgyzstan; 40°56′10″N 72°58′8″E
- Website: uep.kg

Kantoro Toktomamatov University of Economy and Enterprise (Kyrgyz: Экономика жана ишкердик университети; Russian: Университет экономики и предпринимательства) is a university located in Jalal-Abad, Kyrgyzstan.

== History ==
The University of Economy and Enterprise was established in accordance with the decree of the President Askar Akayev dated April 1, 1993, "On creation of the Commercial Institute in Jalal-Abad." According to this decree the university originally was called Jalalabad Commercial Institute. The rector that was appointed was professor Kantoro Sharipovich Toktomamatov, the brother of former president Sooronbay Jeenbekov.

On 16 July 2005, it was renamed as the Academy of Economy and Enterprise. In the same year, the decision of Ministry of Education of the Kyrgyz Republic on November 4, 2005, the university was given a new status. In accordance with the new status, the institute was renamed the University of Economy and Enterprise. From the 2019 year university was renamed again and now is named International University named after K.SH.Toktomamatov.

== Academics ==
The University of Economy and Enterprise has the following faculties:

- Faculty of Economics and Administrative Sciences
  - Department of Economy
  - Department of Management
  - Department of Public Administration
  - Department of Finance and Banking
  - Department of Accounting
  - Department of Customs Affairs
  - Department of Law
- Faculty of International Kyrgyz-Turkish Institute
- Faculty of Management
  - Business Administration
  - International relations
  - Economy
  - Tourism
- Faculty of Liberal Arts
  - History
  - Turkology
