= Kyrgyz National Agrarian University =

University in Bishkek, Kyrgyzstan

Coordinates: 42.8509°N 74.6050°E

- Кыргыз улуттук агрардык университети (Kyrgyz); Кыргызский национальный аграрный университет (Russian)
- Established: 1933 (92 years ago)
- Administrative staff: 287
- Students: 7000
- Location: Bishkek, Kyrgyzstan
- Campus: Urban
- Website: www.knau.kg

Kyrgyz National Agrarian University (Kyrgyz: Кыргыз улуттук агрардык университети, Russian: Кыргызский национальный аграрный университет) is a public university in Bishkek, the capital of Kyrgyzstan. It is named after K. I. Skryabin.

KNAU was established in 1933 by then Soviet constituent Kirghiz SSR with its first admission of 53 students.

Now more than 7,000 students study at KNAU in 7 faculties and 31 specializations. The instruction is provided in Russian by 287 professors including 93 holding PhDs. As of 2022, the current rector of the university is Professor R. Z. Nurgaziev.
