= 2013 Kyrgyz protests =

2013 Kyrgyz Protests
- Date: 30 May – June 2013
- Location: Kyrgyzstan
- Caused by: Nationalization of Kumtor Gold Mine, lack of social benefits, pollution
- Methods: Demonstrations, occupations, rioting, civil disobedience

Casualties
- Death: 1
- Injuries: 50-55

The 2013 Kyrgyz protests started on May 30, 2013 when as many as 3,000 people stormed the Kumtor Gold Mine demanding it be nationalized or provide more social benefits. The mine, owned by Canada's Centerra Gold, contributes almost 12% of Kyrgyzstan's national GDP. The protests blocked a road to the mine and cut off electricity. Riot police responded when protesters tried to storm the mine's office. 50-55 people were injured in resulting clashes and 80-92 were arrested. Supporters of the protest also besieged the local governor's office in Jalal-Abad later in the evening. In response the President of Kyrgyzstan, Almazbek Atambayev, declared a state of emergency until June 10. The Prime Minister of Kyrgyzstan, Zhantoro Satybaldiyev, stated that the government would get more money from the mine, either through taxes or otherwise. Centerra Gold responded by calling the protests and occupation of the mine illegal. The road to the mine was unblocked on June 1, though the protests in Jalal-Abad continued, demanding the release of protesters from previous unrest. Protests have continued through the month of June, resulting in the death of at least one person.

Other factors that exacerbated the protests included a nitric acid spill into a nearby river in 1998, which the locals had been fighting for compensation in court.
