= Zhantoro Satybaldiyev =

Kyrgyz politician (born 1956)

- Жантөрө Сатыбалдиев
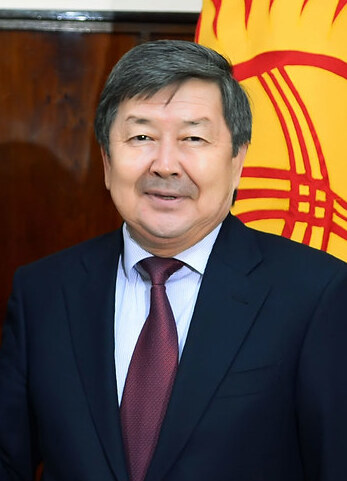
- Satybaldiyev in 2012

Chief of Staff of the President of the Kyrgyz Republic
- In office December 2011 – September 2012
- President: Almazbek Atambayev
- Preceded by: Emilbek Kaptagaev
- Succeeded by: Daniyar Narymbaev

Prime Minister of Kyrgyzstan
- In office 6 September 2012 – 25 March 2014
- President: Almazbek Atambayev
- Preceded by: Omurbek Babanov; Aaly Karashev(acting)
- Succeeded by: Djoomart Otorbaev

Personal details
- Born: 6 January 1956 (age 70) Osh, Kyrgyz Soviet Socialist Republic, Soviet Union
- Party: Independent
- Other political affiliations: Social Democratic Party of Kyrgyzstan
- Education: Frunze Polytechnic Institute

Zhantoro Zholdoshevich Satybaldiyev (Kyrgyz: Жантөрө Жолдошевич (Жолдош уулу) Сатыбалдиев, Zhantörö Zholdoshevich (Zholdosh uulu) Satybaldiyev; born 6 January 1956) is a Kyrgyz politician who was Prime Minister of Kyrgyzstan from September 2012 until March 2014.

== Early life and education ==
Satybaldiyev was born in Osh, Soviet Union in 1956. He holds a bachelor's degree engineering and construction from Frunze Polytechnic Institute’s which he received in 1979.

== Career ==
The Parliament of Kyrgyzstan elected Satybaldiyev as prime minister on 5 September 2012 by a 111–2 margin. His election came after the coalition of the previous Prime Minister Omurbek Babanov collapsed in August, following allegations of corruption and a sharp contraction in 5% GDP between January and July 2012.

=== Activities ===
Widely seen as a technocrat, Satybaldiyev was elected to restore order and bring back investment and confidence to Kyrgyzstan.

One of the most pressing issues of the Prime Minister faced is the growing calls for the nationalization by the Ata-Zhurt party of the Kumtor Gold Mine. The gold mine owned by the Canadian company Centerra Gold, is one of the most important contributors to Kyrgyzstan's economy, adding nearly 12% to the national GDP. The economic contraction that had been seen over the previous months was largely in response to a drop in output by the mine. The Prime Minister faced growing criticism from the poorer, more nationalist south of the country, especially from Jalal-Abad. However, Satybaldiyev traveled to the mine on 1 October 2012 and gave assurances that it would not be nationalized. Some observers noted that to make good on promises of reducing poverty, nationalization of this company would not make sense.

On 30 May 2013 protesters stormed the mine demanding its nationalization, 50 people were injured. In response Satybaldiyev stated that the government would find ways to increase revenues from the mine, whether they be through taxes or otherwise.

== Post-premiership ==
Satybaldiev was sentenced to seven years in prison on corruption charges stemming from his involvement in a 2013 project to modernize the Bishkek Thermal Power Station. It is alleged that several Kyrgyz officials lobbied on behalf of a Chinese company which performed shoddy work, resulting in the devastating failure of the city's heating and power systems on the coldest day of 2018.

Political offices
Preceded by Aaly Karashev; Acting	Prime Minister of Kyrgyzstan; 2012–2014	Succeeded by Djoomart Otorbaev
