= Aaly =

Aaly is an Asian given name. Notable people with the name include:

- Aaly Karashev (born 1968), Kyrgyz politician
- Aaly Tokombaev (1904–1988), Kyrgyz poet, composer, and writer

== See also ==
- Ally (name)
