= Kadyrbek Atambaev =

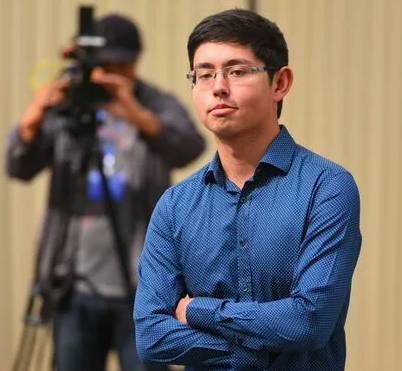
- Born: 26 April 1993 (age 33); Kyrgyzstan
- Education: American University of Central Asia
- Occupation: Leader of deputy fraction
- Organization: Bishkek Parliament
- Political party: Social Democrats (Kyrgyzstan)
- Father: Almazbek Atambaev

Kadyrbek Atambaev (born April,26;1993; Bishkek) is the leader of deputy fraction of Social Democrats in Bishkek parliament, vice-chairman of Social Democrats (Kyrgyzstan), son of former Kyrgyz president Almazbek Atambayev. Leader of the party list of the 2021 parliamentary elections.

== Education and early life ==
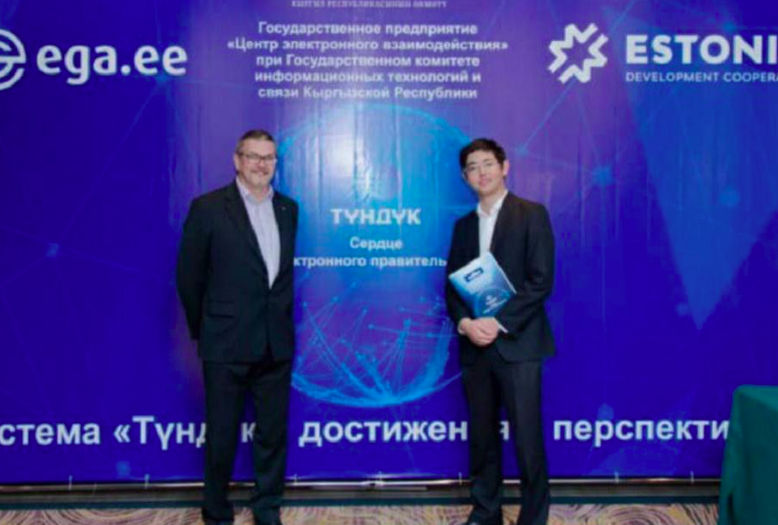
Kadyrbek Atambaev with e-Governance Academy of Estonia management

Graduated from secondary school-gymnasium No. 29 in Bishkek. He graduated with a bachelor's degree in business management from the American University of Central Asia, and completed a master's degree at the Moscow State Institute of International Relations (MGIMO), specializing in Public-Private Partnerships. He wrote a book on industrial policy and economic complexity importance for developing countries in 2015. He completed regular military service in the army of Kyrgyzstan in 2017.

Has received an invitation from Angela Merkel to pass internship in a German think tank, but could not realize it after the storm of his house by military forces and arrest of his father.

=== Work in IT ===
Kadyrbek Atambayev, as a member of the non-governmental organization Citizens' Internet Policy Initiative, worked with the team of the Tunduk interdepartmental electronic interaction system. Kyrgyzstan has become the third X-Road operator in the world after Estonia and Finland. With his direct participation, the X-Road system was upgraded from version 5 to version 6. Atambayev personally interacted with dozens of government agencies, documenting their algorithms for administrative procedures for automation. In 2019, the state-owned enterprise Tunduk received the title “Partner of the Year” from the E-Governance Academy (EGA).

== Political involvement ==
Kadyrbek Atambayev has become actively involved in politics through the Social Democratic Party of Kyrgyzstan (SDPK) after the arrest of his father. He joined the party 10 days after the storming of his father's residence by regular armed forces of 6,000 people on August 7–8 during the Koy-Tash events.

Called on opposition forces to unite after the assault and arrest of his father:

"...this does not mean that we should wait for each of us to come and be tied up. This means that today all opposition forces must understand that the future of the state is at stake. We must show strong resistance to the dictatorship of power. If a coalition of parties wins the next elections - a coalition of opposition against the advancing dictatorship, then we will be able to turn the tide."

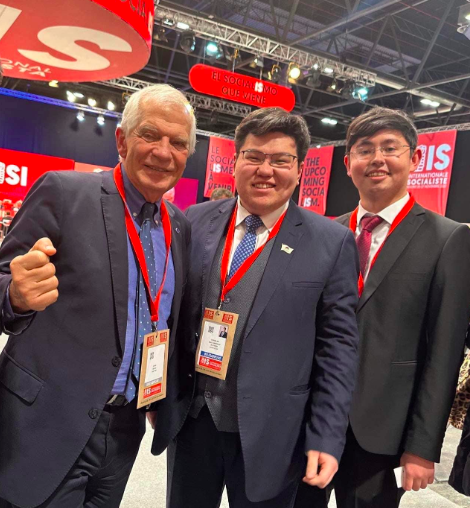
With European Commissioner Josep Borrell and Vice President of the Socialist International Temirlan Sultanbekov

Despite the arrest of the SDPK party headquarters and the party television channel (April TV), he opened a new party office and called his party members to unite.

In 2019, together with his fellow party members, after unfair election results, he announced the protest action and went to Ala-Too Square, which resulted in the Kyrgyz revolution of 2020. Kadyrbek Atambayev released an investigation into the connection of the president’s relatives from the Jeenbekov clan with customs corruption at the South-Western Customs Point through the Southern Technical Inspection. He found out that the case against party members is being conducted by the nephew of President Jeenbekov. Kadyrbek Atambaev was one of the first of the protesters to enter the White House during protests, that resulted in overthrow of president Sooronbay Jeenbekov. He spoke about the torture of his father, ex-president of Kyrgyzstan Almazbek Atambayev, at the congress of the Socialist International in Madrid in 2022. Socialist International Secretary General Luis Ayala visited Kyrgyzstan, where he helped obtain permission to conduct a medical examination.

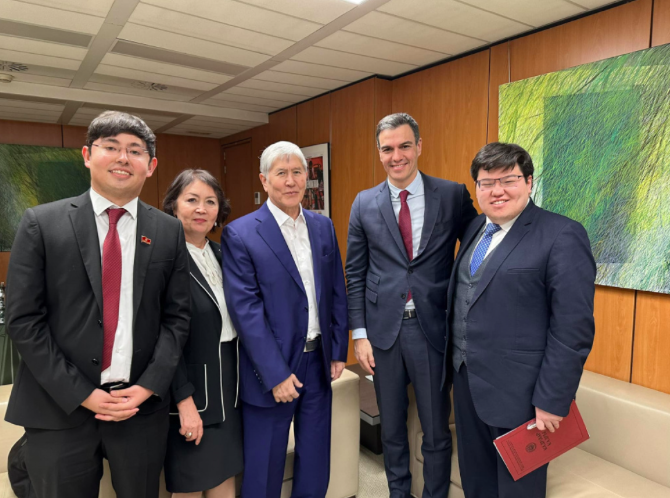
With his father Almazbek Atambaev, after release from prison with help Spanish Prime-Minister Pedro Sanchez

He headed the party list in the elections to the Bishkek Parliament and headed the faction in Bishkek.

Topped the party list in the 2021 parliamentary elections, which ended in vote fraud and “electronic system failure”. He asked a question about the beating of opposition leaders despite a peaceful protest and the authorities bringing in groups to carry out violence against the injured leaders.

== Advocacy and Campaigns ==
Kadyrbek Atambayev has been involved in various campaigns and movements. He has shown particular interest in preserving Bishkek's trolleybus system, arguing against its replacement with more expensive electric buses.

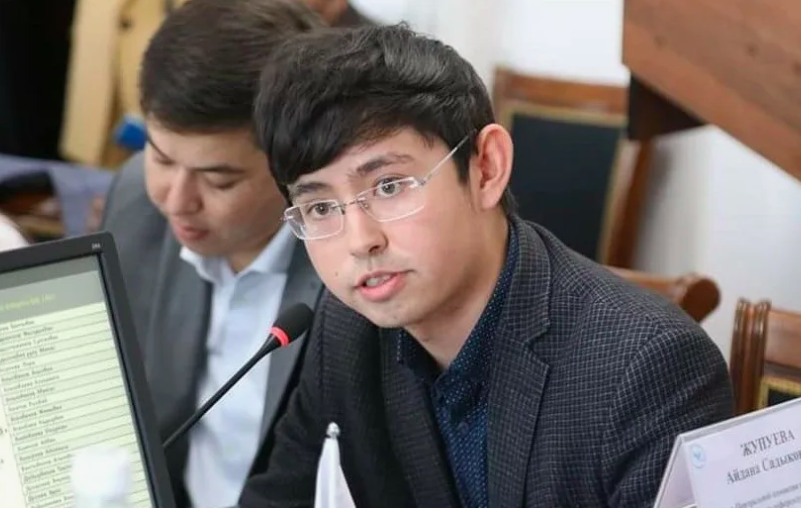
With deputy fraction of Social Democrats

He often speaks in the media on the topics of the corruption, construction mafia, the ecology of Bishkek, water problems, and budgetary independence. Acts as the international secretary of the party's youth wing in the IUSY.

He raised the issue of corruption in Bishkek cemeteries, and subsequently received threats and a lawsuit for libel from the director of the cemetery. Despite the audit of the mayor's office, which confirmed corruption at the cemetery, he was fined by the court. Deputies from the S&D group in European Parliament spoke out in defense of Kadyrbek Atambayev, calling this event unfair.

As an author actively publishes in a number of scientific and analytical publications. His first book and series of articles on German historicism and industrialization were published on the CAA-Network platform. In addition, several works about the X-Road system, city urbanism and book reviews were published on the AKIpress. He published a research paper "Public Entrepreneurship: Innovation Policy and Public-Private Partnership Mechanisms" in the PPP journal at MGIMO.
