= Ömürbek Babanov =

Kyrgyz politician (born 1970)

- Өмүрбек Бабанов
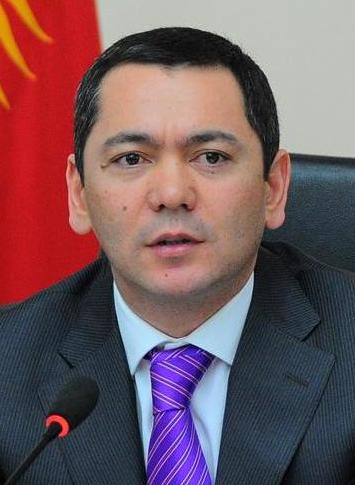
- Babanov in 2011

14th Prime Minister of Kyrgyzstan
- In office 24 December 2011 – 1 September 2012; Acting: 1 December 2011 – 24 December 2011
- President: Almazbek Atambayev
- Preceded by: Almazbek Atambayev
- Succeeded by: Aaly Karashev (Acting)
- In office 23 September 2011 – 14 November 2011; Acting
- President: Roza Otunbayeva
- Preceded by: Almazbek Atambayev
- Succeeded by: Almazbek Atambayev

Personal details
- Born: 20 May 1970 (age 56) Shymkent, Kazakh SSR, USSR
- Party: Respublika-Ata-Zhurt
- Education: Russian State Agricultural University

Ömürbek Toktogulovich Babanov (Note: Kyrgyz: Өмүрбек Токтогул уулу Бабанов, romanized: Ömürbek Totogul uulu Babanov, [ɵmʉɾpék tʰoχtʰoʁʊ́ɫ‿uːɫʊ́ pɑpɑ́nəɸ]) (born 20 May 1970) is a Kyrgyz businessman and politician who served twice as the Prime Minister of Kyrgyzstan briefly from 2011 to 2012. Owner of Mbank and of Asia Cement, a company that co-operates with the Russian nuclear industry.

== Political career ==
Before his appointment as Prime Minister, Babanov was Deputy Prime Minister in the government of Almazbek Atambayev. He was also acting Prime Minister from 23 September 2011 until 14 November 2011, as Prime Minister Atambayev was a candidate in the presidential election. He again became acting Prime Minister on 1 December 2011 when Atambayev took office as President. He was confirmed by Parliament on 23 December 2011. On 1 September 2012 Babanov resigned as Prime Minister.

Babanov participated in Kyrgyzstan's presidential election in 2017 as an independent. During a television debate, candidate Sooronbay Jeenbekov promised to imprison Babanov as part of a proposed fight against corruption. He came second to Jeenbekov with 33% of the vote.

== Activities ==
In the early 2000s, he became one of the founders of the Alliance gas station network. In 2004, the company had 520 petrol stations across Russia and Ukraine. He sold his stake in the business in 2006.

From 2000 to 2005, he was a shareholder of the NTS TV company. From 2010 to 2017, he owned a channel through Ayant LLC.

In 2008, Babanov took over raiding the Bank Kyrgyzstan (now Mbank). On 5 March 2024 Omurbek Babanov became the holder of a 98% stake in Mbank.

In 2014 Babanov became an investor in the Russian cement production plant ‘Asia-Cement’. He owns 100% of the company through PENZA ESTATE LIMITED LIABILITY COMPANY since 2022.

In 2016, it was alleged that Babanov was a co-owner of Alliance Altyn. It was this company that acquired the rights to develop the Djerui gold deposit, considered the second largest in the country.

In 2016, Babanov invested $10-12 million in the Frunze hypermarket chain in exchange for acquiring a 50 per cent stake in the company.

On 24 April 2024, businessman Bolotmambet Jeenbekov, who had previously worked with Omurbek Babanov, accused the latter of fraudulently acquiring a fifty percent stake worth $10 million.

The businessman's relatives own at least 23 companies, including travel, pharmaceutical and construction firms.

== Family and wealth ==
With an estimated wealth of $1.5 billion, he is one of the richest people in Kyrgyzstan.

Babanov is half-Turkish and half-Kyrgyz. His mother was from the Turkish Meskhetian minority group in Georgia; she was forcefully deported from Batumi to Kyrgyzstan during World War II. Babanov's wife is Kazakh. His family's ethnic background were used to smear him during the 2017 election.

== Controversy ==
In 2011, Omurbek Abdrakhmanov, head of one of the commissions investigating the dispute over a controlling stake in mobile operator Megacom, accused Babanov of raiding the company.

On 4 November 2017, Omurbek Babanov's speech during the election campaign became a reason for the Prosecutor's Office of the Kyrgyz Republic to initiate criminal proceedings for allegedly inciting inter-ethnic conflict and the overthrow of the authorities.

After two criminal cases were filed against him, he was in Russia from November 2017 to August 2019.

On 31 May 2021, he was detained as part of an investigation involving the Kumtor Gold Mine.

On 28 November 2023, Kamchybek Tashiev, the Chairman of the State Committee for National Security of Kyrgyzstan, stated that among all those accused in the course of the investigation, only Omurbek Babanov was not held accountable due to the absence of a criminal case against him.

According to earlier information, Mbank cooperates in processing operations with the russian centre Kartstandart (a member of the US sanctioned CFT group) and its affiliate CSI («Си-Эс-Ай»).

It later emerged that Babanov's company, Asia Cement, is working with Russia's nuclear industry.

Babanov himself is reportedly facing potential sanctions over allegations that his company, Asia Cement, is linked to Russia's nuclear industry.

In 2024, international media accused Babanov of removing negative information about his companies' activities from the media.

=== Sanction evasion warehouse ===
In 2023, Russian media reported that a firm linked to the Babanov family would build a warehouse for Russian companies, which would likely use it to circumvent sanctions.

=== Purchase of a passport ===
The leader of the Ar-Namys faction in 2012, Felix Kulov, said that First Deputy Prime Minister Omurbek Babanov admitted to him that he had purchased a Kazakh passport. “I asked Omurbek Babanov about the Kazakh passport and he admitted to me that he bought it because he was doing business in Kazakhstan, and could not return it because he acquired it illegally,” said the head of Ar-Namys. Kazakh media found the passport in the database.

=== Raider takeover of the Kyrgyzstan Bank and NTS TV channel ===
Babanov was repeatedly accused of raider takeovers, using connections with the authorities as the main way to enrich himself. He was accused of the raider seizure of the Kyrgyzstan Bank and the NTS TV channel:

“Today, April 12 [2019], Sharipa Sadybakasova, Kalicha Omuralieva, and several other shareholders held a press conference in Bishkek, accusing Omurbek Babanov—leader of the ‘Respublika’ party—of orchestrating a hostile takeover of JSCB ‘Kyrgyzstan’ in 2008.”

The NTS TV channel was formed on the basis of the VOSST TV and Radio Company, which was owned by the famous businessman Valery Khon under President Askar Akayev. The entrepreneur said that his oil base and television channel were raided by Babanov’s people with the support of the presidential family. After the events of March 2005, the TV channel was re-registered to other persons. Those around Babanov claimed that control of NTS had passed into the hands of the Bakiyev family. And after the April events of 2010, he again returned to Babanov, who, as is known, was on good terms with the head of the “provisional government” Roza Otunbayeva. Parliamentarians stated that the TV channel should have been transferred to the state, and not handed over to Babanov.

== Notes ==
Political offices
Preceded by Almazbek Atambayev	Prime Minister of Kyrgyzstan; Acting; 2011	Succeeded by Almazbek Atambayev
Preceded by Almazbek Atambayev	Prime Minister of Kyrgyzstan; 2011–2012	Succeeded by Aaly Karashev; Acting
