= Djoomart Otorbaev =

Kyrgyzstani politician (born 1955)

- Джоомарт Оторбаев
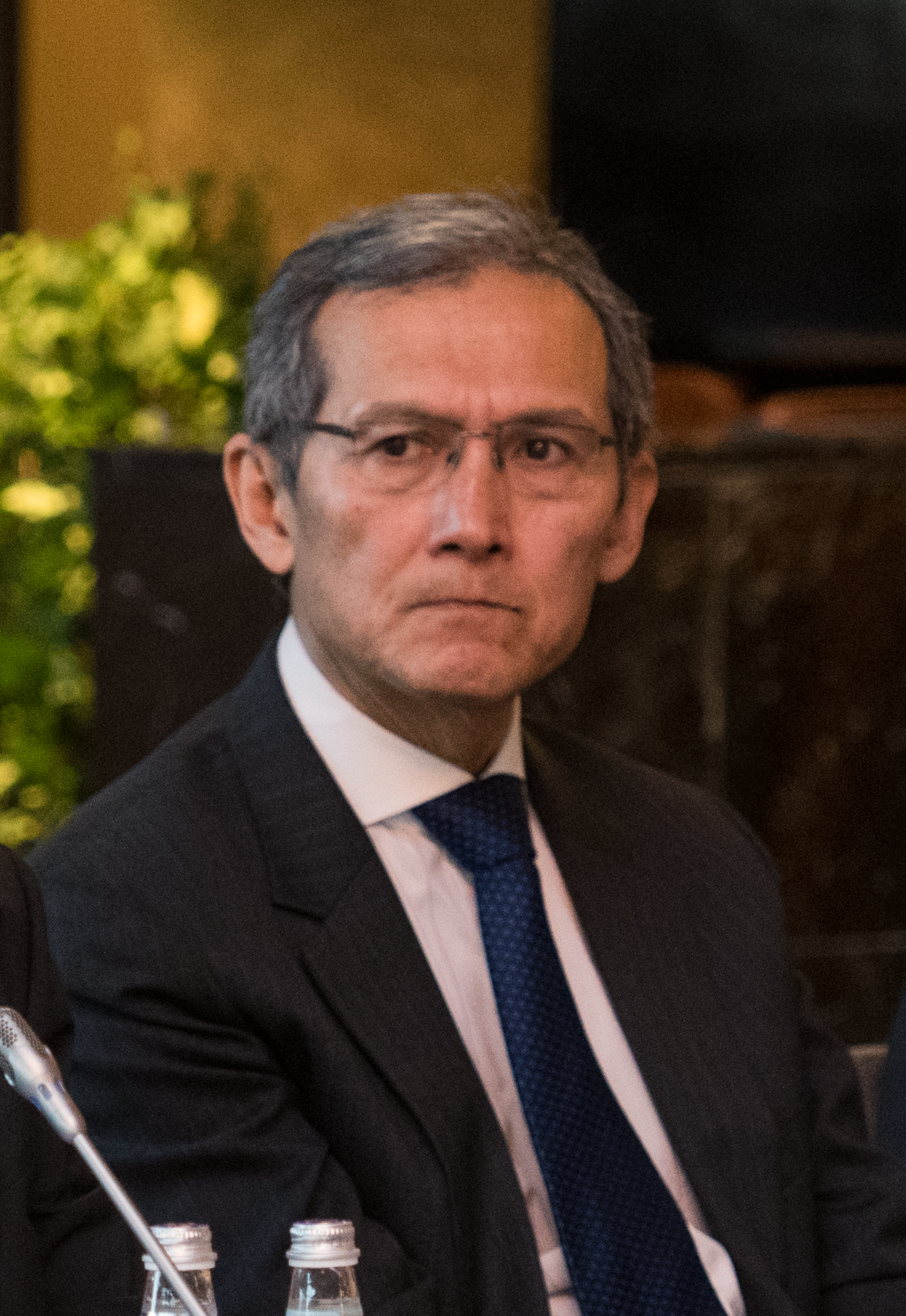
- Otorbaev in 2018

Prime Minister of Kyrgyzstan
- In office 3 April 2014 – 1 May 2015; Acting: 25 March 2014 – 3 April 2014
- President: Almazbek Atambayev
- Preceded by: Zhantoro Satybaldiyev
- Succeeded by: Temir Sariyev

Personal details
- Born: Djoomart Otorbaev; 18 August 1955 (age 71) Frunze, Soviet Union (now Bishkek, Kyrgyzstan)
- Party: Ata Meken
- Education: Saint Petersburg State; University; Russian Academy of Sciences

Djoomart Otorbaev (Kyrgyz: Джоомарт (Кайып уулу) Оторбаев, romanized: Dzhoomart (Kayyp uulu) Otorbaev born 18 August 1955) was the Prime Minister of Kyrgyzstan. On 25 March 2014 he replaced Zhantoro Satybaldiyev as acting prime minister until a new government was formed. On 3 April 2014, he was officially named prime minister. On 23 April 2015 he resigned.

== Early life and education ==
Otorbaev was born on August 18, 1955, in Frunze (now Bishkek) to a family of scientists. His father, Professor Kaip Otorbaev, was a former rector at Kyrgyz National University, while his mother, Professor Maria Nanaeva, worked as a head of the department at the Kyrgyz State Medical Academy. In 1978 he graduated with honours from Leningrad State University with a degree in physics and received his PhD in 1981 at the Lebedev Physical Institute of the USSR Academy of Sciences (Moscow). In 1989 he received the degree of Doctor of Sciences at the Institute of General Physics USSR Academy of Sciences (Moscow). In 1990, he received the degree of Professor of Physics from the High Attestation Commission (VAK) of the USSR. From 1981 to 2005, he worked as a junior, senior researcher, then head of the laboratory of the National Academy of Sciences, a teacher, senior lecturer, and professor at Kyrgyz State University. Between 1992 and 1996, he worked as an invited Professor at the Department of Physics, Eindhoven University of Technology in the Netherlands. From 1996 to 2002, he worked as CEO of Philips Electronics in the Kyrgyz Republic and Deputy CEO of Philips Electronics in Central Asia.

== Political career ==
In 2001, he was appointed as an Adviser to the President - the Special Representative of the President of Kyrgyzstan on attracting investments. He also served as the President's Special Representative for Economic Assistance to Afghanistan. From April 2006 till December 2011, he worked as a Senior Adviser of the European Bank for Reconstruction and Development (EBRD), based in London. In this role, he was directly involved in the organization of high-level policy dialogues in such post-Soviet countries as Georgia, Armenia, Moldova, Tajikistan, as well as in Mongolia. He was the Deputy Prime Minister of Kyrgyzstan for Economics and Investments from 2002 to 2005 and from December 2011 to September 2012. On 6 September 2012, he became Kyrgyzstan's First Deputy Prime Minister. During these years, he was the Governor of Kyrgyzstan in the World Bank Group, the Asian Development Bank, and the European Bank for Reconstruction and Development. On 26 March 2014, Otorbaev was appointed as acting prime minister of Kyrgyzstan after the parliamentary coalition broke up and former prime minister Zhantoro Satybaldiev resigned on 25 March. On 3 April, out of the 115 members of Parliament present, 104 voted to support Otorbaev and his government's program. In his keynote speech, Otorbaev assured the Parliament that the main goal of the Government of Kyrgyzstan would be to restore the trust in him on the part of the nation and the people. He outlined the improvement of the investment climate in the country and the fight against corruption as the priority of work, saying that all state institutions should work in unity: “There will be simple priority in my work - specific goals will be set for the heads of ministries, those who cannot fulfil them will be fired."On 4 April, President Almazbek Atambayev signed a decree appointing a new government under the leadership of Prime Minister Otorbaev. On 23 April 2015, after an annual report to Parliament on his work as Prime Minister and positive approval of his government's performance, he resigned for political reasons.

== Current activity ==
Otorbaev is a member of the Board of Trustees at the Kyrgyz National University. He is an honorary member and invited speaker at a few international boards and forums on development and investment and a distinguished professor at several foreign universities. He writes regularly for various media such as Project Syndicate, China Daily, Valdai Discussion Club and others.

His book, "Central Asia's Economic Rebirth in the Shadow of the New Great Game", was published in 2023 by Routledge in the UK. The Book (416 pages and 99 illustrations) brings to light the development of Central Asia as defined by its landlocked geography. Particular attention is also paid to the achievements and challenges of the region’s post-Soviet economic and political transformation and its relationship with the participants in the New Great Game. It raises questions pertaining to Eurasian powers that circle Central Asia; how will this affect the region? Will Central Asia join the powerful locomotive of history, or will it remain on the sidelines?

Michel Camdessus, Former Managing Director of the International Monetary Fund and Former Governor of the Bank of France, wrote the foreword for the book. Horst Köhler, former President of Germany; Václav Klaus, former Prime Minister and President of the Czech Republic; Petar Stoyanov, former President of the Republic of Bulgaria; Boris Tadić, former President of Serbia; Valdis Zatlers, former President of Latvia, Ehud Barak, former Prime Minister of Israel, Philippe Le Houérou, Chairman of the French Development Agency (AFD), former Vice-President of the World Bank (WB) and CEO of International Finance Corporation (IFC), Amre Moussa, former Secretary-General of the Arab League and former Minister of Foreign Affairs, Egypt, Takehiko Nakao, former President of Asian Development Bank and S. Frederick Starr, Chairman of Central Asia-Caucasus Institute in Washington, wrote endorsements for the book.

In June 2026, Otorbaev was elected as an inaugural member of the International Advisory Board of the Caixin Global Forum. Other members of the International Advisory Board include James Liang, co-founder and executive chairman of Trip.com Group; Li Dongsheng, founder and chairman of TCL; John L. Thornton, chairman of Barrick Gold Corp.; Dowson Tong, senior executive vice president of Tencent; Yao Ming, former chairman of the Chinese Basketball Association; and others. The forum will bring together similar initiatives sponsored by Caixin with the stated goal of forming "a year-round dialogue framework across major global cities.".

Political offices
Preceded by Zhantoro Satybaldiyev	Prime Minister of Kyrgyzstan; 2014–2015	Succeeded by Temir Sariyev
