= 2019 Kyrgyz protests =

Koy-Tash events; clashes between opposition and president

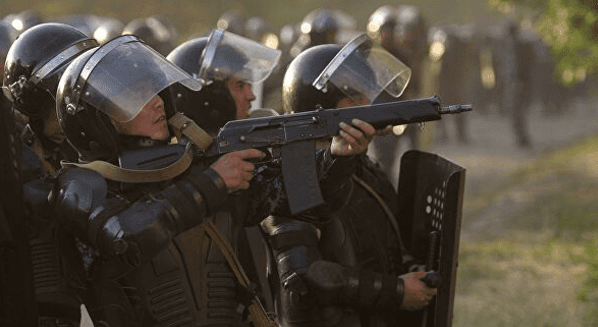
- Date: August 7, 2019 - August 9, 2019
- Location: Koy-Tash, Alamüdün District, Chüy Region, Kyrgyzstan

Parties
Government of Kyrgyzstan: Law enforcement	Atambayev Supporters

Lead figures
Sooronbay Jeenbekov	Almazbek Atambayev

The Koy-Tash events is a term referred to a series of political events that took place in August 2019 in the village of Koy-Tash, Kyrgyzstan. These events were associated with an attempt to detain the former President of the country, Almazbek Atambayev, which led to clashes between his supporters and security forces. This was a key moment in the modern history of Kyrgyzstan, which revealed the depth of political tension in the country and sparked numerous discussions about the legitimacy of the authorities' actions and human rights and led to the overthrow of President Sooronbay Jeenbekov in October 2020.

== Background ==
Since President Almazbek Atambayev left office on 24 November 2017 and handed the presidency to his successor and former prime minister Sooronbay Jeenbekov, he has served as head of the SDPK. International media called it the first peaceful transfer of power in Kyrgyzstan. In his post presidency Atambayev got back to the political arena, most notably by criticizing his own successor. This criticism, which began in the spring of 2018, has mostly revolved around Jeenbekov's establishment of family clan regime. By that time, the media began to dazzle with headlines about the family-clan regime of Jeenbekov and dozens of his relatives in the highest state apparatus, embassies and parliament.

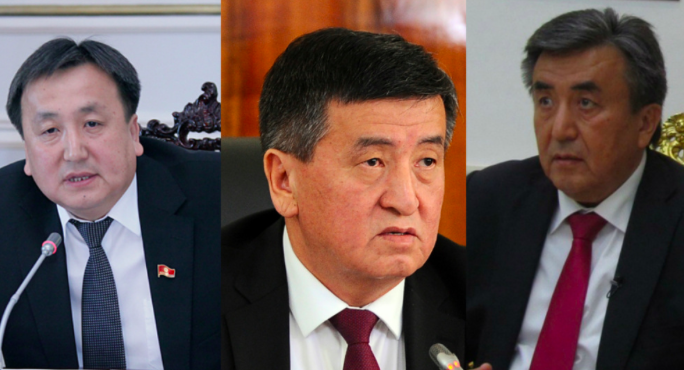
The Jeenbekov brothers - Asylbek and Zhusupzhan - widely influenced the political vertical of power in Kyrgyzstan, causing accusations of family-clan dictatorship

President Sooronbay Jeenbekov retained the high posts of his relatives, Ambassador Zhusup Jeenbekov and deputy Asylbek Jeenbekov, who became very influential figures in the country although they promised to the public that if Sooronbay Jeenbekov was elected president they would leave high government posts. 5 months after Sooronbay Jeenbekov took office as President of the Kyrgyz Republic, at the SDPK congress, the delegates of the congress recommended Asylbek Jeenbekov to immediately surrender the mandate of the deputy of the Jogorku Kenesh of the Kyrgyz Republic. But there was no reaction from the Jeenbekovs.

On 17 March, Atambayev expressed regret by saying: "I apologize to everyone for bringing this person to power".

In March 2019, Atambayev officially announced that he was going into opposition to the current President Jeenbekov.

=== Constitutional Chamber ===
In June 2019, MPs voted to strip Atambayev of his presidential immunity and called for the pursuit of criminal charges on him. Before that, in February, Head of Constitutional Chamber Erkinbek Mamyrov publicly made a statement that “there is no retroactivity of law” and Atambayev can not be deprived of presidential immunity in accordance with the Law of the Kyrgyz Republic of May 15, 2019 on amendments to the Law of the Kyrgyz Republic “On Guarantees for the Activities of the President of the Kyrgyz Republic”. The chairman of the Constitutional Chamber Mamyrov was replaced by an assistant to the president's brother - Asylbek Jeenbekov - in parliament.

In response, Atambayev told reporters at his residence in Koy-Tash that he would wait for decision of Constitutional Chamber and protect his constitutional rights: "The Constitutional Court must put an end to the question of the legality or illegality of interrogation". At that time he was still guarded by state security officers, since his complaint to Constitutional Court was under consideration and he was entitled to state protection.

== Course of events ==
=== Beginning ===
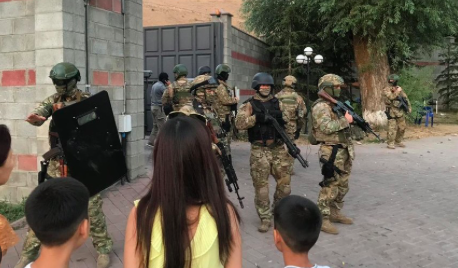
Special forces attack civilians in the residence

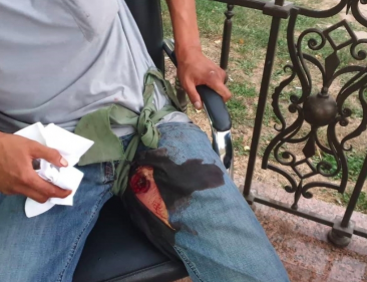
Bullet wounds on civilians

In the courtyard of Atambayev's house in the village of Koi-Tash, from 18:30 on August 7, 2019, a lecture by expert Bolot Aitkulov began, which gathered people. At about 19:50, without any warning, climbing over the fence into the Atambayev's courtyard, unknown persons in military uniforms, wearing masks and carrying weapons invaded. They immediately began shooting at civilians, as well as brutally beating them The requests of the elderly, women and children to let them out of Atambayev's house were ignored, moreover, all people were herded into the Conference Hall. In the events of August 7–8, about a thousand ordinary citizens suffered various injuries. Head of the State Committee for National Security, Opumbaev, stated that he was very sorry that he did not give the order to shoot at citizens to kill.

Actions by the armed men against civilians provoked a mass gathering of citizens around Atambayev's house. People also began to flock to the place to rescue their relatives meeting with Atambayev.

=== Next day ===
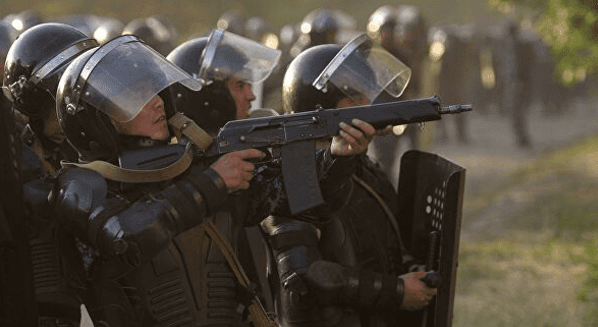
Military forces with combat weapons in Koy Tash, 8th of August

On August 8, 2019, during a repeated attempt to capture Atambayev, law enforcement officers burned mountain pastures, which caused irreparable damage to the livestock sector of the villages. In Koi-Tash, special services left special equipment on the territory of other private houses and smashed windows. The means used against citizens caused irreparable damage to the psychological and physical health of people.

President Sooronbay Jeenbekov, speaking in the Jogorku Kenes, admitted that he personally led the operation and chose the assault option.

=== Mass arrests and beating ===
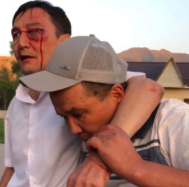
Beaten politician Nurbek Kassymbekov

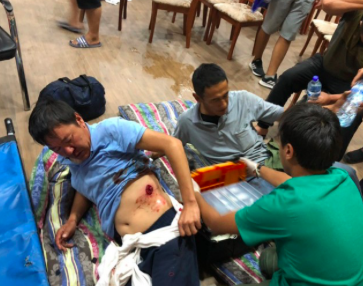
Injured civilians. Bullet wounds

On September 9, 2019, 1700 people turned to the General Prosecutor's Office with a collective appeal and a request to initiate criminal cases against the head of the State Committee for National Security Orozbek Opumbaev, the leaders of the Alpha special forces and the Minister of Internal Affairs Kashkar Dzhunushaliev. Radio Azattyk (RFE/RL) reported that more than 1000 of local people were injured and suffered during the assault.

Among the victims were well-known statesmen and political figures, for example, deputy of the Jogorku Kenesh of the 5th convocation, ex-permanent representative of the President of the Kyrgyz Republic in the Constitutional Chamber of the Supreme Court N.A. Kassymbekov (fracture of 7 ribs, bruises and injuries to the eyes and facial part), ex-deputy of the 6th convocation of the Jogorku Kenesh of the Kyrgyz Republic Miskenbaev M., as well as many ordinary citizens, such as Almanbetov D. (gunshot wound of the chest), Namazaliev (through bullet wound of the chest), Sharshenaliev A. (chemical burn of the left leg), Ismailova E. (chemical burn), Osmonalieva K. (gunshot wound of the shin), Kydyrbaev A. (dislocation of the jaw, Esenbaev K. (bullet wound of the shin), Kydyraliev B. (bullet wound of the th laziness), Kamchybek U. K. (open bullet wound), Osmonaliev K. (gunshot wound of the shin), Satybekova S. (fracture of the ulna), Medetbekov S. (gunshot wound of the groin), Sharshenbaev B. (bullet wound of the anterior surface of the lower leg), Imankulov T. (gunshot wound of the gastrocnemius muscle of the lower leg, chest, back), Berdibaev T. ( broken rib), Kakebaev L. (bullet wound of the left forearm), Toktomushev G. (open head injury), Beishenbek u. Y. (gunshot wound of the chest), Choidiev (shoulder wound) and many others.

Members of the SDPK Political Council were also arrested: ex-head of the Office of the President of the Kyrgyz Republic Farid Niyazov, ex-adviser to the speaker of parliament Alga Kylychov, chairman of the public organization of the heroes of the April Revolution of 2010 Amantur Zhamgyrchiev, former deputy akim of the Issyk-Ata district Kyyaz Smailov. F. Baabiyev, a member of the SDPK, who was twice wounded the day before, was also arrested.

=== Arrest of party offices and TV channel ===
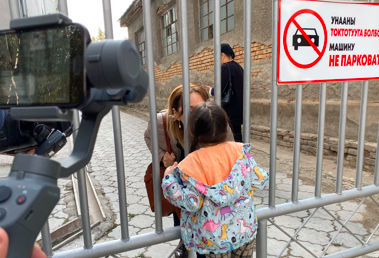
Party member and journalist Kunduz Joldubaeva in front of pretrial detention center

On August 9, 2019, special forces illegally arrested the office of the Social Democratic Party of Kyrgyzstan and April TV channel. All documents of the party, all organizational equipment and other property belonging to the Social Democratic Party of Kyrgyzstan wereconfiscated. Having received information about SDPK members throughout the country on the computers and servers of the SDPK, the special services began to call all SDPK members throughout the country for interrogations. The OSCE called on the Kyrgyz authorities to leave the April TV channel alone and stop violating freedom of speech.

Subsequently, 1,700 people sent an appeal to the General Prosecutor's Office of the Kyrgyz Republic with a request to initiate a criminal case against President Jeenbekov. In response to this, on the contrary, all these 1,700 people began to be called in for interrogations and they were exerted to strong pressure, by uttering warnings and threats. On 13 August, Orozbek Opumbayev, the head of the State Committee for National Security (SCNS), said Atambayev was plotting to topple the government before he was taken into custody.

=== Assassination attempt ===
Kursan Asanov, vice-minister of Internal Affairs and head of Atambaev`s arrest operation, told that during the storm of his residence in August 2019, when more than a thousand of representatives of law enforcement agencies stormed his house in Koy-Tash, there was an order "not to take ex-president Atambaev alive".

=== Torture ===
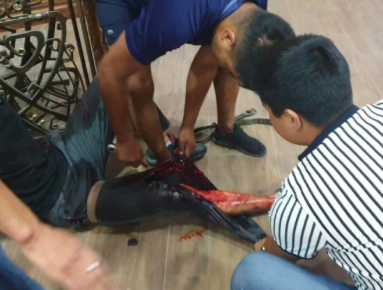
Injured civilian. Bullet wound

Alga Kylychov, member of political council of the SDPK, claimed that he was beaten, a bag was put on his head, and other tools of pressure were used by the authorities on his family, which was documented by NGO, video recordings and documentation. He gave an interview to Radio Free Europe/Radio Liberty in which he specifically described the way of tortures by Special Forces of Kyrgyz Republic in the prisons of Kyrgyzstan conducted on Atambaev`s supporters and members of Social Democratic party. His son, Kadyrbek Atambaev, spoke about torture in prison at the Socialist International Summit in Madrid.

== Consequences ==
=== International support ===
On November 25–27, 2022 on Congress of Socialist International in Madrid, the declaration on Kyrgyzstan has been accepted by 93 political parties that stated: “Non-investigation by the procurator and the court of the facts of inflicting severe injuries and the use of brute force using weapons, including cold weapons, against 1,700 civilians in Koi-Tash on August 7–8, suggests an unfair trial, the purpose of which is to cover up the crimes of the previous heads of special services - Opumbaev and Zhunushaliev. The Socialist International notes that these actions of the armed forces against the civilian population fall under the articles of “war crime”, as well as “crime against humanity”, which is an internationally investigated case. If the statements of the affected citizens continue to be ignored, the organization will be forced to assist in the international investigation.”

In August 2023, the issue of the Koy-Tash events was raised in the European Parliament. Deputy Chairman of the Party of European Socialists Katarína Roth Neveďalová said that “people have been distracted from work for four years and are tired of going to court.” She also noted that law enforcement agencies of Kyrgyzstan have still not answered the questions of 1,700 citizens who complained about the actions of security forces on August 7–8, 2019, and have not yet begun an investigation. Bishkek did not respond to these statements.

=== Revolution and overthrow of Jeenbekov ===
The Koi-Tash events played a significant role in the political dynamics of Kyrgyzstan, which eventually led to a revolution in October 2020. After a series of protests sparked by allegations of fraudulent parliamentary elections, President Jeenbekov was forced to resign.

In 2025, Atambayev was sentenced in absentia to 11 years imprisonment for charges that included involvement in mass unrest related to the protests.
