= Almazbek Atambayev =

President of Kyrgyzstan from 2011 to 2017

- Алмазбек Атамбаев
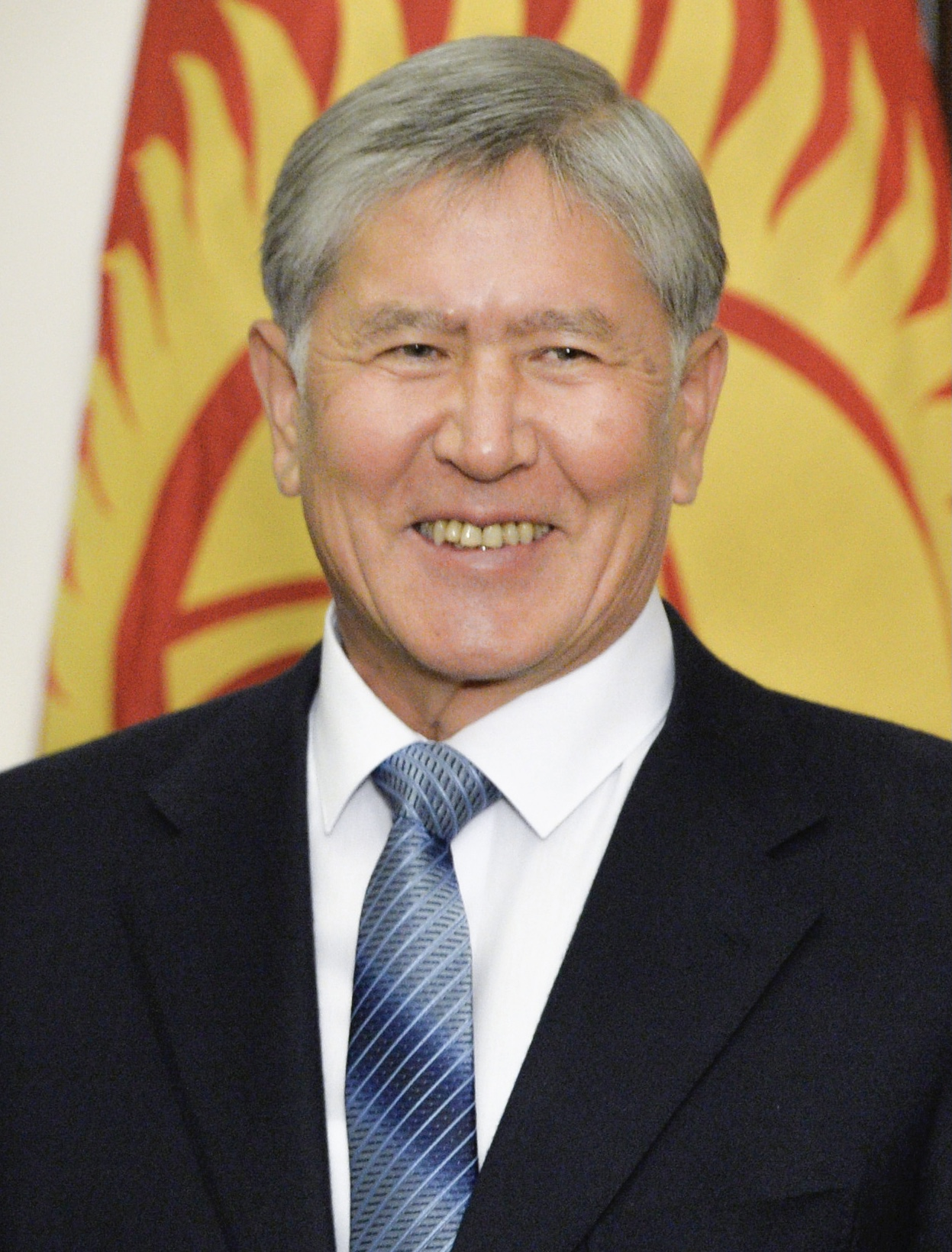
- Atambayev in 2017

4th President of Kyrgyzstan
- In office 1 December 2011 – 24 November 2017
- Prime Minister: Omurbek Babanov; Aaly Karashev (Acting); Zhantoro Satybaldiyev; Djoomart Otorbaev; Temir Sariyev; Sooronbay Jeenbekov; Muhammetkaliy Abulgaziyev (Acting); Sapar Isakov
- Preceded by: Roza Otunbayeva
- Succeeded by: Sooronbay Jeenbekov

11th Prime Minister of Kyrgyzstan
- In office 14 November 2011 – 1 December 2011
- President: Roza Otunbayeva
- Preceded by: Omurbek Babanov (Acting)
- Succeeded by: Omurbek Babanov
- In office 17 December 2010 – 23 September 2011
- President: Roza Otunbayeva
- Preceded by: Daniar Usenov
- Succeeded by: Omurbek Babanov (Acting)
- In office 29 March 2007 – 28 November 2007
- President: Kurmanbek Bakiyev
- Preceded by: Azim Isabekov
- Succeeded by: Iskenderbek Aidaraliyev (Acting)

Personal details
- Born: Almazbek Sharshen uulu Atambayev; 17 September 1956 (age 70) Arashan, Kirghiz SSR, Soviet Union (now Kyrgyzstan)
- Party: Social Democrats
- Other political affiliations: Social Democratic Party (membership suspended as of May 2019)
- Spouse(s): Buazhar; Raisa Atambayeva
- Children: 10
- Education: State University of Management
- Website: http://atambaev.kg/

Almazbek Sharshen uulu Atambayev (Note: Kyrgyz: Алмазбек Шаршен уулу Атамбаев) (born 17 September 1956) is a Kyrgyzstani politician who served as the fourth president of Kyrgyzstan from 2011 to 2017. He previously served as the 11th prime minister of Kyrgyzstan from 2010 to 2011, and from 2007 to 2007 and Chairman of the Social Democratic Party of Kyrgyzstan (SDPK) from 1999 to 2011.

Unlike most elected presidents of the Central Asian countries, Almazbek Atambayev did not try to extend his powers after the term specified by the Constitution and peacefully transferred power, marking the first such precedent in the history of modern Central Asia. Under him, the country passed a constitutional reform that strengthened the role of the parliament, and also introduced a biometric election system, carried out with the help of the European Union.

== Personal life ==
Almazbek Atambaev was born in 1956 in the northern region of Chüy. His father, Sharshen Atambayev, was a veteran of World War II who served with the Red Army on the front lines in Eastern Europe. Atambaev received his degree in economics while studying at the Moscow Institute of Management. He has four children from his marriage to his first wife Buazhar. In 1988 he married his second wife, Raisa, with whom he has six children: daughters Aliya (born 1997), Diana, and Dinara, and sons Seyit, Seytek, and Khadyrbek (born 1993). Raisa is an ethnic Tatar, born in Osh. She is a doctor.

In January 2018, he published a song he authored called "Kyrgyzstan", which was later rewritten by Azerbaijani performer Araz Elses.

== Political career (2000–2010) ==
Atambayev was an unsuccessful candidate in the October 2000 presidential election, receiving 6% of the vote. He served as the Minister of Industry, Trade and Tourism in the government from 20 December 2005 until he resigned on 21 April 2006.

In November 2006 he was one of the leaders of anti-government protests in Bishkek, under the umbrella of the movement 'For Reform!' (За Реформы). He was also involved in earlier protests in late April 2006.

On 26 December 2006 Atambayev rejected calls from other lawmakers for a dissolution of the Supreme Council, saying, "It is impossible for this Parliament to be dissolved at least until May [2007], and it has to adopt all the laws. Otherwise there will be a war in Kyrgyzstan, because even if Parliament adopts the [proposed] authoritarian constitution, I will tell you openly, we will not accept it. It would be a constitution adopted illegally. Then we would take every [possible protest action]. We are ready for that."

Following the resignation of Prime Minister Azim Isabekov on 29 March 2007, Atambayev was appointed acting Prime Minister by President Kurmanbek Bakiyev. He was then confirmed in parliament by a vote of 48–3 on 30 March. He is the first prime minister in Central Asia to come from an opposition party. On 11 April, he tried to address a large protest in Bishkek demanding Bakiyev's resignation, but was booed by the protesters.

Bakiyev announced the resignation of Atambayev's government on 24 October 2007, following a constitutional referendum. The government was to remain in office until after a parliamentary election in December. Nonetheless, Atambayev resigned on 28 November 2007; Bakiyev accepted the resignation, while praising Atambayev for his performance in office, and appointed Acting First Deputy Prime Minister Iskenderbek Aidaraliyev in his place as Acting Prime Minister. Edil Baisalov of the Social Democratic Party claimed that Atambayev was forced out of office because he was an obstacle to alleged government interference in the parliamentary election.

Almazbek Atambayev, who was at the helm of the Social Democratic Party of Kyrgyzstan, played a key role in the Tulip Revolution of 2005. Tulip was a symbol of Kyrgyz Social Democratic party in 2005. With his active participation in protests and decisive speeches against corruption and authoritarianism, he became a leading force for democratic change. Atambayev oriented his party towards the fight for the establishment of a rule of law and justice, attracting many supporting citizens. Under his leadership, the Social Democratic Party actively supported and mobilized protesters, becoming one of the organizers of mass rallies that ultimately led to the overthrow of President Askar Akayev. Atambayev used his position to call for democratic reforms and the improvement of human rights in the country.

On 20 April 2009, Atambayev was announced as a candidate for the July 2009 presidential elections.

But on polling day Atambayev withdrew his candidacy claiming "widespread fraud": "Due to massive, unprecedented violations, we consider these elections illegitimate and a new election should be held".

== Political career (2010–2011) ==
Following the 2010 parliamentary election, he was chosen to be Prime Minister at the head of a coalition government with his SDPK, Respublika, and Ata-Zhurt (which won a plurality in the election).

Atambayev ran in 2011 to succeed Roza Otunbayeva as President of Kyrgyzstan. On election day, 30 October 2011, he won in a landslide, defeating Adakhan Madumarov from the Butun Kyrgyzstan party and Kamchybek Tashiev from the Ata-Zhurt party with 63% of the vote from about 60% of the eligible Kyrgyz population voting.

== Presidency (2011–2017) ==
=== Inauguration ===
He was inaugurated on 1 December 2011. It took place in the National Philharmonic Hall in Bishkek. The ceremony was attended by the President of Turkey, Abdullah Gul, Prime Minister of Kazakhstan Karim Massimov, Prime Minister of Azerbaijan Artur Rasizade and President of Georgia, Mikheil Saakashvili. The attendance of the head of the Presidential Administration of Russia Sergey Naryshkin and the Head of Chechnya Ramzan Kadyrov was expected, however they could not and instead sent lower level Russian Foreign Ministry officials in their place. During his inaugural speech, he said the following about the future of Kyrgyzstan:

"Today we are writing a new story. This is not the history of the president, but a new history of our country."

The ceremony budget cost less than half of what was spent for inauguration ceremony of Kurmanbek Bakiev in August 2009, costing about 10 million soms ($217,000 in US Dollars). Unlike the breastplates used for the inaugurations of Akaev, Bakiyev and Otunbayeva, which were framed with diamonds and pearls, the jewelers decided not to use the gems in the 108 centimeter long breastplate as it was considered to be an "imported" element in the national culture.

=== Democratic rankings ===
During Almazbek Atambaev's presidency (2011–2017) and the Social Democratic Party's period in government (2010–2017), political party founded and led by Almazbek Atambaev, Kyrgyzstan posted some of the steepest gains recorded by major democracy and governance indices. In Reporters Without Borders’ World Press Freedom Index the country climbed 70 places—from 159th to 89th—ranking second worldwide for improvement over that span. Freedom House's Freedom in the World score rose by roughly 20 points (on the 0–100 scale), shifting the assessment from "Not Free" toward "Partly Free" and placing Kyrgyzstan among only 8 global improvers in that span, on 5th place by point gain. The Economist Intelligence Unit's Democracy Index from 2011 to 2017 increased by about 1.49 points and 21 ranks (from 3.62 to 5.11), also within the top-ten improvers, while Transparency International's Corruption Perceptions Index improved by approximately 9 points and 29 places (from 22/100 to 29/100), a top-20 advance among 180 states. Taken together, these movements across press freedom, political rights and civil liberties, and institutional performance mark 2011–2017 as an unusual period of democratic indicator growth for Kyrgyzstan relative to both regional peers and broader global trends.

While SDPK held the majority in the Jogorku Kenesh, Kyrgyzstan became the first—and still the only—Central-Asian legislature to receive "Partner for Democracy" status from the Parliamentary Assembly of the Council of Europe (PACE). The certificate was handed over in Strasbourg on 24 June 2014, with PACE President Anne Brasseur hailing the country's commitment to open, multi-party government.

During Atambaev's presidency, parliament unanimously adopted a stand-alone law creating Central Asia's first fully independent National Preventive Mechanism under the UN Optional Protocol against Torture. Kyrgyzstan entered the world's top ten with the best NPM (National Preventive Mechanism) system for the prevention of torture, represented by the National Center of the Kyrgyz Republic for the Prevention of Torture, this was stated in the Verbal Note of the Office of the UN High Commissioner for Human Rights.

=== Opinions on presidential term ===
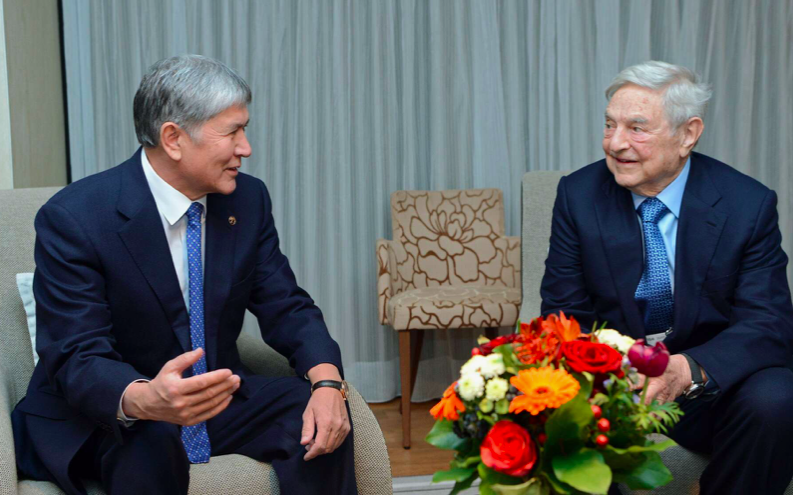
George Soros and Almazbek Atambaev

George Soros spoke positively about Almazbek Atambayev, stating that "Kyrgyzstan was lucky to have a non-corrupt president", noting that the coming to power of a person who is not mired in corruption is good for the democratic development of the country. Alexander Soros positively reviewed digitalization efforts of Kyrgyz government in Taza Koom project. Vladimir Putin characterized Almazbek Atambayev as a person who "keeps his word... It is sometimes difficult to agree on something with him, but if something has already been agreed, he goes to the end in fulfilling the agreements reached."

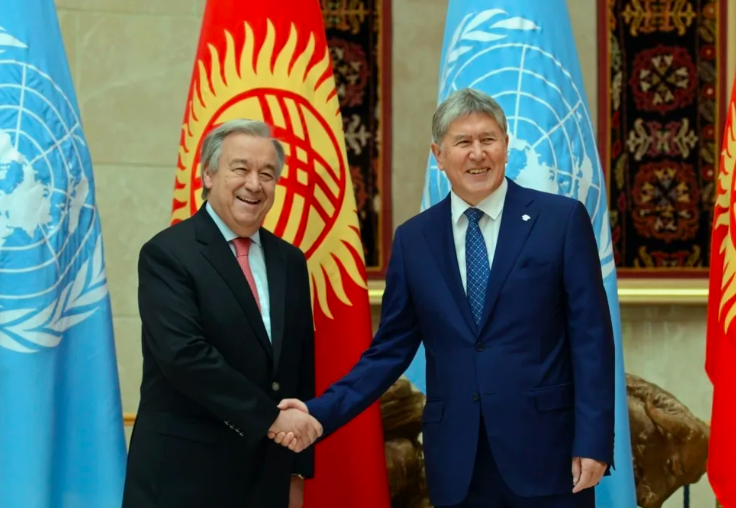
Antonio Guterres, General Secretary of UN, in Kyrgyzstan

At the end of presidential term of Atambaev, UN Secretary-General António Guterres visited Kyrgyzstan and stated:

"I was convinced that Kyrgyzstan and the people of the country are committed to the ideas of the rule of human rights, democracy, and this was actually an important choice for the Kyrgyz people."

=== Domestic policy ===
In November 2015, the Ministry of Defense was re-branded as the State Committee for Defense Affairs on Atambayev's orders while transferring authority over the Armed Forces of the Kyrgyz Republic to the General Staff, with the Chief of the General Staff exercising his/her authority as the paramount leader of the military and the second in command to the president. In December 2016, Atambayev signed a decree officially abolishing the use of military courts in Kyrgyzstan. Atambaev presided over a constitutional referendum which proposed that the increasing the powers of the Prime Minister and his/her government, as well as reforms to the judicial system. International experts positively assessed the transition to a parliamentary form of government by constitutional reform, the strengthening of the role of the prime minister and parliament thanks to the constitutional reform, as well as the fact that it was supposed to stabilize the institution of power as opposed to the growing spread of Islamist ideology in the country. It also clarified the validity of the marriage contract in Kyrgyzstan as laid out by the previous constitution. The changes were approved with a landslide majority of close to 80% of the Kyrgyz population.

Atambayev chose to step away from the second presidential term and abide the Constitution despite Russian president Vladimir Putin and Kazakh President Nursultan Nazarbayev asking him to stay in power:

"Russian President Vladimir Putin and Kazakh President Nursultan Nazarbayev asked me to stay for a second term, but I explained that I could not, because we have a different people. People will choose the one whom they consider the most worthy."

=== Record in positive progress in media freedom ===
According to Reporters Without Borders (RSF), Kyrgyzstan rose from 159th place in 2010 to 89th in 2017, gaining 70 positions in seven years—second only to Fiji in progress on freedom of speech during that period. By the end of Atambaev's presidency in 2017, Kyrgyzstan's RSF score (69.08) was on par with that of Greece (69.11), a European Union member, and surpassed the scores of countries such as Israel, Bulgaria, Ukraine, and North Macedonia. Kyrgyzstan also topped the regional list of countries for freedom of speech in Central Asian region.

Following the April People's Revolution in 2010 and the fall of the Bakiyev regime, the transition to a new government with a strong role played by social democrats led to an immediate improvement, with Kyrgyzstan rising to 109th place in 2011 alone. These advances were credited not only to press freedom but also to institutional reforms, including the strengthening of the parliamentary system and the introduction of biometric elections.

=== Gender policy ===
Under Almazbek Atambayev's leadership, significant strides were made in gender equality in Kyrgyzstan. A 33% quota for women's representation in parliamentary lists was introduced. Additionally, a 30% quota for women's representation in local councils was established, increasing female political participation.

During Atambaev's presidency women were also appointed to top positions for the first time in history - such as General Prosecutor, Chief Justice of the Supreme Court, and Chair of the Defense Committee in Parliament.

Key laws were passed, including the Maternity Law, the Domestic Violence Law, and social benefits for childbirth. Mother's Day was officially established as a national holiday.

Maternal and child health centers, mammology centers, women's oncology centers, and gynecological disease centers were built across the country, enhancing healthcare for women.

In addition, Atambayev actively pursued a secular policy, opposing the processes of Islamization in the country, thereby supporting the principle of separation of religion and state. Despite public pressure from Islamic theologians and the muftiate, Atambayev spoke out in defense of the rights of Kyrgyz women to dress as they wish:

"Listen, since the 50s, women in Kyrgyzstan have been wearing miniskirts, but none of these women have ever thought of putting on a suicide belt and blowing someone up. Go ahead and wear a tarpaulin boot on your head, but don't blow anyone up. Because that's not a religion. The essence of every religion is kindness, a kind attitude towards people. If you think that someone's head should be cut off or that someone should be forced to wear what they should wear, that's not a religion. We must fight this. Let them wear miniskirts, but don't blow anyone up. Because the main problem in the world today is terrorism."

=== Biometric elections ===
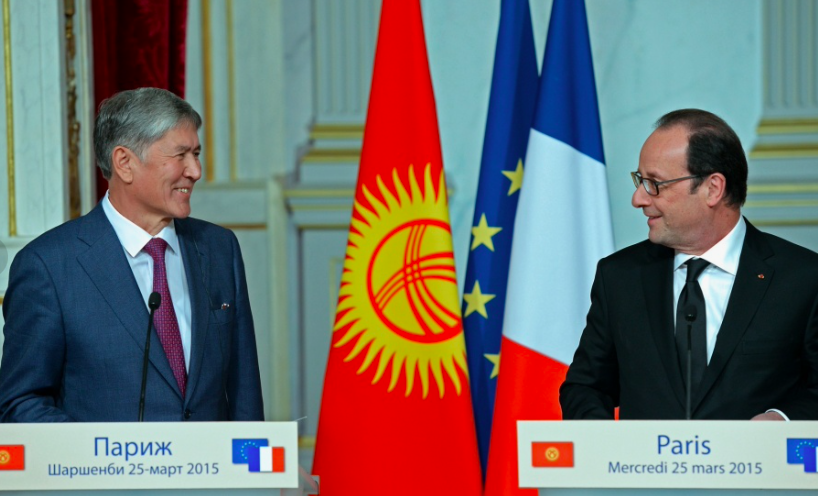
Atambaev with François Hollande

A landmark event during the work of Almazbek Atambayev is also the introduction of biometric passports and a biometric electoral system that ensured the transparency of elections and excluded the possibility for one citizen to vote several times. It became possible to vote only after identifying your fingerprint. During Atambayev's presidency, the country introduced a system of participation in elections based on biometric data, which dramatically increased the transparency of the voting procedure and eliminated many opportunities for falsification. The 2014 law "On Biometric Registration of Citizens of the Kyrgyz Republic" played an important role in the development of the institution of democratic elections. The European Union assisted Kyrgyzstan in organizing the parliamentary (2015) elections, which were found to be fair and competitive. Atambayev negotiated this assistance during his visit to Brussels during negotiations with the President of the European Parliament Martin Schulz and the President of the European Council Herman Van Rompuy in 2013. Also at that time, Atambayev had an active dialogue with the President of the European Commission, Jose Manuel Barroso.

In many cases, the Prosecutor General's Office of Kyrgyzstan has often acted on Atambayev's behalf to represents his interests. They were often dictated by the fact that the leadership of Kazakhstan interfered in the electoral process in Kyrgyzstan, especially after president of Kazakhstan met with one of the opposition leaders a month before the elections.

Federica Mogherini, during a visit to Kyrgyzstan in 2017, recognized “the indisputable merits of Almazbek Atambayev in the comprehensive improvement of the electoral process in the republic, as well as the development of democratic institutions”.

=== Foreign policy with European Union ===
In 2011 soon after becoming president, Atambayev travelled to Turkey and signed an agreement with the Turkish President Abdullah Gül agreeing to increase trade from $300 million in 2011 to $1 billion by 2015, with Turkey also agreeing to attract Turkish investment to Kyrgyzstan to the amount of $450 million within the next few years. Atambayev visited Brussels as president 4 times - in 2011, 2013, 2015 and 2016. From March 22 to April 1, 2015, Atambayev's tour of European countries (Switzerland, Austria, France, Belgium, Germany) took place, during which numerous agreements were reached on deepening and developing relations in various fields - from cultural exchange to investment cooperation . The EU has provided ongoing support to Kyrgyzstan in democratic reforms: within the framework of the agreements reached by Atambayev, within the framework of bilateral cooperation for the period 2014–2020. The EU has allocated EUR 184 million to the Kyrgyz Republic for the development of three key sectors - education, the rule of law and rural development.

Angela Merkel's visit to Kyrgyzstan in 2015 was the first visit of the Federal Chancellor to this country in the history of the independent Kyrgyz Republic and the first visit of Federal Chancellor of Germany to Central Asian region in history.

Kyrgyzstan also received GSP+ status with European Union under Almazbek Atambayev in 2015. To retain GSP+ status, Kyrgyzstan must comply with 27 international conventions. 7 of them relate to human rights - protecting the rights of children, eliminating discrimination against women and minorities, protecting freedom of speech, freedom of assembly, the right to a fair trial, ensuring the independence of the judiciary, as well as economic, cultural and social rights.

In 2013, he launched a tirade against the United Kingdom, accusing it undermined democracy by allowing Bakiyev's son, Maxim to live in London:

"Is Britain hosting the kids of [Muammar] Gaddafi or Bashar al-Assad? Why are there double standards against Kyrgyzstan? Britain is saying: 'We want to help with democratic development in Kyrgyzstan.' That's a lie. You're hosting a guy who robbed us. We could use that money to fund fair elections".

=== Foreign policy with CIS countries ===
In February 2015, tension with Belarus arose over the death of Almanbet Anapiyaev, aged 41, whose death Atambayev blamed solely on former Security Service chief Janish Bakiyev, who was being sheltered in Minsk alongside his father. The Belarusian Foreign Ministry responded by saying that it "makes no sense" to comment on his statement.

In May 2015, during a Victory Day meeting of CSTO leaders in Moscow, Atambayev took part in an argument with President Islam Karimov over the issue of water resources of Central Asia. Later that year, he met with supreme leader Ayatollah Ali Khamenei in Iran underlining that "Iran and Kyrgyzstan are two brotherly nations with a common religion, history and culture and there is a spirit of pursuing freedom and independence among both nations."

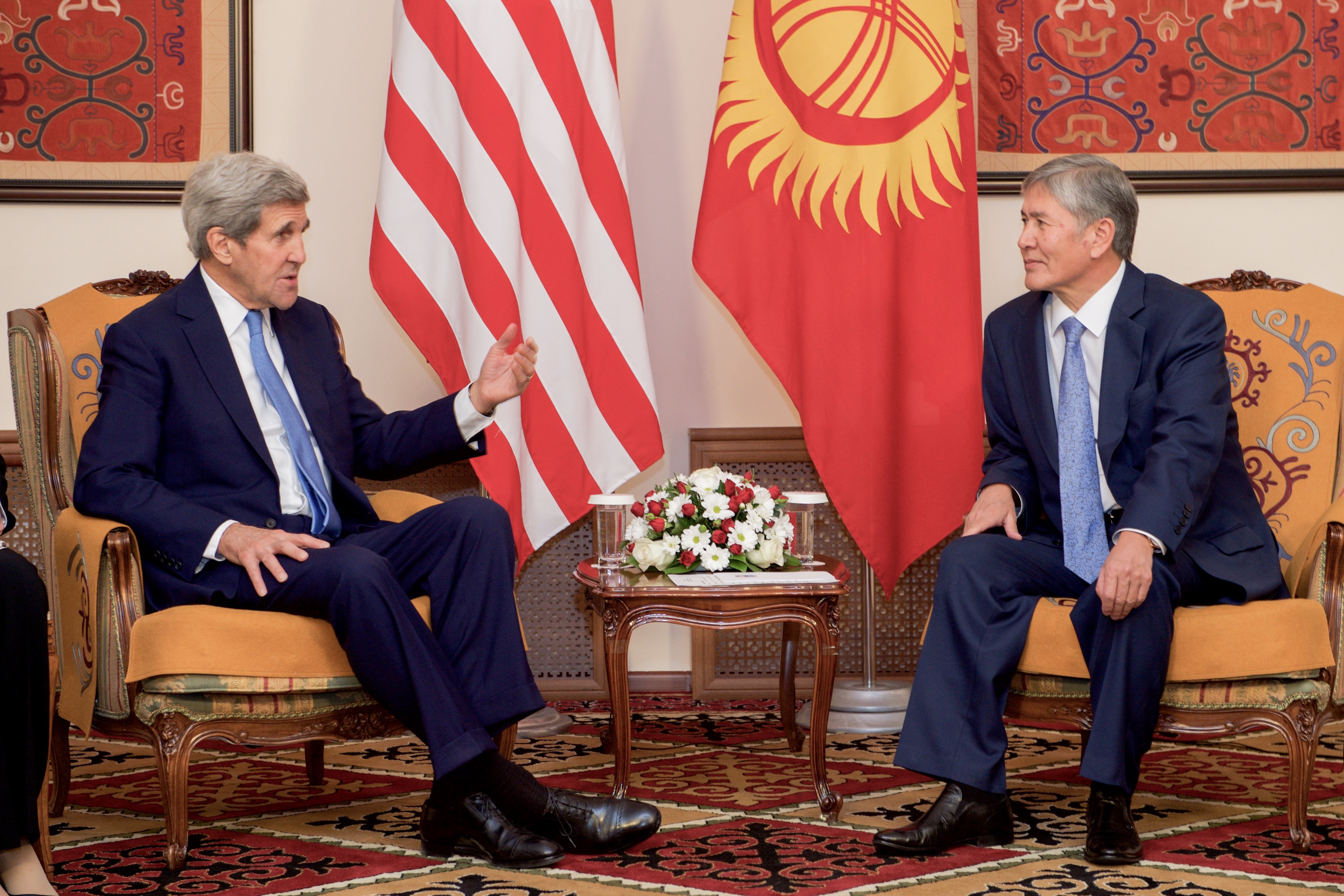
Atambayev with U.S. Secretary of State John Kerry in 2015

During the 2017 Kyrgyz presidential election, Atambayev accused Kazakhstan of sponsoring Ömürbek Babanov, who was one of the presidential candidates. He also accused Kazakhstan officials for being corrupt by looting the pensioners income. On 9 October 2017, Atambayev announced that he wouldn't attend the CIS heads of state summit in Sochi, which would have required the Kyrgyz leader to meet Kazakh president Nursultan Nazarbayev. That same month, he visited the Uzbek capital of Tashkent in a breakthrough visit for a Kyrgyz leader.

Atambaev announced Kyrgyzstan's entry into the Customs Union, secured the withdrawal of the American military base from the country in 2014, and has spoken of the need for closer economic relations with the Russian Federation, which employs at least 500,000 citizens of Kyrgyzstan; however, he also expressed his wish to achieve greater economic and energy independence from it.

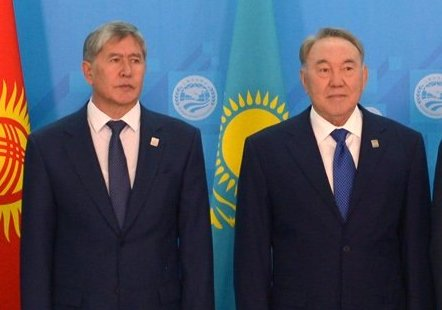
Atambayev with Nursultan Nazarbayev in the 2015 SCO Summit in Ufa

Atambayev firmly stated that the Russian military base would also be withdrawn from the country. Atambayev said:

“In the future, Kyrgyzstan should rely and hope only on its armed forces, and not on the military bases of Russia, America or another country. We must build our own army.”

In early 2012 Atambayev travelled to Moscow, where in his meeting with Medvedev he called for the $15 million owed by Russia to Kyrgyzstan for their use of the Kant airbase.

=== Memory of the Central Asian revolt of 1916 ===
Almazbek Atambayev is the only Central Asian president in the history of the region who honored the memory of the victims of the 1916 massacre carried out by soldiers of the Russian Empire. This event, known as the Urkun or Central Asian Revolt of 1916, was a tragic page in the history of the region. The opening of the monument became a symbol of respect and memory of those terrible events. Atambayev's actions underscored the importance of historical memory and unity in the face of past injustices, and the decision was seen as a significant step towards national reconciliation and strengthening the identity of the peoples of Central Asia. On September 17, 2016, the Presidents of Kyrgyzstan - Almazbek Atambayev, Russia - Vladimir Putin, Armenia - Serzh Sargsyan and Prime Minister of Moldova Pavel Filip honored the memory of the victims by laying flowers at the Memorial to those killed in 1916 in the Ata-Beyit memorial complex.

In October 2017, Atambayev signed a law establishing, in memory of the uprising and exodus of the Kyrgyz people, the “Day of History and Remembrance of Ancestors,” celebrated on November 7–8.

In 2015, Atambayev abandoned the use of the Ribbon of Saint George, which was used in post-Soviet countries and Russia, as a symbol of memory of the 1916 uprising. This sparked protests among the Russian-speaking population in Kyrgyzstan.

=== Launch of the World Nomad Games ===
Atambayev supported the launch of World Nomad Games in 2014 it in order to preserve and popularize the nomadic traditions of Central Asia. The World Nomad Games have become a platform for demonstrating the cultural heritage, sports skills and traditional sports of nomadic nations, promoting the strengthening of cultural ties and mutual understanding between the peoples of different countries. The project was supported by UNESCO.

The first three World Nomad Games were held in Cholpon-Ata, Kyrgyzstan. The fourth games were held in Iznik, Turkey between September 29 and October 2, 2022. The WNG of 2024 will be held in Astana, Kazakhstan (September 8–13).

Atambayev personally led the Kyrgyz national team on the opening ceremony of the first World Nomad Games in 2014 and 2016 in order to popularize the event.

== Post-Presidency (2017–present) ==
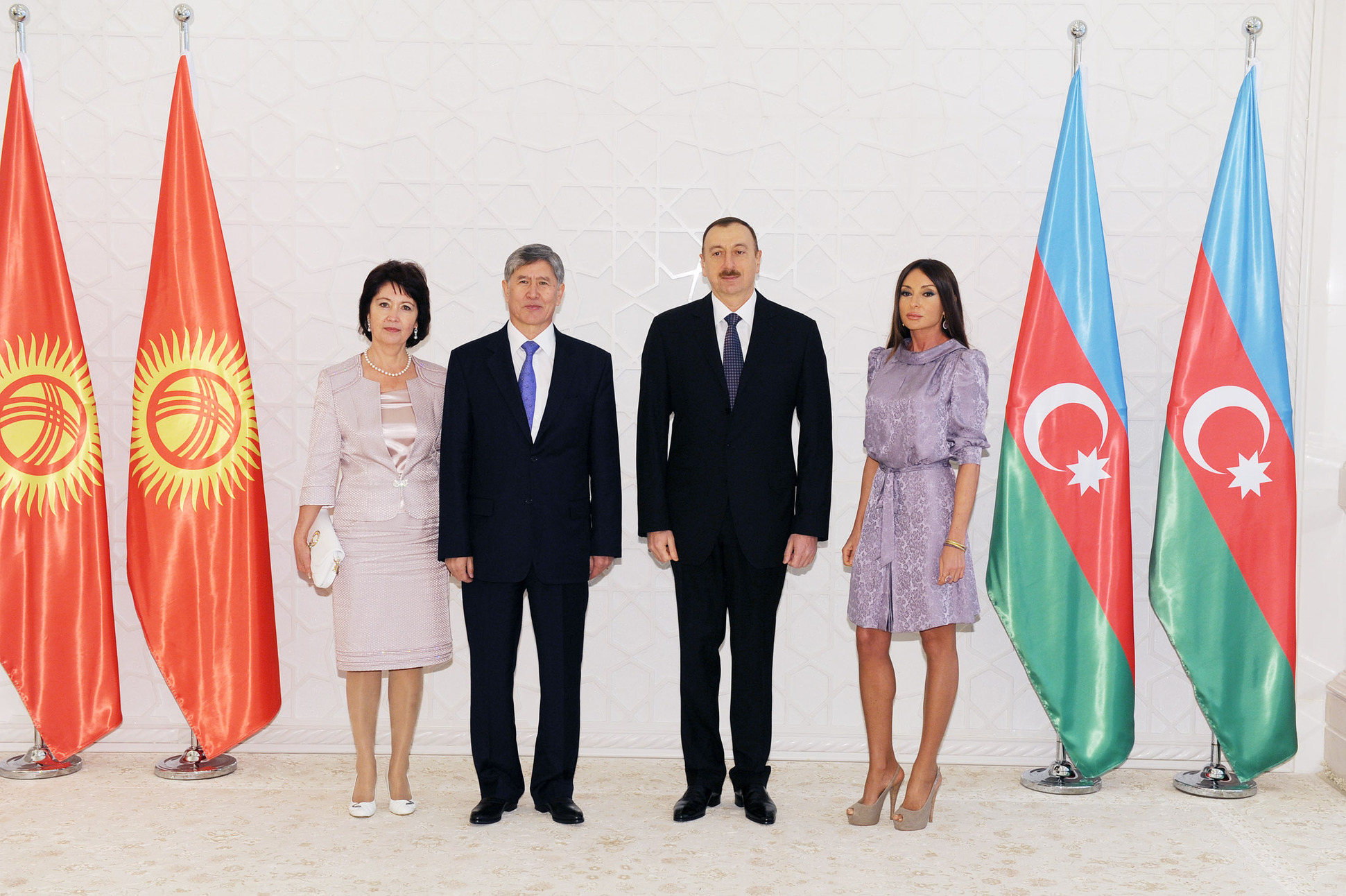
Raisa Atambayeva, Almazbek Atambayev, Ilham Aliyev and Mehriban Aliyeva in 2012

Since he left office on 24 November 2017 and handed the presidency to his successor and former prime minister Sooronbay Jeenbekov, he has served as head of the SDPK. In his post presidency he got back to the political arena, most notably by criticizing his own successor. This criticism, which began in the spring of 2018, has mostly revolved around Jeenbekov's establishment of family clan regime. By that time, the media began to dazzle with headlines about the family-clan regime of Jeenbekov and dozens of his relatives in the highest state apparatus, embassies and parliament. On 17 March, he expressed regret by saying: "I apologize to everyone for bringing this person to power".

In June 2019, MPs voted to strip Atambayev of his presidential immunity and called for the pursuit of criminal charges on him.

Before that, in February, Head of Constitutional Chamber Erkinbek Mamyrov publicly made a statement that “there is no retroactivity of law” and Almazbek Atambaev can not be deprived of presidential immunity in accordance with the Law of the Kyrgyz Republic of May 15, 2019 on amendments to the Law of the Kyrgyz Republic “On Guarantees for the Activities of the President of the Kyrgyz Republic”. For these statements, the chairman of the Constitutional Chamber Mamyrov was replaced by an assistant to the president's brother - Asylbek Jeenbekov - in parliament.

In response, Atambayev told reporters at his residence in Koy-Tash that he would wait for decision of Constitutional Chamber and protect his constitutional rights: "The Constitutional Court must put an end to the question of the legality or illegality of interrogation". He announced "stand to the end" against the family clan regime of Jeenbekov. Since then, he remained in his residence while publicly stating that he will wait for the decision of Constitutional Chamber and ready to "fight back" if police comes breaking the law and not abiding the decision of Constitutional Court. At that time he was still guarded by state security officers, since his complaint to Constitutional Court was under consideration.

On 3 July, Atambaev left his residence for the first time in weeks to speak at a rally of 1,000 of his supporters who called for all the charges to be dropped. On 24 July, he began a two-day visit to Russia with a delegation from the SDPK after departing on a Sukhoi Superjet 100 at Kant Air Base (operated by the Russian Air Force) at 1:48 pm that day. During the visit, he met with President Vladimir Putin in the Kremlin.

== Assassination attempts ==
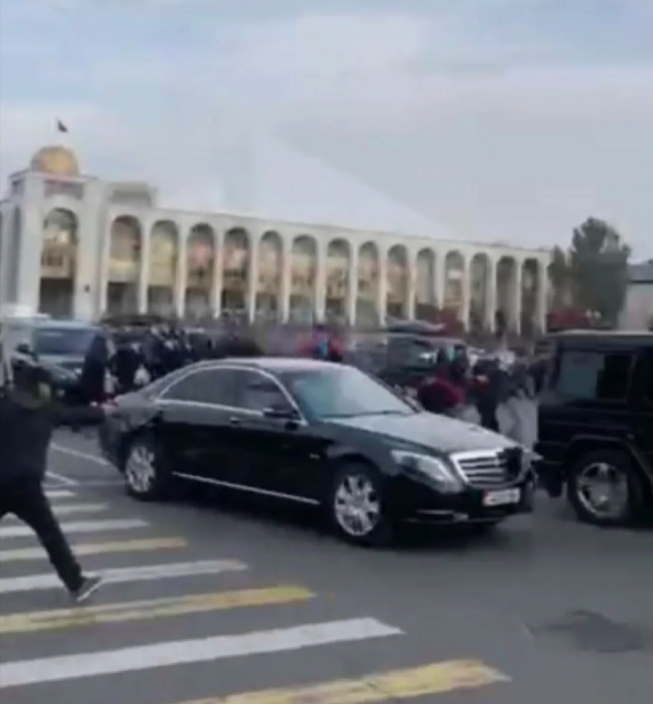
Assassination attempt on Atambaev in 2020

During the period of work (March 2007 – November 2007) as the Prime Minister, an assassination attempt on 11 May 2007 through poisoning was made on Atambaev. As Turkish doctors from the military medical hospital in Ankara later confirmed, the poisoning was caused by a poison of unknown origin. Almazbek Atambayev suggested: "I probably have many enemies now. There are many offended, apparently. Because of my attempts to nationalize the Kristall semiconductor materials plant, they threaten me with physical violence." Assumptions were made that people from the presidential administration could be involved in the poisoning of Atambayev - the president's son and big businessman Maxim Bakiyev and the president's brother Janish Bakiyev, who served as deputy chairman of the State Committee.

In the presidential elections in July 2009, where Atambaev was an only candidate from united opposition bloc, he was again poisoned on the eve of a meeting with voters in the Bazarkorgon district of the Jalalabad region. After breakfast at a local hotel, the single opposition candidate left for a scheduled meeting with voters, but felt unwell on the way. According to the explanations of the oppositionist, he could not imagine what the illness would lead to, and therefore did not cancel the meeting. But when getting out of the car, Almazbek Atambayev felt a loss of coordination of movements. "He felt terrible, his nails turned brown, he was vomiting and dizzy," - Atambayev's spokesman, Zhomart Saparbayev, said. Atambaev was again undergoing treatment in Turkey.

Kursan Asanov, vice-minister of Internal Affairs and head of Atambaev's arrest operation, told that during the storm of his residence in August 2019, when more than a thousand of representatives of law enforcement agencies stormed his house in Koy-Tash village, there was an order "not to take ex-president Atambaev alive".

During the events of October 2020, during the rally of the united opposition, which was led by Almazbek Atambayev and Omurbek Babanov, Atambayev's car was fired upon. The video of assassination attempt went viral in social networks.

== In opposition (2017–present) ==
=== 2019 Kyrgyz protests ===
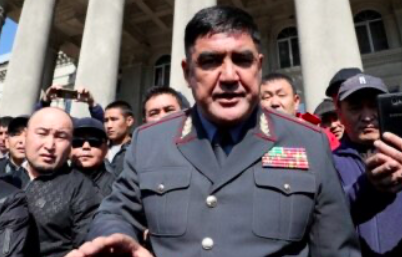
Kursan Asanov, former Minister of Internal Affairs and head of the special operation, stated that he received instructions from the president "Do NOT take Atambayev alive"

Kursan Asanov, vice-minister of Internal Affairs and head of Atambaev's arrest operation, told that during the storm of his residence in August 2019, when more than a thousand of representatives of law enforcement agencies stormed his house in Koy-Tash village, there was an order "not to take ex-president Atambaev alive". The population of the country, and especially population of Chui valley, understanding the absurdity of the accusations against ex-president Atambayev and sensibly assessing the attacks of the authorities on the SDPK, as pressure on the opposition, sided with ex-president Atambaev. On 7 August 2019, the Special Forces of Kyrgyzstan attacked Atambayev's residence in Bishkek. As a result of the attack, one soldier died and hundreds of civilians and military personnel were injured. In a meeting of the Security Council, Jeenbekov accused Atambayev of "rudely violating the constitution". A second raid was launched the next day, after which Atambayev surrendered to security forces. On August 9, 2019, special forces illegally arrested the office of the Social Democratic Party of Kyrgyzstan and April TV channel, which voiced the opposition agenda to the population. All documents of the party, all organizational equipment and other property belonging to the Social Democratic Party of Kyrgyzstan were illegally confiscated. Having received information about SDPK members throughout the country on the computers and servers of the SDPK, the special services began to call all SDPK members throughout the country for interrogations and exerted strong pressure. Subsequently, 1,700 people sent an appeal to the General Prosecutor's Office of the Kyrgyz Republic with a request to initiate a criminal case against President Sooronbai Jeenbekov for his illegal actions. In response to this, on the contrary, all these 1,700 people began to be called in for interrogations and they were exerted to strong pressure, by uttering warnings and threats.

On 13 August, Orozbek Opumbayev, the head of the State Committee for National Security (SCNS), said Atambayev was plotting to topple the government before he was taken into custody. On 23 June 2020, he was sentenced to 11 years in jail for corruption on the Batukaev case.

On the November 25–27, 2022 on Congress of Socialist International in Madrid, the declaration on Kyrgyzstan has been accepted by 93 political parties that stated: “Non-investigation by the procurator and the court of the facts of inflicting severe injuries and the use of brute force using weapons, including cold weapons, against 1,700 civilians in Koi-Tash on August 7–8, suggests an unfair trial, the purpose of which is to cover up the crimes of the previous heads of special services - Opumbaev and Zhunushaliev. The Socialist International notes that these actions of the armed forces against the civilian population fall under the articles of “war crime”, as well as “crime against humanity”, which is an internationally investigated case. If the statements of the affected citizens continue to be ignored, the organization will be forced to assist in the international investigation.” His son Kadyrbek Atambaev told about torture on the Congress of Socialist International.

=== The Batukaev case ===
Almazbek Atambaev was sentenced to a criminal term in case of Batukaev's release and alleged involvement in the jailbreak of the gangster Batukaev, although there was no evidence in the case that Batukaev and Atambaev were somehow personally connected and supported contacts. All court proceedings on Atambaev were conducted not in the official court chamber, but in the prison of State Committee for National Security of Kyrgyz Republic, where no journalists or even relatives were allowed since the case was classified. In November 2020, the Judicial Collegium of the Supreme Court of the Kyrgyz Republic overturned the guilty verdict against A. Atambaev on the escape of Batukaev, since this verdict was passed with a large number of gross procedural violations (up to the point that the defendant was deprived of the right to the last word and to participate in court debate).

=== 2020 protests ===
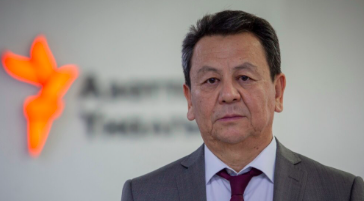
Former head of special services Suvanaliev called Atambayev's arrest the result of political agreements between the previous authorities of Kyrgyzstan

On 5 October 2020, protests erupted with a crowd of 1,000 people, that grew to at least 5,000 people by evening in Bishkek, the nation's capital, in protest against results and allegations of vote-buying in the October 2020 parliamentary election. In addition, protestors freed Atambayev from prison. On 8 October, Atambayev survived an assassination attempt in Bishkek after the car he was traveling in was shot at. After a failed assassination attempt on him, however, he was imprisoned again on 10 October. He was imprisoned again on 10 October for participation in the 2020 Kyrgyz revolution turmoil, but later was acquitted of criminal charges.

According to Suvanaliev, the former chairman of the State Committee for National Security, Atambayev's arrest was dictated by the need to eliminate a political opponent, moreover, the previous authorities demanded imprisonment for the victims of the Koi-Tash events as a condition for the transfer of power. In addition, the authorities dictated large-scale detentions of opposition members on October 10, 2020.

=== In prison ===
In August 2019, Atambayev was imprisoned, facing charges of corruption and manslaughter, but was later acquitted on them. On 5 October 2020, election protestors freed him from prison. Atambayev was acquitted in all criminal cases against him in February 2023. On March 23, 2022, Atambaev's spine was damaged as a result of violence by the prison guards, and numerous abrasions and marks of beatings were found on his body, which was confirmed on March 25 by the state National Center for the Prevention of Torture of the Kyrgyz Republic and subsequently by a medical examination at the National Center for Cardiology.

Atambayev was denied not only treatment, but even a serious medical examination. Only after the Secretary General of the Socialist International Luis Ayala made a special visit to Kyrgyzstan in 2022 and a special statement from the Socialist International was issued, Atambaev was briefly placed in a clinic for examination.

In 2023, Atambayev was released on medical grounds and went into exile in Spain. In 2025, he was sentenced by a court in Kyrgyzstan in absentia to 11 years imprisonment for illicit enrichment, illegally acquiring land, and involvement in the 2019 Kyrgyz protests.

=== International support ===
On July 8 of 2022, Council of Socialist International (63 political parties around the world) made a statement, that “the manner in which the former president has been detained, tried and sentenced contravenes his legal and human rights as a defendant, violates the Kyrgyz Code of Criminal Procedure and breaches international judicial norms”. Despite the need for two operations on the esophagus, the need for which was concluded by the state National Center for Cardiology, where Atambayev was examined, to this day these operations have not been carried out. Atambayev was diagnosed with Barrett's esophagus. Later he was released with support of Socialist International President and prime-minister of Spain Pedro Sánchez and transported to Spain for medical operations. Atambayev was acquitted in all criminal cases against him.

German Chancellor Angela Merkel congratulated Atambayev on the New Year 2020, while he was still in prison.

== Electoral history ==
Electoral history of Almazbek Atambayev
Year	Office	Party	Votes received				Result
Year	Office	Party	Total	%	P.	Swing	Result
2000	President of Kyrgyzstan	SDPK	117,658	6.15%	3rd	—N/a	Lost
2009	President of Kyrgyzstan	SDPK	195,291	8.50%	2nd	+2.35	Lost
2011	President of Kyrgyzstan	SDPK	1,161,929	63.83%	1st	+55.33	Won

== Awards ==
=== Kyrgyzstan ===
Hero of the Kyrgyz Republic - ribbon for ordinary uniform

Hero of the Kyrgyz Republic
— 27 November 2017

Order "Danaker" - ribbon for ordinary uniform

Order "Danaker"
"For contribution to the social and economic development of the republic and fruitful work to preserve inter-ethnic harmony"
— 28 November 2007

Order "Manas" II Class - ribbon for ordinary uniform

Order "Manas" II Class
"For civic responsibility and courage during the years of struggle against the authoritarian family-clan regime, consistent defense of the ideas of democracy, freedom of expression and peaceful assembly, active participation in the constitutional reform, the formation of the democratic parliament and also in connection with the successful completion of the transition period after the April 2010 People's Revolution"
— 1 December 2011

Dank Medal - ribbon for ordinary uniform

Dank Medal
"For the fruitful activity in the industrial production sector in Kyrgyzstan"
— 1999

=== Foreign honors ===
- Presidential Order of Excellence (Georgia, 2013)
- Order of Dostyk I degree (Kazakhstan, 7 November 2014)
- Order of Alexander Nevsky (Russia, 17 September 2016)
- Order "Friend of Azerbaijan" (Azerbaijan, 2016)
- Hero of the Kyrgyz Republic (2017)

Fascia dell'Ordine della Repubblica di Serbia (Serbia) - ribbon for ordinary uniform

Fascia dell'Ordine della Repubblica di Serbia (Serbia)
"Per i meriti nello sviluppo e nel rafforzamento della cooperazione pacifica e delle relazioni amichevoli tra la Serbia e il Kirghizistan."
— 2013

Ordine dell'amicizia di I Classe (Kazakistan) - ribbon for ordinary uniform

Ordine dell'amicizia di I Classe (Kazakistan)
"Per il contributo allo sviluppo dell'amicizia tra il Kazakistan e il Kirghizistan"
— 7 novembre 2014

Ordine di Aleksandr Nevskij (Russia) - ribbon for ordinary uniform

Ordine di Aleksandr Nevskij (Russia)
"Per lo straordinario contributo al rafforzamento della cooperazione multiforme tra la Federazione russa e il Kirghizistan in uno spirito di fiducia reciproca e di partnership strategica"
— 17 settembre 2016

== Notes ==
Political offices
Preceded by Azim Isabekov	Prime Minister of Kyrgyzstan; 2007	Succeeded by Iskenderbek Aidaraliyev; Acting
Preceded by Daniar Usenov	Prime Minister of Kyrgyzstan; 2010–2011	Succeeded by Omurbek Babanov; Acting
Preceded by Omurbek Babanov; Acting	Prime Minister of Kyrgyzstan; 2011	Succeeded by Omurbek Babanov
Preceded by Roza Otunbayeva	President of Kyrgyzstan; 2011–2017	Succeeded by Sooronbay Jeenbekov
