= AKIpress News Agency =

Kyrgyz independent news agency founded in 2000

- Formation: 2000
- Type: News agency
- Legal status: active
- Purpose: provide news and analytical materials
- Headquarters: Bishkek, Kyrgyzstan
- Parent organization: AKI Kyrgyzstan
- Website: www.akipress.org

AKIpress News Agency (Kyrgyz: АКИpress маалымат агенттиги, romanized: AKIpress maalymat agenttigi) is the first independent news agency in the Kyrgyz Republic. It is based in Bishkek, the capital city of the Kyrgyz Republic. The agency is commercially-focussed: AKIpress earns money from paid access to archives and from the sale of advertising-space on its websites. The online news website is in Russian, Kyrgyz, and English. The agency's websites publish between 500 and 700 news stories daily about the latest developments in Kyrgyzstan, including political, economic, social, scientific, cultural, diplomatic, and sports news. Working-mode is 24 hours a day.

== History ==
The domain was registered on 19 June 2000. The site of the first ever independent news agency AKIpress began functioning after a testing-period.

In 2002, the agency opened the first independent press center in the Kyrgyz Republic.

AKIpress news agency marked its 10th anniversary in 2010.

== Products ==
Over the years, the news agency has developed 25 products in total, from news and analytical products to who is who among statesmen and companies, video portal, entertainment and classifieds.

Currently, AKIpress has a number of subsidiary information sites, including the economic edition Tazabek, the regional news portal Turmush, the news site "Reporter", the criminal news site "Svodka", as well as "Sport AKIpress", "Culture", "Healthcare", etc. The agency has a full English version - AKIpress news agency (English).

In 2007, with the participation of AKIpress, the Central Asian news service CentralAsia.media was established to cover news from the countries of the Central Asian region.

AKIpress also supports the youth entertainment website Limon.kg and video service BulBul.kg.

== Audience ==
In the autumn of 2016, the number of unique users exceeded 2 million per month for the first time, according to Google Analytics data. The following year, AKIpress saw significant growth in its audience again. According to Google Analytics, over 27 million unique users visited AKIpress websites in 2020 and the total number of page views exceeded 436 million. Over 38 million unique users visited AKIpress websites in 2022 and the total number of page views exceeded 237 million. At the same time, the daily audience on weekdays is at least 300,000 people.

== Social networks ==
AKIpress news may be followed in popular social networking sites like Facebook, Twitter, Instagram.

AKIpress has the largest audience in social networks in YouTube (youtube.com/akipressnews) - more than 1 380 000 followers.

AKIpress account on Instagram (instagram.com/akipress) has more than 1 million followers.

As of January 20, 2025, the number of Facebook followers of AKIpress reached 167,000.

AKIpress channel in Telegram (t.me/akipress) has around 40,000 followers.

AKIpress channel on TikTok is followed by 135,000.

AKIpress account on Twitter has more than 11,000 followers.

== Management ==
Alina Saginbayeva is the Director General of AKIpress News Agency.
