= Koy-Tash =

Koy-Tash Кой-Таш
- Location within Kyrgyzstan
- Coordinates: 42°43′02″N 74°39′54″E
- Country: Kyrgyzstan
- Region: Chüy Region
- District: Alamüdün District
- Elevation: 1,264 m (4,147 ft)

Population (2021)
  - Total: 2,736
- Time zone: UTC+6

Koy-Tash is a village in the Alamüdün District of Chüy Region of Kyrgyzstan. Its population was 2,736 in 2021. The Koy-Tash events happened here.
