= Aaly Karashev =

Kyrgyz politician

- Аалы Карашев
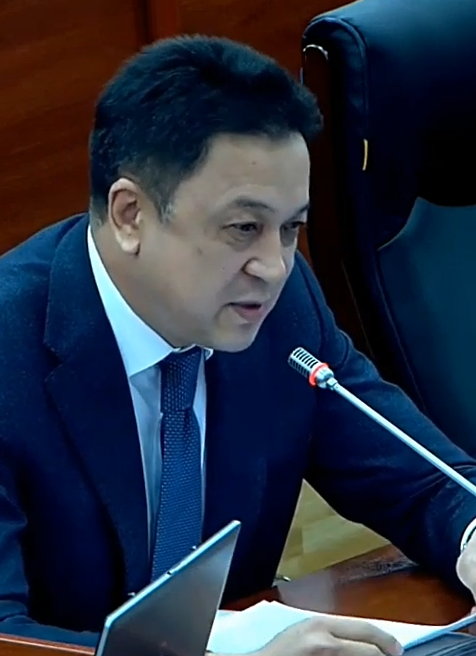
- Karashev in 2019

Prime Minister of Kyrgyzstan Acting
- In office 1 September 2012 – 6 September 2012
- President: Almazbek Atambayev
- Preceded by: Omurbek Babanov
- Succeeded by: Zhantoro Satybaldiyev

Personal details
- Born: 30 October 1968 (age 57) Osh, Soviet Union (now Kyrgyzstan)
- Party: Respublika Party

Aaly Karashev (Kyrgyz: Аалы Азимович Карашев; born 30 October 1968) is a Kyrgyz politician who served as acting Prime Minister from 1 September to 5 September 2012.

Political offices
Preceded by Omurbek Babanov	Prime Minister of Kyrgyzstan; Acting; 2012	Succeeded by Zhantoro Satybaldiyev
