= Kumtor Gold Mine =

Gold mine in Issyk-Kul, Kyrgyzstan

- Location within Kyrgyzstan
- Location: Issyk-Kul Region, Kyrgyzstan; 41°52′N 78°12′E
- Products: Gold
- Financial year: 2021
- Type: open-pit
- Discovered: 1978
- Opened: 1997
- Company: Kyrgyz Republic
- Website: www.kumtor.kg

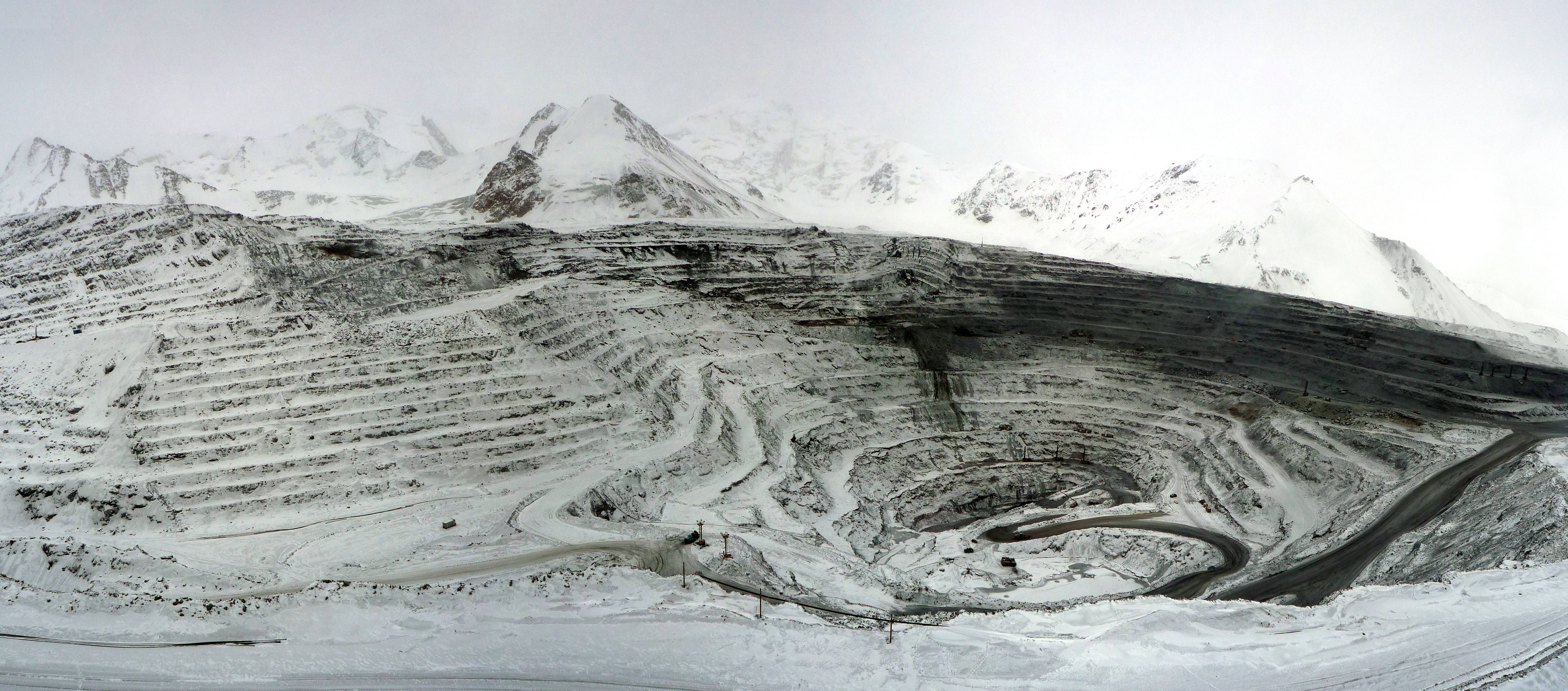
Black-and-white photo of Kumtor Gold Mine

The Kumtor mine (Kyrgyz: Кумтөр, romanized: Kumtör) is one of the largest gold mines in Central Asia. The mine has been producing gold since 1997 and has produced over 13.8 million ounces of gold as of June 30, 2022. At 13,000 feet, the mine is the second-highest in the world, behind only Yanacocha in Peru.

== History ==
In 1978, a geophysical expedition of the State Geological Committee of the Kirghiz Soviet Socialist Republic discovered the deposit. In 1992, the newly formed Government of Kyrgyzstan and the Cameco Corporation signed an agreement forming the Kumtor Gold Project. That same year, the Cameco Corporation became the full owner of Kumtor. The mine's construction commenced in 1993, and commercial gold production at Kumtor started in May 1997.

By October 2013, the Kyrgyz government had completed negotiations with the company and submitted to Parliament a draft memorandum creating a 50/50 joint venture company, which was however, rejected by Parliament as it demanded that Kyrgyzstan's equity interests in the company should be increased to 67 percent. In 2014, the restructuring program for Kumtor was approved by Parliament. In December 2015, however, it was announced that the Kyrgyz Republic's Government was pulling out of the talks as it was going to provide a new restructuring program.

Then legal proceedings were transferred to international courts and continued until the Strategic Environment and Investment Agreement was signed between Centerra Gold and the government. The said agreement settled all disputes and the existing arbitration and environmental claims. On 16 November 2016, were also adopted amendments to the Water Code permitting commercial activities near the Davydov and Lysyi glaciers.

=== Ownership controversy and nationalization movement ===
Since 2012, advocates have called for the nationalization of the mine due to accusation against Centerra Gold of environmental violations and corruption. On 14 May 2021, President Sadyr Japarov signed into a bill allowing for temporary government control over the mine, eight days after it was approved by parliament. In response, Centerra Gold launched arbitration against Kyrgyzstan over the mine. One source described the May action as an expropriation.

Temporary external management was introduced at Kumtor Gold Company CJSC by the Order of the Cabinet of Ministers of the Kyrgyz Republic dated May 17, 2021. On the same day, Tengiz Bolturuk, an experienced manager with a Canadian Professional Engineer (P.Eng.) license and extensive experience in the mining industry around the world, was appointed as the Temporary External Manager of Kumtor Gold Company CJSC.

== Operation and contribution to the Kyrgyz economy ==
The deposit is mined by open-pit mining techniques utilizing typical drill, blast and truck/loader or truck/shovel operations. The ore is delivered to the crusher and further to the mill, where the gold is extracted using carbon-in-leach technology. The mill's rated throughput is approximately 16,000 tonnes of ore per day. The mine is the largest private sector employer and taxpayer in Kyrgyzstan. In 2020 KGC operations accounted for 12.5% of GDP and 23.3% of aggregate industrial output.
