= Human rights in Kyrgyzstan =

Human rights in Kyrgyzstan rank poorly, and continue to decline due to political centralization and restrictions on fundamental freedoms. Beginning in 2021, Freedom House has classified Kyrgyzstan as "not free". The United States Department of State reports concerns including torture; arbitrary arrest or detention; restrictions on freedom of expression and media, including censorship and violence against journalists; antisemitism; human trafficking, forced labor and child labor; and systematic restrictions, threats and violence against union activities. Government actions against media, journalists and activists escalated from May to October 2025. As of August 2025, a media law requires mandatory government registration for all media outlets, including online media.

As of 2025, Kyrgyzstan ranked 104th of 143 countries on the World Justice Project's Rule of Law Index. Also in 2025, its ranking on Reporters Without Borders (RSF)'s World Press Freedom Index dropped 24 places, to 144th of 180 countries. Key issues include arbitrary arrests of journalists and activists, weakening of legal protections against torture, and the government's use of restrictive legislation to limit the activity of independent NGOs and restrict free expression in media and civil activities. Constitutional changes have been used to significantly expand presidential authority, weaken parliamentary oversight and allow unchecked corruption.

Corruption is an issue in the country, which ranks 146th of 180 countries on the 2024 Corruption Perceptions Index (CPI). Despite some reports of improvements, women in Kyrgyzstan experience high rates of domestic violence, bride kidnapping, human trafficking, child marriage, economic inequality, and under-representation in political life. LGBTQ rights in Kyrgyzstan have been declining in recent years.

== Political history ==
Formerly a republic of the Soviet Union, Kyrgyzstan became independent in 1991. Initially Kyrgyzstan was hailed as the most democratic country in Central Asia, with greater press freedoms and an active civil society. The country was quick to join international organizations and to ratify global human rights conventions.

Remaining reasonably stable throughout most of the 1990s, democracy in Kyrgyzstan showed initial promise under the leadership of Askar Akayev, but moved towards autocracy and authoritarianism by the early 2000s. In 2004, Kyrgyzstan was rated by Freedom House as "Not Free," with a 6 in Political Rights and 5 in Civil Liberties (scale of 1–7; 1 is the highest). This indicated marked regression, from a 4.3 rating a decade earlier in 1994. Following the Tulip Revolution of March 2005, Akayev resigned.

President Kurmanbek Bakiyev was elected in July 2005, but fled in 2010 after the Second Kyrgyz Revolution. Roza Otunbayeva then took over as an interim President. A new constitution was adopted in 2010 restricting the presidency to a single six-year term limit, and creating a semi-parliamentary system with shared executive power.

In December 2011 President Almazbek Atambayev took power. In November 2017, Sooronbay Jeenbekov became president. In 2020, following a contested Parliamentary election and the Third Kyrgyz Revolution, Jeenbekov resigned. He was succeeded by president Sadyr Japarov as of 28 January 2021. Two public referendums in 2021 (10 January 2021 and 11 April 2021) resulted in constitutional reforms that reduced the size of the Kyrgyz Supreme Council and transferred significant powers from the legislature to the president.

The following chart shows Kyrgyzstan's ratings under various leadership since 1991, as given by the Freedom in the World reports, published annually by Freedom House. A rating of 1 is "free"; 7, "not free".^{1}

Historical ratings

Year	Political Rights	Civil Liberties	Status	President^{2}
1991	5	4	Partly Free	Askar Akayev
1992	4	2	Partly Free	Askar Akayev
1993	5	3	Partly Free	Askar Akayev
1994	4	3	Partly Free	Askar Akayev
1995	4	4	Partly Free	Askar Akayev
1996	4	4	Partly Free	Askar Akayev
1997	4	4	Partly Free	Askar Akayev
1998	5	5	Partly Free	Askar Akayev
1999	5	5	Partly Free	Askar Akayev
2000	6	5	Not Free	Askar Akayev
2001	6	5	Not Free	Askar Akayev
2002	6	5	Not Free	Askar Akayev
2003	6	5	Not Free	Askar Akayev
2004	6	5	Not Free	Askar Akayev
2005	5	4	Partly Free	Askar Akayev
2006	5	4	Partly Free	Kurmanbek Bakiyev
2007	5	4	Partly Free	Kurmanbek Bakiyev
2008	5	4	Partly Free	Kurmanbek Bakiyev
2009	6	5	Not Free	Kurmanbek Bakiyev
2010	5	5	Partly Free	Kurmanbek Bakiyev
2011	5	5	Partly Free	Roza Otunbayeva
2012	5	5	Partly Free	Almazbek Atambayev
2013	5	5	Partly Free	Almazbek Atambayev
2014	5	5	Partly Free	Almazbek Atambayev
2015	5	5	Partly Free	Almazbek Atambayev
2016	5	5	Partly Free	Almazbek Atambayev
2017	5	5	Partly Free	Almazbek Atambayev
2018	5	4	Partly Free	Sooronbay Jeenbekov
2019	5	4	Partly Free	Sooronbay Jeenbekov
2020	7	5	Not Free	Sooronbay Jeenbekov
2021	7	5	Not Free	Talant Mamytov (acting)
2022	7	5	Not Free	Sadyr Japarov
2023	7	5	Not Free	Sadyr Japarov

== Areas of concern ==
=== Press freedom ===
While there has been a history of critical journalism in the country, journalists, media outlets and activists increasingly risk arrest and criminal charges in retaliation for exercising the right to freedom of expression and for covering controversial topics (like corruption). The arrests of Makhabat Tazhibek Kyzy and others at the anti-corruption news portal Temirov Live are considered by international human rights organizations to be part of a broader pattern of attempts by the Kyrgyz government to silence critics.

Authorities often use article 278 of the Kyrgyzstani criminal code to judicially harass journalists with vague charges such as calling for mass disorder. Cases include Kanyshai Mamyrkulova, who was found guilty of "calling for mass riots" after criticising a border agreement between Kyrgyzstan and Tajikistan in social media posts in March 2025. Rita Karasartova was head of the Institute for Public Analysis, a non-governmental organisation to monitor the judicial system in Kyrgyzstan. She was arrested on April 14, 2025, after posting a letter from political activist Tilekmat Kurenov, and sentenced on September 18, 2025, to five years' probation and a fine of 50, 000 KGS.

From May to October 2025 there were widespread government actions against media, journalists and activists, further undermining freedoms of expression, association and peaceful assembly in Kyrgyzstan. Staff of Kloop media were arrested in May and convicted in September, for allegedly "calling for mass riots". In July 2025, a court forced the closure of April TV, for “negative” information and “sarcasm.” A new media law was signed by President Japarov in August 2025, requiring mandatory registration of all media outlets, including online media, and granting the government control over registration procedures. On September 23, 2025, President Japarov signed legislation to close the National Centre for the Prevention of Torture, an independent monitoring body, in violation of the country's international commitments to the UN Optional Protocol to the Convention against Torture (OPCAT).

Traditional storytellers, or akyns, have also faced scrutiny. In March 2025, performer Asylbek Maratov reported receiving a warning from state security after singing about political issues. Another akyn, Askat Zhetigen, was sentenced to three years in prison for allegedly calling for the violent seizure of power. Critics argue these actions reflect a shrinking space for free expression in Kyrgyzstan.

Journalism in Kyrgyzstan, especially when related to religious topics or inter-ethnic relations, often lacks neutrality in its coverage.

=== Women's rights ===
The country suffers from high and rising inequalities, women are largely excluded from decision-making. Violence against women is widespread and takes many forms, including domestic violence, bride kidnapping, trafficking, early marriages and physical abuse. The negative reinterpretation of some cultural and social practices increasingly restricts women's rights to control their lives. Rural women and girls have restricted access to productive resources.

In cooperation with the United Nations Kyrgyzstan developed a policy plan to decrease gender inequality in 2013, but women still suffer from their subordinated position in society. Kyrgyzstan strengthened the 2016 Family Violence Law a year later and criminalized domestic violence in January 2019. However, authorities are not consistently enforcing protective measures for women and girls.

In 2018, the release of the music video "Kyz" (Girl) by singer and activist Zere Asylbek sparked a nationwide debate on women’s rights and bodily autonomy in Kyrgyzstan. The video, which featured Asylbek wearing a bra and blazer, challenged traditional gender norms and social expectations (often referred to as uyat, or "shame"). Despite receiving numerous death threats and online harassment following the release, Asylbek used the platform to advocate against victim-blaming and gender-based violence. Her work became a symbol for a new wave of Kyrgyz feminism, highlighting the tension between conservative social structures and the growing movement for individual freedoms and women's protection under the law.

==== Bride kidnapping ====
As a consequence of changes in gender ideologies in Kyrgyzstan, there has been a revival and legitimation of nonconsensual bride kidnapping as a national tradition. In this practise the groom abducts a girl off the street with a group of friends and brings her to his parents. Traditionally the women of the family will try to convince the girl to marry the boy who abducted her. Often girls have little choice, because refusing to marry often leads to being outcast by their parents.

Even though in Kyrgyz law the practice is considered illegal and a violation of human rights since 2013, up to 50% of ethnic Kyrgyz marriages are a result of kidnappings, both consensual and non-consensual. In April 2021, protests broke out in Bishkek after a woman was found dead following a bride kidnapping. The country's president Sadyr Japarov called for the incident to be the last in Kyrgyzstan's history. Changes to the Criminal Code, as of December 1, 2021, increased the sentences for kidnapping a person for marriage under Article 172, to imprisonment for five to seven years.

=== LGBT rights ===
Both male and female same-sex sexual activity are legal in Kyrgyzstan, having been decriminalized in 1998. The age of consent is defined as 16. However, same-sex marriage is not recognized and was explicitly banned in the constitution as of 2016.

From 2001 to 2020, trans people in Kyrgyzstan were accorded gender recognition and could be legally recognized under the Kyrgyz law "On acts of civil status". This was amended by Parliament on June 17, 2020, to restrict legal gender recognition and limit the use of gender markers to male and female. As of August 1, 2020, when the revised law took effect, transgender individuals cannot obtain legal gender recognition in Kyrgyzstan.

On 14 August 2023, the President of Kyrgyzstan signed into law a proposal to amend the Child Protection Law to define information harmful to the health and development of children as including content that "promotes non-traditional sexual relations". Information about LGBT people and sexual identities is therefore treated similarly to violent or pornographic content.

Lesbian, gay, bisexual, and transgender (LGBT) people face stigmatization, ill-treatment, extortion, and discrimination by state and non-state actors. Domestic violence against LGBT minors is a major issue and victims have limited access to government support. LGBT people are often unable to seek protection because of violence and other abuses by law enforcement agencies. Ill-treatment against LGBT people by law enforcement authorities is a systemic phenomenon in Kyrgyzstan according to Kyrgyz Indigo, a local LGBT advocacy group.

Various nationalist groups threatened LGBT interest groups during demonstrations in 2019, several parliament members responded by expressing their aversion to same sex couples, where one member said LGBT people should be “not just cursed, but beaten.”

=== Religious freedom ===
In 2023, the country scored 2 out of 4 for religious freedom.

== Human rights legislation ==
On September 14, 2001, the Kyrgyz Ministry of Interior declared it had implemented a "passport control regime" against "pro-Islamic" activists in the southern part of Kyrgyzstan. Following the reelection of President Askar Akayev in 2003, the government reportedly "intensified" harassment of political opposition members, independent news media groups, religious groups and ethnic minorities, according to Human Rights Watch. In advance of elections in February 2005, the Akayev government reportedly increased political restrictions on Kyrgyz citizens, in order, according to some outside observers, to prevent a "democratic revolution" like the recent one in Ukraine.

Human rights under Akayev's regime in 2004 reportedly remained poor; although there were some improvements in several areas, problems remained. Citizens' right to change their government remained limited and democratic institutions remained fragile. Members of the security forces at times beat or otherwise mistreated persons, and prison conditions remained poor. Impunity remained a problem, although the Government took steps to address it during the year. There were cases of arbitrary arrest or detention. Executive branch domination of the judiciary as well as corruption limited citizens' right to due process.

In June 2005, Kyrgyz officials said that 29 Uzbek refugees who had fled to Kyrgyzstan in the wake of the Andijan massacre would be returned to Uzbekistan. The United Nations and human rights groups criticized this decision, stating the refugees faced possible torture or execution upon their return. However, on June 27, the 439 Uzbek refugees were airlifted to safety out of the country by the United Nations.

In a move to restrict the freedom of assembly amendments were made to the Law on the Right of Citizens to Hold Peaceful Assemblies 2002 in 2008 by the government and enacted by the president in 2010. Human Rights Watch criticised the amendments, claiming that they are violating the Kyrgyz constitution and international law.

In a move that alarmed human rights groups, dozens of prominent Uzbek religious and community leaders were arrested by security forces following the 2010 South Kyrgyzstan riots, including journalist and human rights activist Azimzhan Askarov. Following a trial criticised by several international human rights organizations, Askarov was given a life sentence charges including creating mass disturbances, incitement of ethnic hatred, and complicity in murder. Various human rights organizations stated that they believe the charges against him and his co-defendants to be politically motivated. Amnesty International considers Askarov a prisoner of conscience and is currently campaigning for his immediate release and an investigation into his allegations of torture by law enforcement.

On May 18, 2011, the Kadamjay Regional Court sentenced two young men, Iskandar Kambarov (18 years old) and Jonibek Nosirov (22 years old) to seven years in prison on the charge of possessing two DVDs of an extremist Islamic organization. The two men are not Islamic, but Jehovah's Witnesses. The Norwegian human rights organization Forum 18 claims that the DVDs were planted as false evidence during a police raid. Their sentenced got overturned but it is unclear how the court case has developed further.

In July 2019, human rights defender Azimzhan Askarov died in prison in Kyrgyzstan. He was 69 years old and was serving life imprisonment. Kyrgyz authorities ignored the United Nations Human Rights Committee ruling to release Askarov, as he was arbitrarily detained, tortured, and denied a fair trial. In May 2020, he made a final appeal, and Kyrgyz Supreme Court sustained his sentence.

On 11 April 2021, the Kyrgyz Republic adopted a new Constitution through a national referendum. The Constitution upheld fundamental rights such as freedom of expression (Article 32), rights of mass media, prohibition of censorship (Article 10), a right to privacy and a right to the protection of honour and dignity (Article 29).

As of August 1, 2020, changes to the Kyrgyz law "On acts of civil status" removed the ability of transgender individuals to obtain legal gender recognition in Kyrgyzstan.

Since then, the Kyrgyz government has passed several restrictive laws limiting freedom of speech and press freedoms. “On Protection from Inaccurate (False) Information” was passed by the Kyrgyzstan parliament on July 28, 2021, and signed on August 24, 2021. It allows the state to shut down or block websites that it considers false or inaccurate.

As of 14 August 2023, the Child Protection Law was amended to define information that "promotes non-traditional sexual relations" as harmful to the health and development of children, in effect criminalizing the sharing of content about LGBT people and sexual identities.

Following widespread international criticism, a proposed draft law “On the Mass Media” was withdrawn by President Japarov on March 13, 2024. Concerns were raised about its use of ambiguous terms, creating legal uncertainty and the potential to interfere with freedom of expression, media freedoms, and information access.

In March 2024, parliament passed amendments to the Law “On Non-Commercial Organizations”, which were signed by President Japarov on April 2, 2024. Sometime referred to as “The Law on Foreign Representatives,” this imposed new requirements on non-governmental organizations (NGOs) receiving foreign funding. Under this law, "political activities" of NGOs are extremely broadly defined to include things like participation in public meetings and debates. The government can suspend or liquidate NGOs that it considers to be in violation. Impacts of this law include increased surveillance and pressure on NGOs from law enforcement authorities, reduction in public-facing activities, and self-censorship of public communication to limit criticism and use of sensitive language. The UN High Commissioner for Human Rights has noted that these changes are part of broader efforts to restrict independent functioning of civil society.

On July 16, 2024, the Supreme Court upheld the liquidation of Kloop Media, an investigative news outlet known for reporting on corruption and election violations. President Sadyr Japarov defended the decision, arguing it was necessary to combat “anarchy” rather than suppress free speech. Despite the ruling, Kloop vowed to continue publishing online. On 28 August 2024, the Culture Ministry proposed fines of up to 100,000 KGS ($1,200) for individuals and 200,000 KGS ($2,400) for organizations found guilty of spreading "disinformation" online.

As of February 2025, amendments to criminal law granted police broad powers to fine people for sharing "insulting or knowingly false defamatory information." Additional amendments were signed into law in July 2025, penalising the spreading of "false" information via mass media, and online platforms, including social networks.

On December 10, 2025, the Constitutional Court of the Kyrgyz Republic ruled against proposals (suggested in October) to reintroduce the death penalty in Kyrgyzstan. They stated that according to the Constitution of Kyrgyzstan, the death penalty cannot be reintroduced, and that constitutional amendments to allow its reintroduction are impermissible.

== See also ==
- Human trafficking in Kyrgyzstan
- Internet censorship and surveillance in Kyrgyzstan
- LGBT rights in Kyrgyzstan
- Religion in Kyrgyzstan
- Agriculture in Kyrgyzstan

== Notes ==
1.Note that the "Year" signifies the "Year covered". Therefore the information for the year marked 2008 is from the report published in 2009, and so on.
2.As of January 1.
