= LGBTQ rights in Kyrgyzstan =

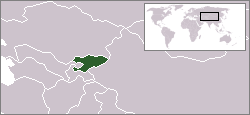
- Kyrgyzstan
- Legal status: Same-sex activity legal since 1998 Same-sex sexual activity was decriminalized in Kyrgyzstan in 1998.
- Gender identity: No
- Military: No
- Discrimination protections: None

Family rights
- Recognition of relationships: No recognition of same-sex unions
- Restrictions: Constitutional ban since 2016
- Adoption: No

Lesbian, gay, bisexual, transgender and queer (LGBTQ) people in Kyrgyzstan face significant challenges not experienced by non-LGBTQ residents. While same-sex sexual activity has been legalised in Kyrgyzstan since 1998, same-sex couples are not currently eligible for the same legal protections available to married heterosexual couples.

Reports of discrimination and violence against LGBTQ people are frequent.

== Law regarding same-sex sexual activity ==
Same-sex sexual activity was decriminalized in Kyrgyzstan in 1998. The age of consent in Kyrgyzstan is 16, regardless of gender or sexual orientation.

== Recognition of same-sex relationships ==
Kyrgyzstan does not recognize same-sex marriage or civil unions.

Since 2016, the Kyrgyz Constitution has explicitly banned same-sex marriage.

== Gender identity and expression ==
Legal gender recognition was mentioned in legislation on the Acts of Civil Status in 2001. In 2005, the law (whose formulation was adapted from similar Russian legislation) stated that a document of "established form" was required for legal gender recognition, but no such form existed. Trans people were therefore assessed on a case-by-case basis. In 2007, Kyrgyz activist organisation Labrys began efforts to develop the form, organizing training sessions for doctors and establishing a working group, with staff from the Ministry of Health supporting the process. The final draft was sent to the Office of the President. However, in 2010 the Kyrgyz Revolution occurred, which severely hampered the progress that had been made on legal gender recognition, as both the president and several ministers (several of whom had signed the draft) were ousted from their positions.

The first gender affirming surgery in Kyrgyzstan took place in Bishkek in January 2014.

In 2016, a working group was assembled in order to develop guidance on transgender health, such as instructions on how to conduct a psychiatric evaluation and prescribe gender-affirming hormone replacement therapy. The guidance and the form of the document for legal gender recognition were officially adopted in 2017, enabling trans people in Kyrgyzstan to change their legal gender after a psychiatric evaluation, without the requirement for surgery or a court decision. In 2020, during the COVID-19 pandemic, the clause in the law allowing for legal gender recognition was quietly removed.

According to a report by international LGBTQ organisation ILGA-Europe, transgender people in Kyrgyzstan have been unable to obtain legal gender recognition since 2021 due to amendments which were made to the Law on Civil Acts. Since 2024, the rights of transgender people in Kyrgyzstan have been further restricted by amendments to existing laws such as the law On the Protection of the Health of Citizens in the Kyrgyz Republic. Clause 47 of the law relates to "Change and Correction of Gender Identity" and has been modified by the Kyrgyz government to prevent trans people in the country from accessing transition-related care before the age of 25. Previously, individuals could start the process of gender transition at age 18.

On 30 January 2026, a draft law was proposed to the Kyrgyz parliament effectively prohibiting transgender individuals from changing their gender markers, and accessing gender affirming care and surgeries. On 4 June 2026, it was approved in its first reading.

== Living conditions ==
Homophobia in Kyrgyzstan is a complex issue with roots in two distinct external influences. The Russian influence is tied to a Soviet-era legacy and contemporary anti-propaganda laws. The 2013 Russian law banning "propaganda of non-traditional sexual relations to minors" has been particularly influential. This was a clear signal from a major regional power that LGBTQ+ identities are abnormal and should not be discussed openly. The use of Russian-language media, which often echoes this sentiment, further reinforces these homophobic views in Kyrgyzstan. Russian-language media, which is widely consumed in Kyrgyzstan, often portrays the West as hostile, morally corrupt, and a threat to traditional values. Following the collapse of the Soviet Union, Kyrgyzstan experienced a religious revival. This created an opening for countries like Saudi Arabia and Qatar, which are major centers of Wahhabism and other fundamentalist interpretations of Islam. The spread of these conservative religious views through mosques, madrasas, and online content provides a theological justification for homophobic attitudes. These two forces often reinforce each other, creating a challenging environment for LGBTQ+ people in Kyrgyzstan. As a result, LGBTQ people fear being socially outcast by their friends and families, causing them to keep their sexual orientation or gender identity secret, especially in rural areas.

Before the 2010s, ignorance about LGBTQ rights resulted in a somewhat "liberal" scene and safe haven for LGBTQ people, especially in the capital Bishkek. In 2014, however, the Government launched a series of legal reforms including an "anti-gay propaganda law". This has led to the LGBTQ community being thrust into the spotlight, and a near 300% increase in attacks against LGBTQ people.

Bishkek's only gay bar, London, had to shut down in 2017.

According to 2018 reports, police officials have been blackmailing LGBTQ people on social media and dating sites, requesting between 5000 and 30,000 soms (70 to 500 U.S. dollars).

=== Activism ===
There are multiple LGBTQ groups in Kyrgyzstan, including Kyrgyz Indigo (Kyrgyz: Кыргыз Индиго), founded in 2010 and Labrys (Лабрис), founded in 2004. Labrys staff also conduct training for doctors and psychiatrists on sexual orientation and gender identity. Another organisation, Oasis, was founded in 1995 and mainly catered to gay men, while MyrzAyim supports trans sex workers.

In recent years, politicians have increasingly used homophobic language. On 8 March 2019, a peaceful march of about 400 people occurred in the capital Bishkek. Although the march was meant to commemorate International Women's Day, LGBTQ issues were given special focus and attention. The media dubbed the event Kyrgyzstan's "first gay pride march". The event was not received without controversy, especially from members of parliament who expressed threats of violence towards the participants. MP Jyldyz Musabekova wrote on Facebook that "the men who do not want to have children and the girls who do not want to pour tea...must not only be cursed, they must be beaten". She was quickly condemned by other deputies.

Human rights groups and the event's organisers defended the march and the presence of LGBTQ rainbow flags. Bektour Iskender, founder of the popular Kloop news website and a participant in the march, said, "I think it's very cool that the LGBTQ community came on the march, because this is also related to the rights of women if we are talking about lesbians and transgender girls who face tremendous violence in Kyrgyzstan". LGBTQ activists described the event as "a turning point".

=== Freedom of expression ===
In 2014, a bill was introduced to the parliament to criminalize expression that creates "a positive attitude toward non-traditional sexual relations, using the media or information and telecommunications networks." The bill passed its first reading on October 15 with a 79–7 vote, despite wide international opposition. A final vote was expected in 2016 but was repeatedly delayed. The bill ultimately expired without a vote at the end of the legislative session.

On 17 March 2023, the government announced a proposal to amend the child protection law. Article 2-1 of the draft law expands the definition of information harmful to the health and development of children to include content that: "denounces family and traditional societal values, promotes non-traditional sexual relations and initiates disrespect towards parents or other family members". The bill was passed by parliament on 22 June 2023 and signed into law by the president on 14 August 2023. The law also includes other amendments, such as prohibiting the promotion of information that encourages children to commit suicide, consume drugs, tobacco and alcohol, participate in gambling, prostitution and begging. The law neither defines key terms such as "family values" or "non-traditional sexual relations," nor does it explicitly mention sexual orientation and homosexuality.

== Summary table ==
Same-sex sexual activity legal	Yes (Since 1998)
Equal age of consent (16)	Yes (Since 1998)
Freedom of expression	Yes / No (Some laws censor LGBT issues)
Anti-discrimination laws in employment only	No
Anti-discrimination laws in the provision of goods and services	No
Anti-discrimination laws in all other areas (including indirect discrimination, hate speech)	No
Same-sex marriages	No (Constitutional ban since 2016)
Recognition of same-sex couples	No
Stepchild adoption by same-sex couples	No
Joint adoption by same-sex couples	No
LGBT people allowed to serve openly in the military	No
Right to change legal gender	No
Access to IVF for lesbians	No
Commercial surrogacy for gay male couples	No
MSMs allowed to donate blood	Yes

== See also ==
- Dastan Kasmamytov
- Human rights in Kyrgyzstan
- LGBT rights in Asia
