= Dastaan =

Dastaan or Dastan (Persian: داستان, romanized: dâstân, lit. 'story, tale') may refer to:

== Common uses ==
- Dastan, an ornate form of oral history from Central Asia, Iran, Turkey, and Azerbaijan
- Dastangoi, an Urdu oral storytelling art form

== Film and television ==
- Dastan (1950 film), an Indian drama film
- Dastaan (1972 film), an Indian thriller film
- Dastaan (1995 TV series), an Indian drama television series
- Dastaan (2010 TV series), a Pakistani drama television series

== People ==
- Dastan Jumabekov (born 1976), Kyrgyz politician
- Dastan Kasmamytov (born 1991), Kyrgyz activist
- Dastan Mukashbekov (born 1990), Kazakhstani athlete
- Dastan Sarygulov (born 1947), Kyrgyz businessman and politician
- Dastan Satpayev (born 2008), Kazakh footballer
- Batuhan Daştan (1997), Turkish chess player
- Shahryar Dastan (born 1976), Iranian footballer

== Other uses ==
- Dastan Ensemble, an Iranian classical music ensemble
- Prince Dastan, the protagonist of the film Prince of Persia: The Sands of Time
