= Alina Anisimova =

Kyrgyzs activist and engineer (born 1999)

Alina Anisimova (born 1999) is a social and feminist activist, student and programmer from Bishkek, Kyrgyzstan. Between 2018 and 2021 Anisimova was involved in coaching a team of nine young women engineers in the Kyrgyz Space Programme in a project to design and construct a CubeSat satellite, that will be launched into space. In 2018, the BBC selected Anisimova as one of the 100 most influential women in the world. In July 2021, Anisimova resigned from coaching the women of the Kyrgyz Space Programme.

== History ==
The Kyrgyz Space Programme was started in March 2018 and consists of a team of nine women students, aged between 17 and 25, that was coached by Anisimova at the start of the project. Anisimova is a true hacker, who began to teach herself about computers when she was aged six, by taking apart computer equipment and later following online tutorials. The idea for the Kyrgyz Space Programme came from a chance meeting between Alexander MacDonald, a NASA economist who runs the NASA's Emerging Space initiative and a newspaper publisher, Bektour Iskender, who created Kloop, that is known for promoting LGBTQ and women rights in Kyrgyzstan. MacDonald suggested to Klopp, the idea of designing a cubesat in Kyrgyzstan. She left the project in 2021.
