= Asylbek =

Asylbek is both a given name and a surname. Notable people with the name include:

- Asylbek Jeenbekov (born 1963), Kyrgyzstani politician
- Asylbek Talasbayev (born 1982), Kyrgyzstani boxer
- Zere Asylbek (born 1999), Kyrgyz singer-songwriter
