= Zere (name) =

Zere is both a given name and a surname. Notable people with the name include:

- Zere Asylbek (born 1999), Kyrgyz singer-songwriter
- Patrice Zéré (born 1970), Ivorian footballer
