= Makhabat Tazhibek Kyzy =

Kyrgyz journalist

- Born: 13 May 1991; Issyk-Kul Region
- Alma mater: Kyrgyz National University
- Occupation: Journalist
- Employer: Temirov Live
- Spouse(s): Bolot Temirov

Makhabat Tazhibek Kyzy (Kyrgyz: Махабат Тажибек кызы; born May 13, 1991) is a Kyrgyz investigative journalist, who has been arrested for her work with the anti-corruption news portal Temirov Live. Following the arrest and deportation of her journalist husband, Bolot Temirov, in 2022, Tazhibek Kyzy succeeded him as the director of Temirov Live. As of October 10, 2024, she herself was sentenced to a six-year prison term for her work as an investigative journalist. Their son was officially made a ward of the state rather than being legally designated to the care of family members. International human rights organizations consider Tazhibek Kyzy's arrest to be part of a broader pattern of attempts by the Kyrgyz government to silence critics and have called for the dropping of charges and her release. She has been the subject of an Amnesty International urgent action. There are concerns for her safety in prison.

== Early life and education ==
Makhabat Tazhibek Kyzy was born on May 13, 1991, in the Issyk-Kul Region of Kyrgyzstan. She is a Multiple Grand Prix winner in competitions for traditional storytelling (dastanchi) and poetry (manaschi). She entered Kyrgyz National University in 1999 to study law, but left school in her third year due to disagreement with Soviet teaching methods.

Tazhibek Kyzy worked as a journalist from 2008 to 2014. From 2018 to 2020, she worked at Factcheck.kg, Politmer.kg and Ediviso. Temirov Live was founded in 2020 by Bolot Temirov, previously the editor-in-chief at Factсheck.kg, to fight corruption in Kyrgyzstan. One distinctive feature of Temirov Live was the publication of investigations narrated by poets (akyns) in a Kyrgyz traditional style. In 2021, Tazhibek Kyzy joined Temirov Live and founded its social media channel Ait Ait Dese.

== Career ==
In 2022, Tazhibek Kyzy appeared at the World Justice Forum where she spoke about the arrest of Bolot Temirov. Temirov was arrested on January 22, 2022 after Temirov Live published an exposé alleging corruption involving President Sadyr Japarov and security chief Kamchybek Tashiev. On November 23, 2022 Temirov's Kyrgyz citizenship was unlawfully revoked and he was deported to Russia. Following the arrest, Tazhibek Kyzy took over management of Temirov Live.

On January 16, 2024, Tazhibek Kyzy and 10 other journalists associated with Temirov Live and its social media channel Ait Ait Dese were arrested in what Amnesty International has described as "a heavy-handed police operation" in which they were denied access to a lawyer. They were tried in court on charges of producing and distributing content held to be "obliquely conspiring to incite mass unrest" by “discrediting” Kyrgyz authorities. International human rights organizations consider these charges to be unsubstantiated.

As of October 10, 2024, in Leninsky District Court in Bishkek, Makhabat Tazhibek Kyzy was convicted and was sentenced to a six-year prison term. In addition, the 12-year-old son of Temirov and Tazhibek Kyzy was made a ward of the state, an unusual and concerning decision since relatives were available to care for him. He has since been reported to be living with his grandmother. Akyn Azamat Ishenbekov was convicted to a five-year prison term, and Aktilek Kaparov and Ayke Beyshekeeva received five-year sentences which were commuted to three years of probation. The other seven defendants were acquitted. An appeal on December 18, 2024 upheld the four convictions.

In December 2024, the journalists' lawyer, Samat Matsakov, was arrested on fraud charges. Human rights organizations consider his arrest to be retaliation for his representation of the Temirov Live activists. International human rights organizations see the arrests of those associated with Temirov Live as part of a broader pattern of attempts by the Kyrgyz government to silence critics and have called for the dropping of charges against them and their release.

There have been concerns about Tazhibek Kyzy's safety. Claims that she was physically assaulted on April 4, 2024 while in detention prior to trial were dismissed by prosecutors. There also have been reports that she was being subjected to harassment and repeated death threats by another inmate in prison. Representatives of the National Center of the Kyrgyz Republic for the Prevention of Torture visited her in February 2025, and reported that the issues had been resolved. A collective statement from international human rights organizations including Human Rights Watch, International Partnership for Human Rights, Front Line Defenders, and International Federation for Human Rights, has called on Kyrgyzstan to ensure Makhabat Tazhibek Kyzy's safety.

As of April 9, 2025, it was announced that President Sadyr Japarov would grant a pardon to Azamat Ishenbekov. His release is credited to international expressions of concern over press freedom and human rights. Tazhibek Kyzy at that point became the only person from Temirov Live to remain in prison.

On 10 March 2026, the Supreme Court overturned Tazhibek Kyzy's conviction and ordered a retrial of her case. On 23 March, the Lenin District Court of Bishkek ordered Tazhibek Kyzy's release, replacing her custodial sentence with travel restrictions. The Committee to Protect Journalists welcomed Tazhibek Kyzyz's release, and urged Kyrgyz authorities to drop all the charges against her.
