= Bolot Temirov =

Kyrgyz investigative journalist

- Болот Темиров
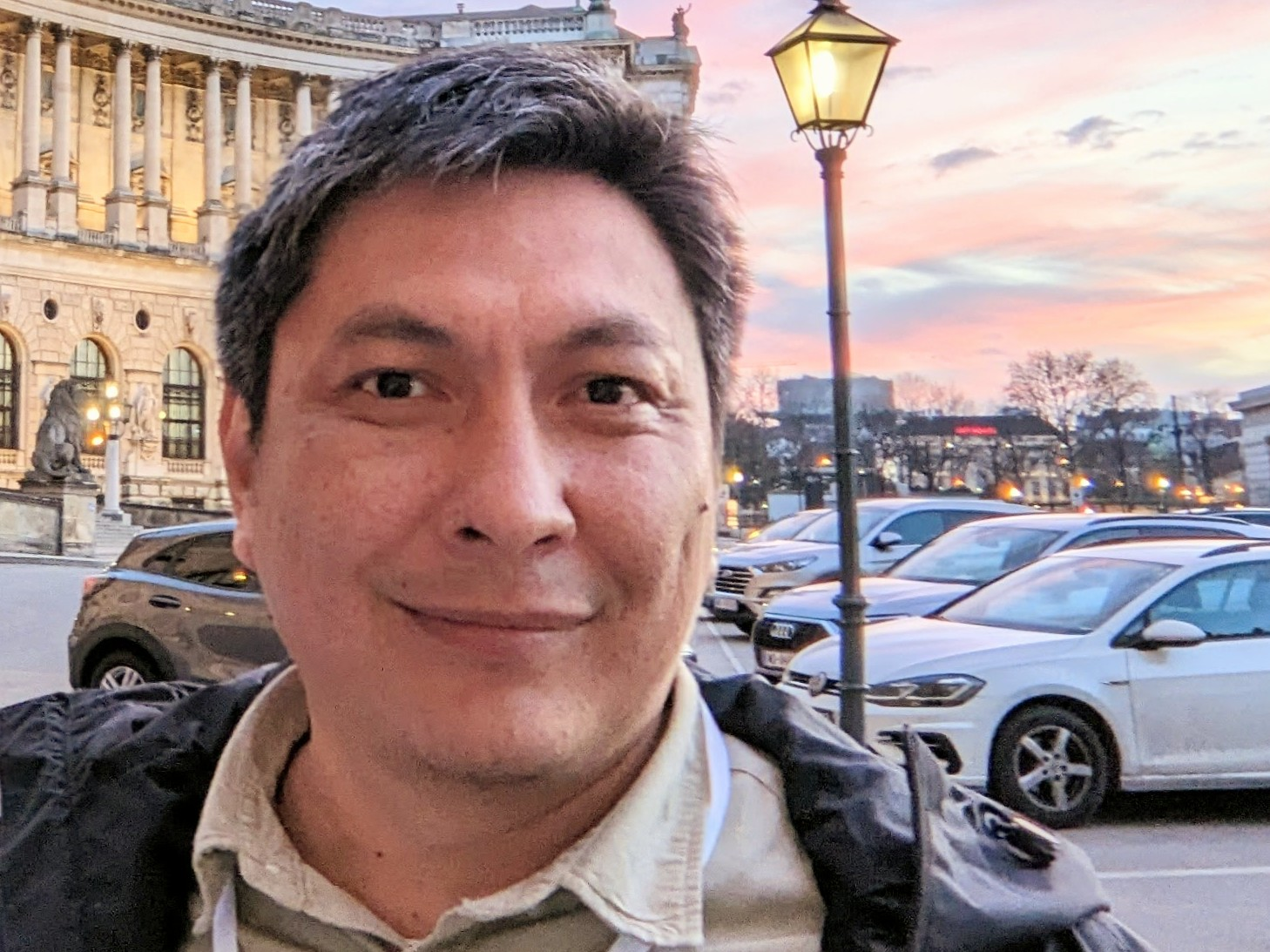
- Born: November 25, 1979 (age 46); Osh, Kirghiz SSR, USSR
- Education: Moscow State University
- Occupation: Journalist
- Spouse: Makhabat Tazhibek Kyzy
- Awards: Anticorruption Champion Award by the United States Department of State

Bolot Mamatkasymovich Temirov (Kyrgyz: Болот Маматкасымович Темиров; born on November 25, 1979) is a Kyrgyz investigative journalist. He is the co-founder of Temirov Live, one of the leading investigative media outlets in Kyrgyzstan. Under his leadership, Temirov Live gained significant renown for its investigations into high-ranking officials in Kyrgyzstan, including President Sadyr Japarov and security chief Kamchybek Tashiev.

In November 2022, Temirov was expelled from Kyrgyzstan, six months after being stripped of his Kyrgyz citizenship. The Bishkek City Court found him guilty of "document fraud," resulting in his forcible deportation to Russia, where he holds second citizenship. Temirov, along with media watchdogs such as Reporters Without Borders, claimed that his expulsion was illegal and orchestrated by Kyrgyz authorities as retaliation for his investigative work. Since then, Temirov has been managing his media operations from exile, residing in an undisclosed location in Europe.

== Early life ==
Temirov was born in Osh, Kyrgyzstan, which was then part of the Soviet Union. During his childhood, his family, like many other Kyrgyz families, relocated to Russia. He attended School No. 194 in Moscow and later graduated with a bachelor's degree in Sociology from Moscow State University.

While living in Russia, he used a Soviet passport until 2001, when he obtained Russian citizenship. In 2008, Temirov returned to Kyrgyzstan, where he was subsequently issued a Kyrgyz passport.

== Career ==
Temirov began his journalism career in 2011 by launching the investigative TV program "Fourth Power" on Channel Five, which was a private Kyrgyz TV channel at the time. The program aired for six months. In 2015 Temirov co-founded a video production company in Bishkek, Kyrgyzstan.

In 2018, Temirov became the editor-in-chief of Factcheck, an investigative media organization in Kyrgyzstan. During his time there, he led several high-profile investigations that gained significant attention across the country. In 2021, Temirov received Anticorruption Champion award from the US Department of State for his work at Factcheck.

=== Assault after corruption investigations ===
In January 2020, Temirov was attacked in downtown Bishkek by three unidentified assailants while on his way to work. Following the incident, he was briefly hospitalized and treated for a concussion. This occurred shortly after Factcheck was targeted in a cyber-attack. Reporters Without Borders suggested that both the physical assault and cyber-attack were likely connected to Factcheck's investigations into the wealth of the influential Kyrgyz Customs boss, Raimbek Matraimov.

Four men suspected of involvement in the attack on Temirov were later detained by the Kyrgyz police. They were sentenced to fines and two years in prison; however, they were promptly released under an amnesty. The identity of the person who ordered the attack remains unknown.

=== Establishment of Temirov Live and the 2022 arrest ===
The same month Temirov was assaulted in Bishkek, he launched Temirov Live, a YouTube channel that would eventually grow into an independent media outlet. Temirov Live quickly gained prominence for its investigations, primarily targeting the ruling elite of Kyrgyzstan who assumed power after the 2020 revolution. One distinctive feature of Temirov Live was the publication of some investigations narrated by poets (akyns) in the Kyrgyz traditional style.

On January 20, 2022, Temirov Live released a video exposing a corruption scheme involving Kyrgyzstan's security chief, Kamchybek Tashiev. Two days later, Kyrgyz police raided the Temirov Live office and arrested Temirov on drug charges. While Kyrgyz police officers claimed they found marijuana in Temirov's pockets, the journalist maintained that the drugs had been planted on him.

In April 2022, the Bishkek city police filed additional charges against Temirov, including "illegal crossing of the state border" and "document forgery," alleging that he had obtained his Kyrgyz citizenship illegally. A month later, on May 17, 2022, the Ministry of Interior declared Temirov's Kyrgyz passport void, thus leaving him only with Russian citizenship.

=== Deportation from Kyrgyzstan ===
After drug tests indicated that Temirov had not consumed marijuana, he was acquitted of all drug-related charges in September 2022. However, two months later, he was deported from Kyrgyzstan to Russia for "document forgery." Temirov's lawyers expressed concern over the procedural violations surrounding his deportation. He was not permitted to see his family or collect his personal belongings before being expelled from the country.

Since then, Temirov has been residing in exile at an undisclosed location within the European Union.

== Personal life ==
Temirov's wife, Makhabat Tazhybek kyzy, collaborates with him at Temirov Live. Following Temirov's deportation, she remained in Kyrgyzstan. In January 2024, she was arrested alongside several other Temirov Live employees during a crackdown by Kyrgyz authorities.
