= Samat Matsakov =

Kyrgyzstani lawyer

Samat Matsakov (Kyrgyz: Самат Матцаков) is a Kyrgyzstani human rights lawyer who became known for his defence of various activists, including the akyn Askat Zhetigen, the opposition politician Imamidin Tashov, and several journalists working for the investigative media outlet Temirov Live. In 2024, Matsakov was arrested on fraud charges that several human rights organisations described as politically motivated.

== Career ==
After qualifying as a lawyer, Matsakov became known for representing detainees who had been accused of "inciting civil unrest", in addition to people who alleged torture by agents of the State Committee for National Security (UKMK).

In 2024, Matsakov took part in three widely publicised cases within Kyrgyzstan. In January, journalists from the investigative media outlet Temirov Live including Makhabat Tazhibek Kyzy, Azamat Ishenbekov, Aike Beyshekeeva and Aktilek Kaparov, were accused of calling for "mass riots" after investigating high-level corruption amongst various Kyrgyzstani agencies; Matsakov represented the journalists, who were ultimately found guilty in October. Matsakov also represented the akyn Askat Zhetigen, who was arrested after criticising Sadyr Japarov, the President of Kyrgyzstan, on social media, and who was sentenced to three years imprisonment in July. At the time of his arrest, Matsakov had been representing former presidential candidate Imamidin Tashov, who had been arrested in April on charges of attempting to call for a seizure of power from the Kyrgyzstani government, and who had alleged he had been tortured while detained.

== Arrest and detainment ==
On 29 November 2024, Matsakov's home was raided, and he was arrested and subsequently charged with fraud on a large scale in addition to false documentation, under articles 209 and 379 of Kyrgyzstan's criminal code. During his interrogation, Matsakov was prevented from accessing legal representation despite at least ten colleagues arriving to represent him. On 30 November, the Birinchi May District Court of the City of Bishkek ruled that Matsakov should be detained at the Pre-Trial Detention Centre of the UKMK until 30 December.

On 2 December 2024, the Advokatura of the Kyrgyz Republic noted that legal precedents had not been followed, pointing out that only the prosecutor general or their deputy had the authority to initiate a criminal case against a lawyer in connection to their professional activities, and called on the authorities to comply with the guarantees around the independence and integrity of Matsakov's trial. On 4 December, a press conference held by several prominent lawyers called publicly for Matsakov's immediate release, describing the charges against him as being "politically motivated" and representing a larger threat to the integrity of the Kyrgyzstani legal and judicial systems. Matsakov and his legal team argued that he was being targeted due to his work representing human rights activists, and trial observers noted that the defence had been denied access to documents that the prosecution alleged proved Matsakov's guilt, citing "investigate secrecy".

On 5 December 2024, the UKMK released a statement accusing Matsakov of stealing $22, 000 through his connections with judiciary officials, and of forging documents to cover up the theft.

On 6 December 2024, whilst still in detention, Matsakov wrote to the court requesting they seek permission from the UKMK for him to attend the trial of his client, Imamidin Tashov; the request was denied by the court, and following the hearing, in which Tashov's own detention was extended, Tashov attempted to slit his throat in the courtroom.

On 30 December 2024, Matsakov's lawyer, Nursultan Zhanibekov, announced that Matsakov's detention had been extended to 28 February 2025.

== Response ==
On 3 December 2024, a joint statement by the International Partnership for Human Rights, the Helsinki Foundation for Human Rights, and the Norwegian Helsinki Committee called for Matsakov's release, noting irregularities in the investigation, including Matsakov's home being searched without a warrant, and case documents for his defence of Imamidin Tashov being seized despite being unrelated to the alleged fraud case. It also reported that Matsakov had been denied access to his family and lawyer in a timely manner. The Diplomat reported that Matsakov was the first defence lawyer to be targeted by the Kyrgyzstani authorities. The Council of Bars and Law Societies of Europe wrote to the Kyrgyzstani Minister of Justice, Ayaz Baetov, expressing its "serious concern" over the arrest and intimidation of Matsakov.

Mary Lawlor, the UN Special Rapporteur on Human Rights Defenders, expressed concerns around Matsakov's arrest, calling it "an apparent violation of procedural guarantees for the arrest and fair trial standards". Front Line Defenders and Human Rights Watch both called for Matsakov's immediate and unconditional release.
