= Dastan Kasmamytov =

Kyrgyz activist

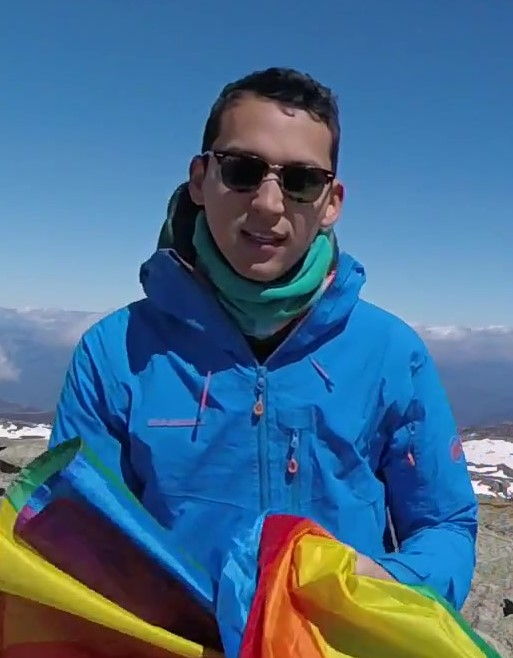
- Born: 1991 or 1992 (age 34–35); Bishkek, Kyrgyzstan
- Education: Oslo/ Norway, Berlin/ Germany

Dastan Kasmamytov or Danik (Kyrgyz: Дастан Касмамытов; born 1991 or 1992), is a Kyrgyz LGBTIQ rights activist.

Kasmamytov is a member of the steering committees of the Global Forum on MSM & HIV and the Eurasian Coalition on Male Health, a board member of Labrys, a co-founder of Bishkek Feminist Collective SQ, and a coordinator for Kyrgyz Indigo, LGBTIQ Initiative and Youth Initiative.

Kasmamytov studied in Metropolitan University in Oslo (Norway), Free University in Berlin (Germany), American University in Central Asia (Kyrgyzstan), Pierce College (USA).

Kasmamytov came out at a press conference on a Human Rights Watch report on police violence against gay and bisexual people in Kyrgyzstan. He has, as a result of coming out and of his activism, received multiple death threats.

Today, Kasmamytov lives and studies in Europe.

Kasmamytov cycled from Central Asia to Germany and founded Pink Summits, a campaign to conquer 7 Summits for the sake of LGBT visibility.

== See also ==
- LGBT rights in Kyrgyzstan
