= Kanyshai Mamyrkulova =

Kyrgyzstani journalist (born 1975)

Kanyshai Asanbekovna Mamyrkulova
- Канышай Асанбековна Мамыркулова
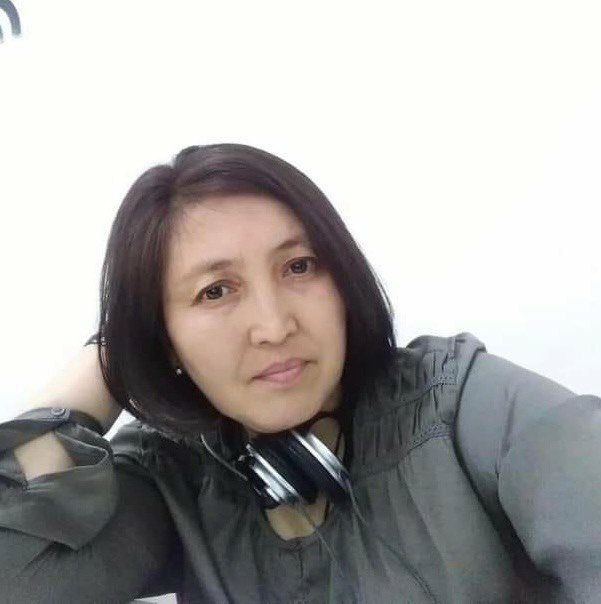
- Born: 25 January 1975 (age 51)
- Occupation: Journalist
- Criminal charges: Calling for mass riots Inciting interethnic discord
- Criminal penalty: Probation

Kanyshai Asanbekovna Mamyrkulova (Kyrgyz: Канышай Асанбековна Мамыркулова; born 25 January 1975) is a Kyrgyzstani journalist known for her criticisms of the government of Kyrgyzstan, for which she was detained and tried in 2025 in a case that was described by human rights groups as politically motivated.

== Career ==
Prior to becoming an independent journalist, Mamyrkulova worked as a correspondent for Issyk-Kul karbarlary, a regional newspaper reporting on news in the Issyk-Kul Region of Kyrgyzstan. She went on serve as the deputy editor of the independent political newspaper Kyrgyz Ruhu between 2005 and 2008, and as the editor and columnist of the legal newspaper Alibi. Between 2016 and 2017, Mamyrkulova was the editor of the independent news channel Sentyabr, and from 2018 and 2019 worked for the multimedia outlet Govori TV. In 2019, Mamyrkulova created her own independent news outlet, MKA-TV.

== Arrest and trial ==
On 20 March 2025, Mamyrkulova was arrested at her home by police officers allegedly disguised as potential buyers for her apartment after making "critical comments" on Facebook about the Kyrgyzstan–Tajikistan border agreement in which she criticised the lack of transparency over the demarcation deal between both countries' governments. On 22 March, she appeared at Sverdlovsky District Court in Bishkek without her lawyer present, where she was charged with "calling for mass riots" and "inciting interethnic discord" in breach of article 278 of the Criminal Code of Kyrgyzstan. A judge made a two-month detention order, with Mamyrkulova being held at a detention centre in Bishkek pending her trial.

Mamyrkulova's trial was scheduled to begin on 14 May 2025, but was delayed after the prosecutor did not attend. Proceedings formally began on 21 May at the Otyabrsky District Court in Bishkek. The prosecution called for Mamyrkulova to receive an eight-year custodial sentence, stating that a forensic linguistic examination of her Facebook posts had "confirmed" the presence of calls for violence. Mamyrkulovsa denied the charges against her, stating the posts did not call for violence but "reflected current issues" in Kyrgyzstan, describing the charges as "politically motivated".

On 3 July 2025, the court sentenced Mamyrkulova to four years of probation, in addition to a travel ban, curfew, and restrictions on what she could post online.

== Response ==
The Media Action Platform of Kyrgyzstan called for Mamyrkulova to be released, stating that her comments did not call for violence, riots, or ethnic division.

The Norwegian Helsinki Committee and the International Partnership for Human Rights called on Kyrgyzstani authorities to release Mamyrkulova and to drop the charges against her, describing the charges against her as being "retaliatory".

Reporters Without Borders expressed concern at Mamyrkulova's arrest under the pretext of "calls for mass unrest", calling on Kyrgyzstani officials to "stop using justice as a tool to silence independent journalists".

The Clooney Foundation for Justice announced in June 2025 that its TrialWatch initiative would be monitoring Mamyrkulova's trial, citing concerns that a number of prosecutions of independent journalists in Kyrgyzstan had been judicially harassed using article 278.

Civil Rights Defenders called Mamyrkulova's sentence, including a travel ban and restrictions on her use of the internet, constituted "a chilling way of silencing her".

Human Rights Watch stated that Mamyrkulova's sentence sent a warning to journalists and activists that "the authorities will not tolerate criticism and are willing to use overly broad criminal provisions to silence critical journalism".
