= Kyrgyz Indigo =

Kyrgyz LGBTQ rights organization

- Кыргыз Индиго
- Formation: 2009; 17 years ago
- Type: Nonprofit; NGO; LGBTQ rights organization; human rights organization

Kyrgyz Indigo (Kyrgyz: Кыргыз Индиго) is a public Kyrgyz LGBTQ rights organization. It is one of the largest human rights organizations in Central Asia and is a proponent of trans rights.

== Objectives ==
The organization is aimed at promoting a healthy LGBTQ lifestyle, preserving Kyrgyz queer people's psychological well-being, providing shelter in Bishkek and Osh, and protecting LGBTQ rights. It also focuses on their physical well-being, such as HIV/AIDS, hepatitis, and tuberculosis prevention and treatment.

One of Kyrgyz Indigo's accomplishments was to lead an educational course on LGBTQ issues for future police officers.

== History ==
Kyrgyz Indigo was founded in Bishkek in 2009 by Daniyar Orsekov, who served as director and later as a board member. The organization is officially registered with the Ministry of Justice as an NGO in 2010.

On the 2019 International Day Against Homophobia, Biphobia and Transphobia, Kyrgyz Indigo held drag queen events in Bishkek.

On April 16, 2021, two people attempted to break into the Bishkek office of Kyrgyz Indigo. A few days later, Kyrgyz Indigo employee's personal data was leaked on YouTube, including full names, dates of birth, sexual orientation, gender identity, and photographs. A few days after that, the Head of Advocacy and Human Rights Department of Kyrgyz Indigo, Nadira Masiumova, was followed by four individuals. In July 2021, the UN Special Rapporteur on Human Rights Defenders wrote a letter to the Government of Kyrgyzstan regarding this alleged surveillance, marginalisation, and harassment of Kyrgyz Indigo employees and of LGBTQ individuals in the country.
