= Temirov Live =

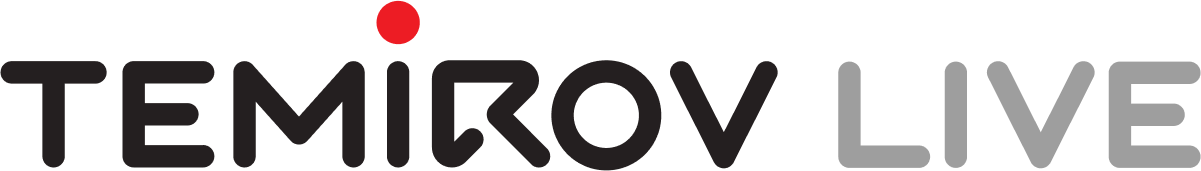
- Available in: Russian, Kyrgyz
- Country of origin: Kyrgyzstan
- Founder: Bolot Temirov
- Website: http://www.youtube.com/@TemirovLIVE

Temirov Live is a YouTube-based investigative media outlet from Kyrgyzstan, renowned for its in-depth investigations into corruption within the highest levels of the Kyrgyz government. Its notable work includes exposing alleged corruption involving President Sadyr Japarov and security chief Kamchybek Tashiev.

Founded in 2020 in Kyrgyzstan, Temirov Live has faced significant pressure from the Kyrgyz authorities. This culminated in January 2024, when 11 of its journalists were arrested amidst the Kyrgyz government's crackdown on independent media. Earlier, the founder, Bolot Temirov, was forced to leave the country and now works in exile.

== History ==
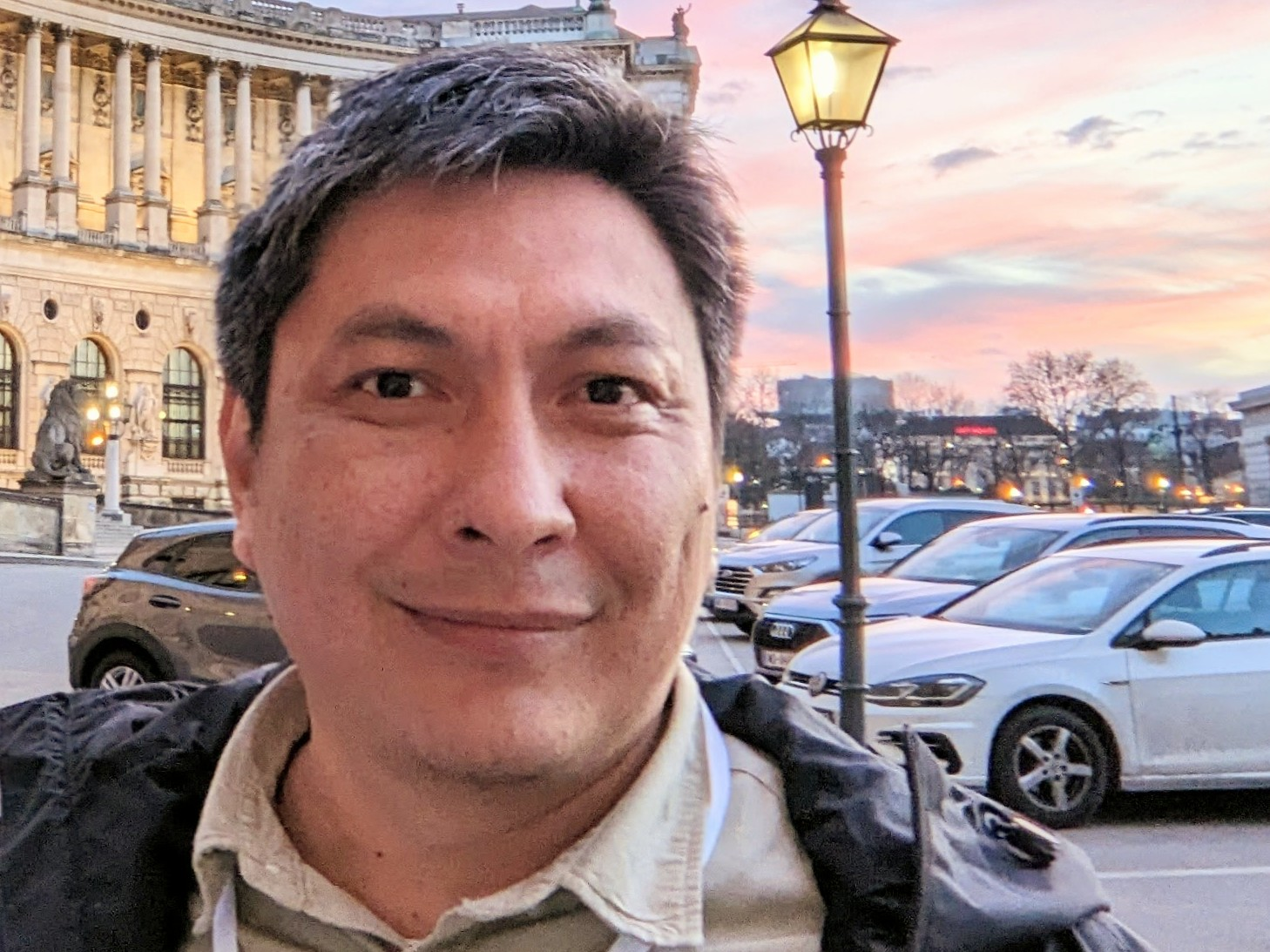
Temirov Live founder Bolot Temirov

Temirov Live was established by journalist Bolot Temirov in August 2020 as a YouTube channel dedicated to unveiling corruption within Kyrgyzstan through investigative reporting. In its first year of operation, Temirov Live produced impactful investigations that reverberated within governmental structures.

In January 2021, a video titled "The Nature of Administrative Influence in Elections" highlighted the enrichment of relatives of Aibek Tokoev, the chief of financial police. This revelation led to Tokoev's subsequent detention for illegal enrichment.

Another investigation, released in February 2021, uncovered how Vasily Dashkov, the head of Kyrgyz Railways, signed contracts with companies he de facto owned himself. This report prompted Dashkov's removal from office and his subsequent detention by the State Committee for National Security (GKNB) on May 18 over suspected corruption charges.

=== Raid on Temirov Live office and deportation of Bolot Temirov ===
Yet, when Temirov Live began probing into Kyrgyz President Sadyr Japarov and the country's powerful GKNB chief Kamchybek Tashiev, the team encountered immense pressure from the authorities. In January 2022, Temirov Live released a video titled "How to Earn 37 Million Soms in Two Days? The Scheme of Japarov and Tashiev." The video exposed how Tashiev and his family had allegedly seized control of Kyrgyzstan's oil refinery industry with assistance provided by President Japarov.

Two days later, masked and armed troops from the Interior Ministry of Kyrgyzstan stormed Temirov Live office in Bishkek without a warning. The police claimed to have found a 7.7-gram bag of hashish in Bolot Temirov's pockets during the raid, while Temirov himself insisted that the drug was planted on him.

Although the drug charges against Temirov were eventually dismissed, he faced expulsion from Kyrgyzstan to Russia in November 2022. The court found him guilty of "document forgery" related to his acquisition of Kyrgyz citizenship in 2008.

During the trial against Temirov and following his deportation from Kyrgyzstan, Temirov Live continued its operations. As Temirov relocated to live in exile in Europe, domestic affairs in Kyrgyzstan came under the management of his wife, Makhabat Tazhibek Kyzy.

=== The arrest of "the Kyrgyz 11" ===
In January 2024, 11 present and past staff members of Temirov Live, including Tazhibek kyzy, were arrested by Kyrgyz police on the same day, marking the most extensive crackdown on independent media in the history of Kyrgyzstan. The authorities claimed Temirov Live was "inciting mass unrest," but human rights groups saw the arrests as part of the Kyrgyz government's effort to silence critics.

Three months later, four out of the 11 detained journalists were placed under house arrest.

In October 2024, the Leninskiy District Court of Bishkek sentenced Tazhibek Kyzy to six years in prison. Another Temirov Live employee, human rights defender Azamat Ishembekov, received a five-year sentence. Two more employees received three years of probation. The court’s decision came despite widespread international appeals from human rights organizations urging the dismissal of charges against the journalists. In December 2024, the journalists' lawyer, Samat Matsakov, was arrested on fraud charges which human rights organisations described as being due to his representation of activists including members of Temirov Live.
