= Zere Asylbek =

Zere Asylbek (Kyrgyz: Зере Асылбек; born 4 December 1998 in Bishkek), commonly known just as Zere, is a Kyrgyz singer-songwriter. Her discography features numerous tracks that advocate for women's autonomy and social rights, frequently challenging the traditional patriarchal structures within Kyrgyz society.

== Biography ==
At 16, she decided to become involved in various NGOs and associations to fight global injustices. For example, she joined the AIESEC. At the encouragement of an American friend to become a singer, Zere began to write songs about social problems such as "lack of economic growth" or "gender inequality".

In her third year of study, she dropped out of her studies in linguistics at Manas University to focus on her artistic and activist mission. In 2018, she was a part-time English teacher while developing her musical career.

The release of Zere’s debut music video, "Kyz" (Girl), in September 2018, triggered a polarized national debate in Kyrgyzstan. The video depicted Zere wearing a purple bra under an open blazer, which many conservative sectors of society viewed as an affront to "national values" and "shameful" (uyat). Following the video's viral spread, Zere received numerous death threats via social media. One specific threat, which she reported to the police, warned that she would be killed if she did not delete the video and "apologize to the Kyrgyz people."

Asylbek performed during the Civil Society Forum ahead of the Beijing+25 Regional Review Meeting in Geneva in 2019. That same year, she moved to Rome, Italy, to study Performing Arts, seeking to integrate her activism with professional theater and stagecraft.

Following her debut album Bashtalo (2018), Zere's musical style evolved to blend Kyrgyz traditional motifs with contemporary alternative sounds:

- 2020: Released "Apam Aitkan" (My Mother Told Me), a track addressing street harassment and violence against women.
- 2023: Released the critically acclaimed album MEN KAIDAMYN (Where Am I), which explores themes of identity and childhood memories using a mix of piano, bass, and traditional elements.
- 2024–2026: Transitioned into a more experimental phase with singles such as "Anything real" (2024) and "Jogolgon Tumar" (2026), the latter released under the qazaq indie label, further establishing her presence in the Central Asian independent music scene.

== Documentary ==
In 2025, director Leigh Iacobucci released A Free Daughter of Free Kyrgyzstan, a feature-length documentary following Asylbek's activism and musical career. The film, Iacobucci's debut as a feature director after 25 years working as a documentary editor and videographer, chronicles Asylbek's journey from her viral debut with "Kyz" through escalating threats and the broader political crackdown in Kyrgyzstan. Rather than relying on graphic depictions of violence against women, the documentary weaves Asylbek's music videos throughout the narrative to illustrate the issues she campaigns against.

The film had its world premiere at DOC NYC in November 2025, followed by a screening at the Slamdance Film Festival in February 2026. It subsequently screened at the Solothurn Film Festival, One World Prague, Movies that Matter in The Hague, and the Human Rights Film Festival Berlin in April 2026. The film was listed among those eligible for the Best Documentary Feature category at the 98th Academy Awards.

== Discography ==
=== Extended plays ===
Title	Details	Tracklist
Bashtalos' (Баштaлось)	Released: December 7, 2018; Language: Kyrgyz, English; Formats: Digital download, streaming	Kyz (Wargo-S Remix); Daddy Told; Men Bashkacha (featuring Beytaanysh); Baby Boy; Ilgeri-Ilgeri

=== Albums ===
Title	Details	Tracklist
EKÉK	Released: August 12, 2021; Language: Kyrgyz, English; Formats: Digital download, streaming	Blow It Up (2:27); Tuura (0:47); Ekék (2:51); Drama Queens (4:17); Sistr (0:33); Apam Aitkan (3:31); Jeñeke (3:21); Hide & Seek help (4:36); Böböchök (feat. Biykech) (2:57); Meili (0:19)
MEN KAIDAMYN	Released: July 21, 2023; Language: Kyrgyz; Formats: Digital download, streaming	Nooruz (5:42); Jañgak (5:48); Jyrgal (3:40); Men Kaidamyn (4:28); Ulamysh (3:11); Choñ Ata (4:16); Tash (2:40); Aiygyp Ket (3:47); Jakshy Kyz (1:32); Jok (1:05); Kyzdar (4:58); Wow (3:38)

=== Singles ===
Year	Title
2018	Kyz
2019	Süyünchü
2020	Apam Aitkan
2021	Drama Queens
2024	Anything real
2025	Paradise
2025	Janym
2025	seasons
2026	Jogolgon Tumar

== See also ==
- Human rights in Kyrgyzstan
