= Kloop =

Kyrgyzstan media organization

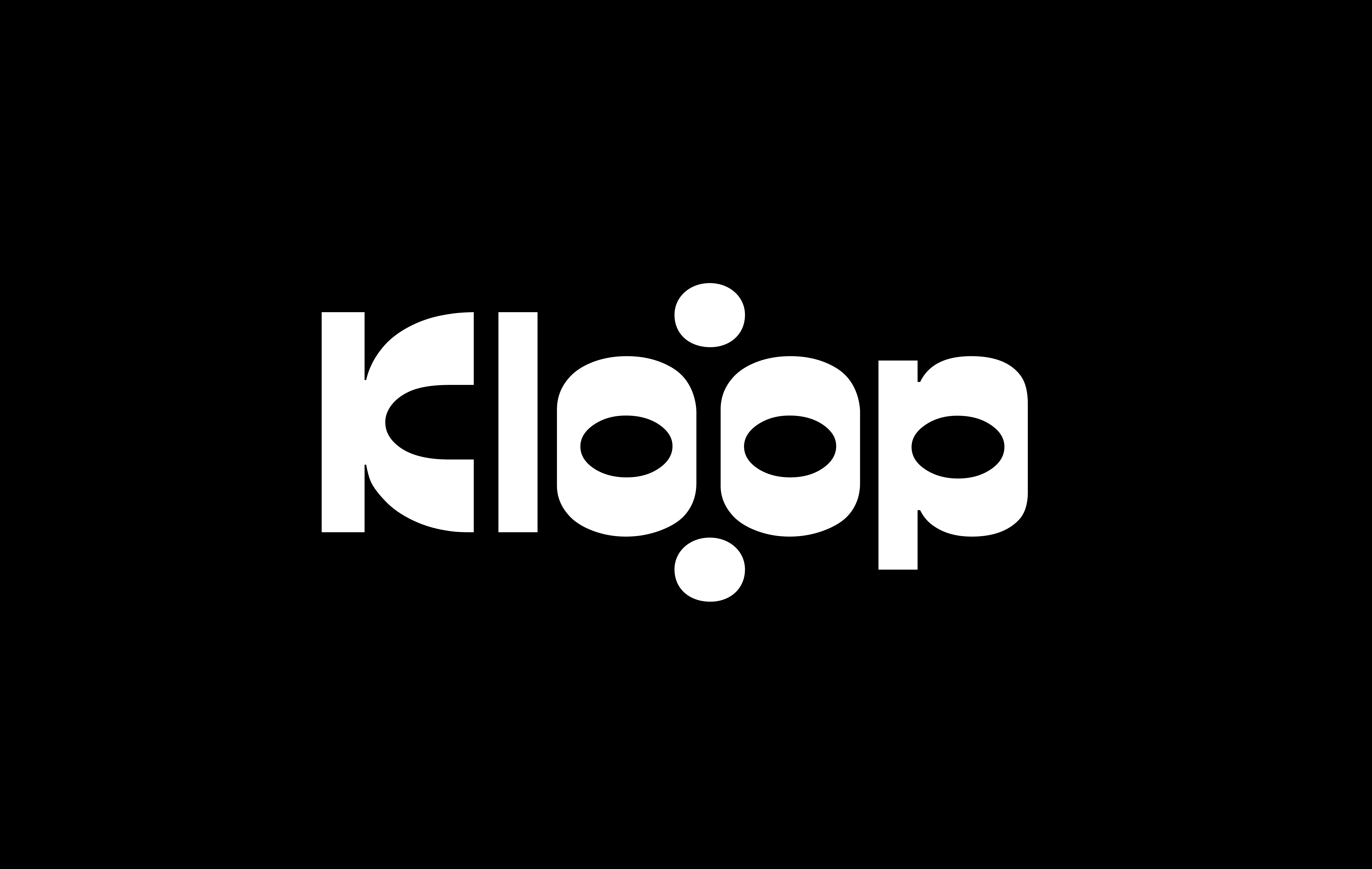
- Website type: News, investigations
- Available in: 3 languages
- List of languages Russian, Kyrgyz, Uzbek
- Country of origin: Kyrgyzstan
- Owner: Kloop Media Foundation
- Founders: Bektour Iskender, Rinat Tuhvatshin
- Editor: Anna Kapushenko (editor-in-chief)
- Website: https://kloop.kg/
- Commercial: No
- Launched: 3 July 2006 (domain registration), 18 June 2007 (actual launch)

Kloop is an independent media organization based in Kyrgyzstan known for its news website and journalism investigations. Founded in 2007, Kloop gained prominence in Kyrgyzstan three years later, when it investigated criminal activities of the son of the president of Kyrgyzstan. Today Kloop is one of the most popular news websites in Kyrgyzstan.

== History ==
Kloop was founded in 2007 by journalists Bektour Iskender and Rinat Tuhvatshin. From the beginning, Kloop worked with young journalists, who were trained at its own journalism school. In February 2010 Kloop's reporters investigated how Maxim Bakiyev, son of then Kyrgyz president Kurmanbek Bakiyev, gained illegal control over Kyrgyztelecom, the country's largest communications provider. After receiving threats for attempts to continue the investigation, Kloop gained more attention two months later for its coverage of the revolution, during which Bakiyev and his family were ousted and forced to live in exile.

== Work ==
=== Samaragate investigation ===
In 2017 Kloop published an investigation about violations at that year's presidential election in Kyrgyzstan. Called Samaragate, the investigation focused on a mysterious Samara website that contained voter information and was hosted on a government server. According to the investigation, this website was used as a voter management system by the campaign of the elected president Sooronbay Jeenbekov to track and influence voters. The investigation was the result of Kloop's cooperation with Qurium, a digital forensic organization based in Sweden that helped track where the suspicious website was hosted

Authorities of Kyrgyzstan threatened to sue Kloop for this series of stories, but this threat was not carried out.

Soon after publishing Samaragate, Kloop was invited to become the first Central Asian member of the global investigative journalism network run by Organized Crime and Corruption Reporting Project (OCCRP).

=== Plunder and Patronage investigation ===
In 2019 Kloop joined forces with OCCRP and the Kyrgyz edition of Radio Liberty to release a series of investigations about the corruption at the Kyrgyz border. Published in November and December simultaneously by all three media organizations, this series revealed a story of an underground cargo empire run by a group of Chinese businessmen, and how they funnelled massive bribes to Kyrgyzstan's customs services. Journalists who worked on the story found evidence of at least $700 million that was laundered by the cargo empire as a result of this scheme.

=== Awards and accolades ===
For the Plunder and Patronage series, Kloop was a joint winner of Tom Renner Award by Investigative Reporters and Editors (IRE).

Samaragate was chosen as one of the best investigative stories from the former Soviet Union by Global Investigative Journalism Network (GIJN) in 2017. A year later, in 2018, Kloop's investigation about a fake military expert from Kyrgyzstan made it to another annual list by GIJN, this time being mentioned as one of the year's best stories in Russian or Ukrainian.

In 2021 Kloop's investigation about femicide in Kyrgyzstan was a winner at the data journalism Sigma Awards.

In 2024 Kloop was awarded Free Media Pioneer award by International Press Institute for "supporting the future of quality media in the country and upholding democracy."

Kloop is also the only Central Asian media outlet that was featured at the TED conference, with its co-founder Bektour Iskender being a TED Senior Fellow.

== Government pressure and legal challenges ==
Since 2019, Kloop has faced sustained pressure from Kyrgyz authorities, including threats to journalists, civil lawsuits, attempts to shut down the outlet, criminal prosecutions of staff, and its eventual designation as an “extremist” organization.

=== Risks and intimidation during investigations ===
While working on the Plunder and Patronage series, journalists faced a number of risks, including a death threat to one of them. One of the main sources for the story, self-confessed money launderer Aierken Saimaiti, was murdered in Istanbul, Turkey, ten days before the first part of the investigation was published.

The investigation caused an outrage in Kyrgyzstan, where two anticorruption protests took place at the end of 2019 as a reaction to what had been revealed.

In December 2019 the family of Raimbek Matraimov, a powerful former Kyrgyz customs official who was described as one of the key people in the criminal scheme, filed a lawsuit against Kloop and Radio Liberty. Reporters Without Borders (RSF), an organization that advocates for the freedom of the press, called this lawsuit absurd and called a Kyrgyz court to dismiss it. The Matraimov family were seeking 780,000 euros in damages in connection with the investigation.

Despite the ongoing legal battle, in June 2020 Kloop, OCCRP, and Radio Liberty published two more parts of the series, this time joined by investigative network Bellingcat. Besides publishing new stories, this time the consortium also published all the originals of the financial documents that were used in the investigation.

Following the 2020 Kyrgyz Revolution, Matraimov was arrested and placed under house arrest. In April 2021 he was released in a controversial move after authorities of Kyrgyzstan claimed he had returned more than $24 million to the state budget. The same month he withdrew his lawsuit against Kloop and Radio Liberty.

=== Attempts to shut down ===
In August 2023 Kyrgyz authorities filed a lawsuit to close down Kloop Media Foundation that runs Kloop. Among the reasons listed were "sharp criticism of the government", which led to a number of human rights organization stating that this case reflects the growing repressive trend against freedom of speech in Kyrgyzstan.

The complaint to the court was filed by Kyrgyz authorities shortly after Kloop published an investigation into the alleged involvement of country's top leadership in a suspicious deal with FC Barcelona on constructing a football academy in Jalalabad, Kyrgyzstan. A week later authorities of Kyrgyzstan continued putting pressure on Kloop by threatening to block the website for its news coverage of the detention of the opposition politician Ravshan Djeenbekov. Kloop responded by filing a complaint against the Ministry of Culture that has been responsible for blocking websites in Kyrgyzstan since 2021.

In February 2024, a Bishkek court ordered the liquidation of the Kloop Media Foundation, and in July 2024 the Supreme Court upheld the decision after a closed hearing.

=== Raids, prosecutions, and convictions ===
In May 2025, the State Committee for National Security conducted raids targeting eight current and former Kloop employees, arresting two of them. Later that summer, arrested journalists Aleksander Aleksandrov and Joomart Duulatov were charged with publicly calling for mass unrest.

In September 2025, a court sentenced Aleksandrov and Duulatov to five years in prison, while two Kloop accountants received three-year probationary sentences. Human rights organizations criticized the trial as flawed and politically motivated. The prison sentences were later converted to probation, and the journalists were released.
