= List of members of the 6th Supreme Council of Kyrgyzstan =

This is a list of current members of the Supreme Council of Kyrgyzstan.

== List ==
#	Deputy	Party
1	Myktybek Abdyldayev	Bir Bol
2	Aliyarbek Abjaliyev	Respublika–Ata Zhurt
3	Salaydin Aydarov	Kyrgyzstan Party
4	Mukhtarbek Aynakulov	Social Democratic Party of Kyrgyzstan
5	Janarbek Akayev	Social Democratic Party of Kyrgyzstan
6	Almasbek Akmatov	Bir Bol
7	Nurbek Alimbekov	Kyrgyzstan Party
8	Aynuru Altybayeva	Social Democratic Party of Kyrgyzstan
9	Aybek Altynbekov	Respublika–Ata Zhurt
10	Marat Amankulov	Social Democratic Party of Kyrgyzstan
11	Azamat Arapbayev	Social Democratic Party of Kyrgyzstan
12	Osmonbek Artykbayev	Social Democratic Party of Kyrgyzstan
13	Anvar Artykov	Social Democratic Party of Kyrgyzstan
14	Asylbaeva Gүlshat Kadyrovna	Onuguu–Progress
15	Asylbek uulu Damirbek	Kyrgyzstan Party
16	Attokurov Danijar Beksultanovich	Social Democratic Party of Kyrgyzstan
17	Baatyrbekov Almazbek Baatyrbekovich	Kyrgyzstan Party
18	Babanov Өmүrbek Toktogulovich	Respublika–Ata Zhurt
19	Bajbakpaev Jekmat Dzhurukpaevich	Respublika–Ata Zhurt
20	Bajmuratov Kaldarbek Shakirovich	Respublika–Ata Zhurt
21	Bakirov Mirlan Isakbekovich	Onuguu–Progress
22	Bakchiev Dzhanybek Abdukaparovich	Bir Bol
23	Bekeshev Dastan Dalabajevich	Social Democratic Party of Kyrgyzstan
24	Bokoev Kenzhebek Satymkulovich	Respublika–Ata Zhurt
25	Dzhakupova Cholpon Idinovna	Bir Bol
26	Zhamaldinov Zijadin Islamovich	Onuguu–Progress
27	Zhamangulov Akylbek Zhekshenovich	Respublika–Ata Zhurt
28	Zhaparov Akylbek Usenbekovich	Bir Bol
29	Zheenchoroev Mirlan Kanatbekovich	Respublika–Ata Zhurt
30	Zhetigenov Bakytbek Zheңishbekovich	Social Democratic Party of Kyrgyzstan
31	Zholdoshbaev Kamchybek Zholdoshbaevich	Onuguu–Progress
32	Zhumabekov Dastanbek Artisbekovich	Kyrgyzstan Party
33	Zhumaliev Kubanychbek Myrzabekovich	Bir Bol
34	Zhunus uulu Adyl	Respublika–Ata Zhurt
35	Zhunus uulu Altynbek	Onuguu–Progress
36	Zhuraev Sajdolimzhon Marufovich	Social Democratic Party of Kyrgyzstan
37	Zhutanov Almaz Toktonazarovich	Onuguu–Progress
38	Zhylkybaev Uzarbek Kazievich	Social Democratic Party of Kyrgyzstan
39	Zhjejenbekov Asylbek Sharipovich	Social Democratic Party of Kyrgyzstan
40	Zulpukarov Tөrөbaj Zakirovich	Social Democratic Party of Kyrgyzstan
41	Zulushev Kurmankul Toktoralyevich	Respublika–Ata Zhurt
42	Ikramov Tazabek Ikramovich	Onuguu–Progress
43	Imanaliev Kanybek Kapashovich	Ata Meken
44	Iminov Farhat Azhmuhanbetovich	Respublika–Ata Zhurt
45	Isaeva Dinara Shertaevna	Respublika–Ata Zhurt
46	Isaev Kanatbek Kedejkanovich	Kyrgyzstan
47	Isaev Tilektesh Karimovich	Social Democratic Party of Kyrgyzstan
48	Isakov Muzaffar Ahmathodzhaevich	Social Democratic Party of Kyrgyzstan
49	Isakunova Taalajkul Bazarkulovna	Kyrgyzstan
50	Ismailova Aida Zhekshenbaevna	Respublika–Ata Zhurt
51	Kadyrkulov Iskender Anarbekovich	Social Democratic Party of Kyrgyzstan
52	Kazakbaev Ruslan Ajtbaevich	Respublika–Ata Zhurt
53	Kalmamatov Zhyrgalbek Ajtievich	Kyrgyzstan
54	Karimov Nodirbek Tohtosinovich	Social Democratic Party of Kyrgyzstan
55	Koduranova Asel Sojuzbekovna	Social Democratic Party of Kyrgyzstan
56	Konushbaev Tynchtykbek Kadyrbekovich	Kyrgyzstan
57	Kulbarakov Abtandil Ilduzovich	Social Democratic Party of Kyrgyzstan
58	Kydyraliev Umbetaly Toktoralievich	Respublika–Ata Zhurt
59	Mavljanova Mahabat Jergeshovna	Respublika–Ata Zhurt
60	Mademinov Muradyl Ganyevich	Social Democratic Party of Kyrgyzstan
61	Makeev Nurlanbek Kadykeevich	Kyrgyzstan
62	Mamatov Abdimuktar Mamatovich	Ata Meken
63	Mamashova Ajsuluu Turusbekovna	Ata Meken
64	Mamytov Talant Turdumamatovich	Respublika–Ata Zhurt
65	Mannanov Il'hom Abdukaharovich	Social Democratic Party of Kyrgyzstan
66	Masabirov Taalajbek Ajtmamatovich	Kyrgyzstan
67	Masaliev Ishak Absamatovich	Onuguu–Progress
68	Matraimov Iskender Ismailovich	Social Democratic Party of Kyrgyzstan
69	Miskenbaev Mjejerbek Zhajloobaevich	Social Democratic Party of Kyrgyzstan
70	Moldobekova Gulkan Sakinovna	Social Democratic Party of Kyrgyzstan
71	Mombekov Ryskeldi Chynybekovich	Social Democratic Party of Kyrgyzstan
72	Musabekova Zhyldyz Amanbekovna	Social Democratic Party of Kyrgyzstan
73	Nazarov Ajtmamat Koshoevich	Kyrgyzstan
74	Nikitenko Natal'ja Vladimirovna	Ata Meken
75	Nishanov Nurgazy Nurlanovich	Respublika–Ata Zhurt
76	Nurbaev Abdyvahap Mamadrasulovich	Social Democratic Party of Kyrgyzstan
77	Nurmatov Kubanychbek Sovetovich	Kyrgyzstan
78	Nyshanov Sajdulla Kanbolotovich	Ata Meken
79	Omurbekova Altynaj Sejtbekovna	Respublika–Ata Zhurt
80	Өmүrkulov Isa Shejshenkulovich	Social Democratic Party of Kyrgyzstan
81	Ormonov Ulugbek Zulpukarovich	Bir Bol
82	Orozova Karamat Babashevna	Social Democratic Party of Kyrgyzstan
83	Pirmatov Ishak Ajtbaevich	Bir Bol
84	Primov Ulan Berdibaevich	Social Democratic Party of Kyrgyzstan
85	Rajymkulov Baktybek Kemelbekovich	Respublika–Ata Zhurt
86	Ryspaev Kozhobek Zhajchybekovich	Social Democratic Party of Kyrgyzstan
87	Sabirov Maksat Jesenovich	Respublika–Ata Zhurt
88	Saljanova Aida Zhenishbekovna	Ata Meken
89	Samaev Urmatbek Obozbekovich	Kyrgyzstan
90	Samatov Zhyrgalbek Alimbaevich	Respublika–Ata Zhurt
91	Samigullina Al'fija Jel'darovna	Social Democratic Party of Kyrgyzstan
92	Satybaldiev Kyjanbek Urmamatovich	Social Democratic Party of Kyrgyzstan
93	Strokova Evgenija Grigor'evna	Social Democratic Party of Kyrgyzstan
94	Subanbekov Bakirdin Zhamalovich	Bir Bol
95	Sulajmanov Altynbek Turdubaevich	Bir Bol
96	Sulejmanov Bahadyr Iskakovich	Ata Meken
97	Sultanbekova Cholpon Aalyevna	Kyrgyzstan
98	Sultanov Abdykapar Madanbekovich	Onuguu–Progress
99	Surabaldieva Jel'vira Zhyrgalbekovna	Social Democratic Party of Kyrgyzstan
100	Sydykov Baktybek Usenovich	Respublika–Ata Zhurt
101	Tekebaev Omurbek Chirkeshovich	Ata Meken
102	Tillaev Taabaldy Gapyrovich	Respublika–Ata Zhurt
103	Toktorov Almazbek Satievich	Kyrgyzstan
104	Toktoshev Jemil' Toktakunovich	Ata Meken
105	Tolonov Danijar Jermekovich	Kyrgyzstan
106	Tөrөbaev Bakyt Jergeshevich	Onuguu–Progress
107	Tulendybaev Parhat Rozymovich	Respublika–Ata Zhurt
108	Tumanbaeva Rada Muratalyevna	Respublika–Ata Zhurt
109	Tursunbaev Azizbek Atakozuevich	Kyrgyzstan
110	Tursunbekov Chynybaj Akunovich	Social Democratic Party of Kyrgyzstan
111	Turuskulov Zhyrgalbek Kuruchbekovich	Respublika–Ata Zhurt
112	Uzakbaev Abylkajyr Osmonbekovich	Onuguu–Progress
113	Cholponbaev Ulan Saparbekovich	Respublika–Ata Zhurt
114	Chudinov Igor' Vital'evich	Bir Bol
115	Shadiev Askarbek Alimbaevich	Bir Bol
116	Shajnazarov Tynchtyk Urajimovich	Onuguu–Progress
117	Sher-Nijaz Sadyk	Ata Meken
118	Shykmamatov Almambet Nasyrkanovich	Ata Meken
119	Jegemberdiev Maksatbek Bakirovich	Social Democratic Party of Kyrgyzstan
120	Jusurov Abdumazhit Lelezovich	Onuguu–Progress
