= Elections in Kyrgyzstan =

Kyrgyzstan elects on the national level a head of state – the president – and a legislature. The president is elected for a tenure of single six-year term by the people (previously, the term length was four years and briefly five years). The Supreme Council (Joghorku Keneš) is composed of 120 members filled by proportional representation.

== Latest elections ==
=== Presidential elections ===
As of 14 November 2020, 63 individuals had filed applications to run for the office. On 4 December, the Central Committee on Elections announced the final list of 19 approved candidates.

It was announced that whilst the requirements for candidacy had been provisionally met by all 19, the final number was subject to decrease pending verification of the signatures provided within their applications. Candidates were permitted to begin formally campaigning from the 15th of December 2020, with 'early' presidential elections scheduled for January 10, 2021.

All candidates officially ran as independents, although some were supported by their respective political parties. On the final electoral ballot were listed 17 candidates including: Sadyr Japarov – aforementioned interim President following the resignation of former-President Sooronbai Jeenbekov – former head of the State National Security Committee (Государственный Комитет Национальной Безопасности) Abdil Segizbayev, journalist Kanybek Imanaliev, ex-deputy head of the Ministry of Internal Affairs (МВД) Kursan Asanov, and entrepreneur Arstanbek Abdyldaev. There was one female registered presidential candidate.

According to a 2021 report by the OSCE (the Organization for Security and Co-operation in Europe), the verification of signatures by the Central Committee on Elections (Центральная Избирательная Комиссия Киргизской Республики) was "transparent and consistent."

Sadyr Japarov won the election handily, receiving nearly 80% of the vote. A total of 10,851 ballots returned were invalid, in addition to 196 which were retrieved from invalid portable ballot boxes. Turnout was 39.16%. The results of the simultaneous constitutional referendum meant that Kyrgyzstan would resort to a 'presidential', rather than a 'parliamentary' style of government.

Fewer than 40% of eligible voters participated in these 'snap' presidential elections. According to Radio Free Europe/ Radio Liberty's Kyrgyz service (Azattyk.org) out of a national 'voting' population of 3.56 million, only 1.354 million ballots were cast. Sadyr Japarov received the 2nd highest percentage of votes in the entire history of Kyrgyz presidential elections – falling just short of Kurmanbek Bakiev's 89.5% in 2005.

According to a 2021 report by the OSCE (the Organization for Security and Co-operation in Europe), the January presidential election in Kyrgyzstan was "well organized and fundamental freedoms were generally respected." However, presidential elections were conducted in synchronicity with 'snap' constitutional referendums that "weakened both the election process and public debate." It is critical that this election was "dominated by one candidate who benefitted from disproportionately large financial means and misuse of administrative resources, resulting in an uneven playing field". Whilst the legal framework of these elections "provides a sound basis for democracy," allegations of such misuse of administrative resources may include the "directed attendance of state employees at rallies… pressure on state officials and voters, as well as concerns about the involvement of organised crime in the election." It is also significant that gender equality issues were "nearly absent" from the campaign.

By the end of 2021, Kyrgyzstan's status according to the 'Freedom of the World Index' declined from 'Partly Free', to 'Not Free' as a result of "deeply flawed parliamentary elections [that] featured significant political violence and intimidation that culminated in the irregular seizure of power…".

| Candidate | Party | Votes | % |
|---|---|---|---|
| Sadyr Japarov | Mekenchil | 1,105,248 | 79.83 |
| Adakhan Madumarov | United Kyrgyzstan | 94,741 | 6.84 |
| Babur Tolbayev | Independent | 32,979 | 2.38 |
| Myktybek Arstanbek | Bir Bol | 23,583 | 1.70 |
| Abdil Segizbaev | Independent | 20,335 | 1.47 |
| Imamidin Tashov | Independent | 16,383 | 1.18 |
| Klara Sooronkulova | Reform | 14,005 | 1.01 |
| Aymen Kasenov | Independent | 12,684 | 0.92 |
| Ulukbek Kochkorov | New Age | 9,397 | 0.68 |
| Kanatbek Isaev | Kyrgyzstan | 8,038 | 0.58 |
| Eldar Abakirov | Independent | 6,996 | 0.51 |
| Baktybek Kalmamatov | Independent | 6,893 | 0.50 |
| Kursan Asanov | Independent | 6,885 | 0.50 |
| Ravshan Jeenbekov | Independent | 2,652 | 0.19 |
| Kanybek Imanaliev | Ata-Meken | 2,490 | 0.18 |
| Jenishbek Baiguttiev | Independent | 1,327 | 0.10 |
| Arstanbek Abdyldayev | For the People | 1,157 | 0.08 |
| Against all | | 18,673 | 1.35 |
| Total | | 1,384,466 | 100.00 |
| Valid votes | | 1,384,466 | 99.21 |
| Invalid/blank votes | | 11,047 | 0.79 |
| Total votes | | 1,395,513 | 100.00 |
| Registered voters/turnout | | 3,563,574 | 39.16 |
Source: CEC, CEC

=== Parliamentary elections ===
Unity received a plurality of votes, beating out the Ata-Zhurt–Mekenim Kyrgyzstan alliance by under one percent, with 46 seats. Ata-Zhurt–Mekenim Kyrgyzstan received 45 seats, while other parties lagged behind. The Kyrgyzstan Party received 16 seats, while United Kyrgyzstan entered parliament for the first time with 13. Several other parties failed to meet the 7% threshold, including Ata Meken, which had been a part of every parliament since the 2010 Kyrgyz Revolution.

Out of the parties that made it into parliament, only United Kyrgyzstan consistently opposes the incumbent government led by President Jeenbekov.

| Party | Votes | % | Seats | +/– |
|---|---|---|---|---|
| Unity | 469,098 | 24.85 | 46 | New |
| Mekenim Kyrgyzstan | 452,971 | 24.00 | 45 | New |
| Kyrgyzstan | 166,861 | 8.84 | 16 | –2 |
| United Kyrgyzstan | 139,736 | 7.40 | 13 | +13 |
| Mekenchil | 132,807 | 7.04 | 0 | New |
| Respublika | 111,302 | 5.90 | 0 | New |
| Ata Meken Socialist Party | 78,165 | 4.14 | 0 | –11 |
| Light of Faith | 64,715 | 3.43 | 0 | New |
| Bir Bol | 58,389 | 3.09 | 0 | –12 |
| Great Crusade | 44,769 | 2.37 | 0 | New |
| Zamandash | 41,720 | 2.21 | 0 | 0 |
| Social Democrats | 41,023 | 2.17 | 0 | New |
| Reform Party | 31,788 | 1.68 | 0 | New |
| Homeland Accord | 12,021 | 0.64 | 0 | New |
| The Centre | 4,185 | 0.22 | 0 | New |
| Party of Veterans of the Afghan War | 3,288 | 0.17 | 0 | New |
| Against all | 34,512 | 1.83 | – | – |
| Total | 1,887,350 | 100.00 | 120 | 0 |
| Valid votes | 1,887,350 | 98.51 | | |
| Invalid/blank votes | 28,607 | 1.49 | | |
| Total votes | 1,915,957 | 100.00 | | |
| Registered voters/turnout | 3,523,554 | 54.38 | | |
Source: CEC

== Parliamentary elections ==
=== 2005 ===
69 seats were won by the ruling party and 6 were won by the opposition. Observers said there "some technical improvements over the first round" but stressed that there remained "significant shortcomings." Following the Tulip Revolution the incomplete results were never complete and the interim president, Kurmanbek Bakiev initially postponed a new round of elections to later in the year, but subsequently put them off beyond 2005.

=== 2000 ===
- Assembly of People's Representatives – 20 February and 12 March 2000
- Legislative Assembly – 20 February and 12 March 2000

Election results: Total seats by party in the Supreme Council were as follows:

- Union of Democratic Forces – 12 (Naryn, Jalalabad)
- Communists – 6 (Bishkek, Tokmok, Isilkul, Talas, Osh)
- My Country Party of Action – 4
- Independents – 73
- Other – 10

note: These results include both the Assembly of People's Representatives and the Legislative Assembly.

=== 1995 ===
- Assembly of People's Representatives – 5 February 1995

note: not all of the 70 seats were filled at the 5 February 1995 elections; as a result, run-off elections were held at later dates; the assembly meets twice yearly

- Legislative Assembly – 5 February 1995

note: not all of the 35 seats were filled at the 5 February 1995 elections; as a result, run-off elections were held at later dates
note: the legislature became bicameral for the 5 February 1995 elections

== See also ==
- Electoral calendar
- Electoral system
