= Nurbek Alimbekov =

Kyrgyz politician

Nurbek Alimbekov Нурбек Каарыевич Алимбеков

Member of the Supreme Council of Kyrgyzstan
- Incumbent
- Assumed office 10 October 2010

Personal details
- Born: Nurbek Kaaryevich Alimbekov; March 13, 1975 (age 50) Papan, Osh Oblast, Kirgiz SSR, Soviet Union (now Kyrgyzstan)
- Party: Respublika Party of Kyrgyzstan (before 2015); Kyrgyzstan Party (after 2015)
- Children: 5
- Education: Osh Technical University; Kyrgyz State National University; Academy of Management under the President of the Kyrgyz Republic

Nurbek Kaaryevich Alimbekov (born 13 March 1975) is a Kyrgyz politician, and current member of the Supreme Council of Kyrgyzstan.

== Early life and education ==
Alimbekov was born on 13 March 1975 in the village of Papan in Osh Oblast in the Kirgiz SSR, now Kyrgyzstan. In 1997 he graduated from Osh Technical University with a degree in technical engineering. He continued his education there in the law faculty, graduating in 2000.

In 2007 he returned to education at Kyrgyz State National University with a degree in finance and credit and in 2012 entered the Academy of Management under the President of the Kyrgyz Republic. Since 2008 he has been a post-graduate economics student of Bishkek State University.

== Career ==
=== Early career, 2003–2005 ===
In 2003 Alimbekov joined as a director of a state enterprise that had the same name as his surname – "Alimbekov". He then moved, in 2005, to work for a year as a specialist for the Ministry of Finance.

=== Company director and local Bishkek deputy, 2008–2010 ===
In 2008, Alimbekov joined the company "Papan Kurulush" as a director, and was also elected to the Bishkek City Kenesh, where he was head of the group of deputies representing the Sverdlovsk district of the city.

=== Jogorku Kenesh deputy, 2010–present ===
Alimbekov was elected as deputy for the Respublika Party of Kyrgyzstan in the 2010 parliamentary election. In that convocation he was deputy chairman of the Committee for Transport, Communications, Architecture and Construction.

In the 2015 parliamentary election he changed his affiliation to the Kyrgyzstan Party.

== Personal life ==
Alimbekov is married, and has five children.

== See also ==
- List of members of the Supreme Council (Kyrgyzstan), 2015–present
