= 2020 Kyrgyz parliamentary election =

← 2015	4 October 2020	2021 →
- All 120 seats in the Supreme Council; 61 seats needed for a majority
- Turnout: 56.50% (▼2.39pp)
Party	Leader	Vote %	Seats	+/–
Birimdik	Marat Amankulov	24.85	46	New
Mekenim Kyrgyzstan	Mirlan Bakirov	24.00	45	New
Kyrgyzstan	Kanatbek Isaev	8.84	16	−2
Butun Kyrgyzstan	Adakhan Madumarov	7.40	13	+13
This lists parties that won seats. See the complete results below.
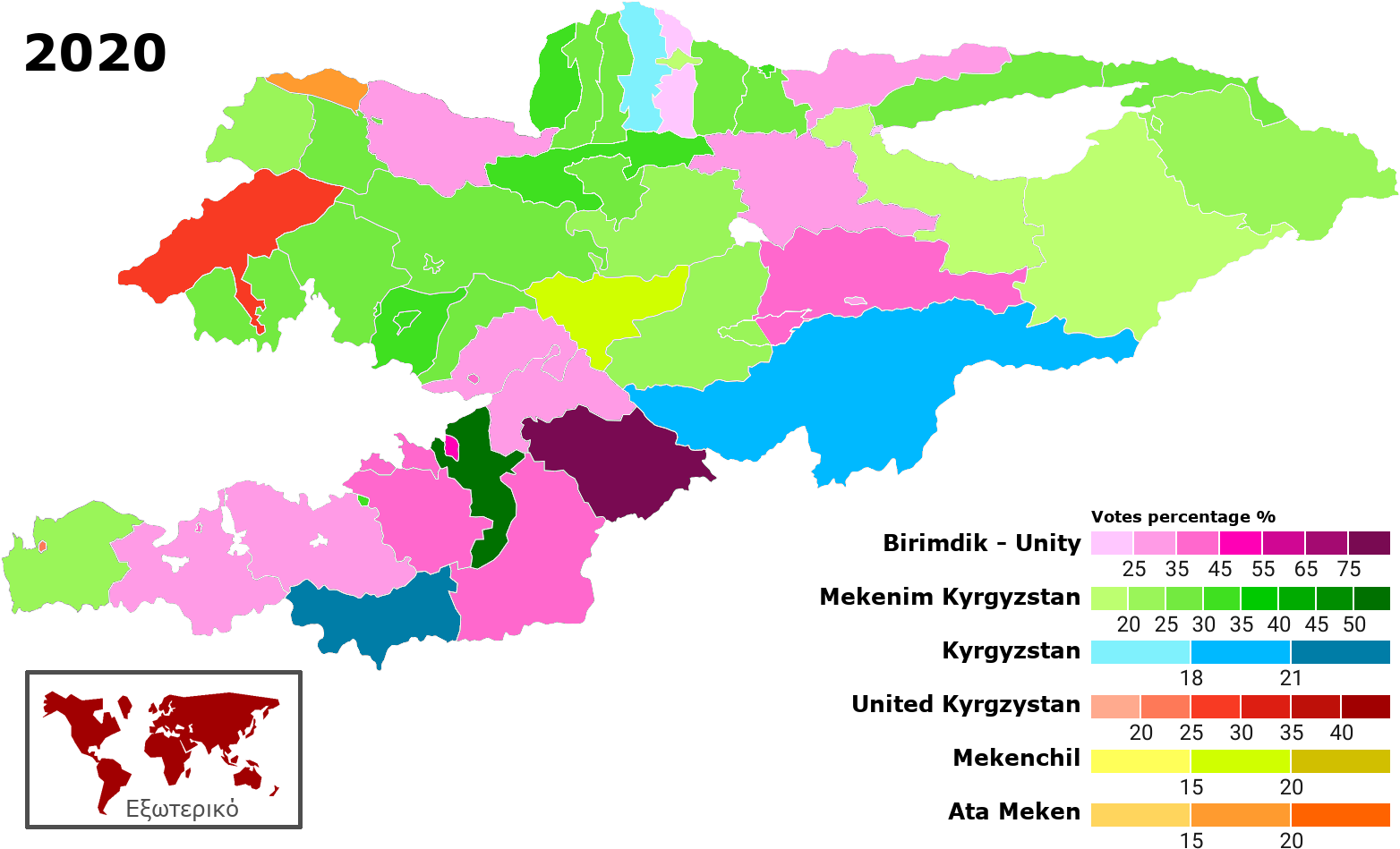
Results by region
Prime Minister before	Prime Minister after
Kubatbek Boronov; Independent	Election results annulled Sadyr Japarov becomes prime minister

Parliamentary elections were held in Kyrgyzstan on 4 October 2020. The results showed that pro-government parties had won a supermajority of seats. The election was subsequently annulled by the Central Election Commission during the 2020 Kyrgyzstan protests.

== Background ==
Due to party infighting between supporters of current President Sooronbay Jeenbekov and former President Almazbek Atambayev, the governing Social Democratic Party of Kyrgyzstan did not contest the election, and new parties split off and ran in their stead: the pro-Jeenbekov Unity, and the pro-Atambayev Social Democrats of Kyrgyzstan. Ata-Zhurt, which had previously split with the Respublika Party, partnered up with Mekenim Kyrgyzstan and both parties ran under the latter's name. The Ata Meken Socialist Party entered into a coalition called "New Breath" with the Liberal Democratic Party, New Breath Youth Association, and the Association "Green Alliance of Kyrgyzstan".

The elections took place during the COVID-19 pandemic.

== Electoral system ==
The 120 seats in the Supreme Council are elected by proportional representation in a single nationwide constituency. To win seats, parties must pass a national electoral threshold of 7% of the votes cast, and receive at least 0.7% of the vote in each of the seven regions. No one party is allowed to hold more than 65 seats. Party lists are required to have at least 30% of the candidates from each gender, and every fourth candidate had to be of a different gender. Each list is also required to have at least 15% of the candidates being from ethnic minorities and 15% of under 35 years old, as well as at least two candidates with disabilities.

== Conduct ==
Several opposition parties called on the government to postpone the election due to the COVID-19 pandemic prior to the campaign period in September.

During the elections, several parties were accused of buying votes. Several journalists also reported that they had been harassed or attacked. The costs associated with filing to run for the elections and campaigning were also criticized, with critics saying it was impossible for smaller parties without ties to an oligarch to afford.

== Results ==
Unity received a plurality of votes, beating out the Ata-Zhurt–Mekenim Kyrgyzstan alliance by under one percent, with 46 seats. Ata-Zhurt–Mekenim Kyrgyzstan received 45 seats, while other parties lagged behind. The Kyrgyzstan Party received 16 seats, while United Kyrgyzstan entered parliament for the first time with 13. Several other parties failed to meet the 7% threshold, including Ata Meken, which had been a part of every parliament since the 2010 Kyrgyz Revolution.

Out of the parties that made it into parliament, only United Kyrgyzstan consistently opposes the incumbent government led by President Jeenbekov.

Party	Votes	%	Seats	+/–
Unity	469,098	24.85	46	New
Mekenim Kyrgyzstan	452,971	24.00	45	New
Kyrgyzstan	166,861	8.84	16	–2
United Kyrgyzstan	139,736	7.40	13	+13
Mekenchil	132,807	7.04	0	New
Respublika	111,302	5.90	0	New
Ata Meken Socialist Party	78,165	4.14	0	–11
Light of Faith	64,715	3.43	0	New
Bir Bol	58,389	3.09	0	–12
Great Crusade	44,769	2.37	0	New
Zamandash	41,720	2.21	0	0
Social Democrats	41,023	2.17	0	New
Reform Party	31,788	1.68	0	New
Homeland Accord	12,021	0.64	0	New
The Centre	4,185	0.22	0	New
Party of Veterans of the Afghan War	3,288	0.17	0	New
Against all	34,512	1.83	–	–
Total	1,887,350	100.00	120	0
Valid votes	1,887,350	98.51		
Invalid/blank votes	28,607	1.49		
Total votes	1,915,957	100.00		
Registered voters/turnout	3,523,554	54.38		
Source: CEC

== Aftermath ==
The Ata Meken Socialist Party and the Social Democrats both disputed the results, and staged a brief protest in Bishkek. One other party also disputed the result. Around 4,000 people also staged a protest in Bishkek when the results were announced, with smaller protests held in two other cities. Around 16 people were injured as police attempted to disperse the crowds. A total of 12 parties also signed a document urging the government to annul the elections as a result of irregularities and hold new ones. One group protesting in Bishkek managed to free ex-President Atambayev from jail on late in the night on 5 October, where he had been serving an 11-year-and-two-month sentence for a corruption since June. Protestors also occupied the building housing the parliament and presidential administration. There were also reports that part of the parliament building was set ablaze. Protests continued throughout the day on 6 October, eventually resulting in one death and around 590 injuries. A further several hundred were injured on the following day as well as protests continued. Atambayev was re-arrested on 10 October.

Following continued protests, the results were annulled by the Central Election Commission on 6 October. Prime Minister Kubatbek Boronov and parliament speaker Dastan Jumabekov also tendered their resignation on 6 October. The parliament announced opposition figure Sadyr Zhaparov of the nationalist Patriotic party as acting Prime Minister, and Myktybek Abdyldayev as the new speaker of parliament. Zhaparov had been serving an 11-year and six-month prison sentence for taking a government official hostage in 2013 until his appointment. The mayors of Bishkek and Osh, as well as the governors of the Naryn, Talas, and Issyk-Kul regions also resigned. A group of 13 opposition parties said that they had formed the Coordinating Council of Popular Trust which would assume responsibility for formulating ideas to find a way out of the deadlock. It was later announced that Zhaparov did not have the backing of enough parties to be installed as the new PM, resulting in further confusion. Zhaparov eventually ended up being elected PM with the necessary quorum (51 MPs were present and 10 were voting by proxy) in the early hours of the morning on 11 October. President Jeenbekov vetoed the nomination on 12 October, but later accepted it after parliament voted to confirm him again on 13 October. Abdyldayev resigned as speaker on 10 October only a few days after he was appointed, with Kanatbek Isaev taking over the speakership on 13 October.

On 15 October President Jeenbekov announced that he would resign to prevent further bloodshed. His resignation will take effect should parliament approve it. It was approved on 16 October, and Prime Minister Zhaparov was installed as interim President by the parliament until new elections could be held, despite the Kyrgyz Constitution saying that the next person in the line of succession is the speaker of the parliament. Speaker Isaev had previously stated that he was not interested in the position.

New elections were tentatively scheduled for 20 December, but were later pushed back to no later than June 2021 so constitutional reform could be enacted. They were subsequently held in November 2021 following a referendum that reintroduced a presidential system.
