= Anvar Artykov =

Kyrgyz politician

Anvar Artykov Анвар Артыкович Артыков

Member of the Supreme Soviet of the Kirghiz SSR
- In office 25 February 1990 – 31 August 1991

Member of the Supreme Council of Kyrgyzstan
- Incumbent
- Assumed office 10 November 2010
- In office 31 August 1991 – 12 March 2000

Acting Governor of Osh Region
- In office 25 March 2005 – 12 December 2005

Personal details
- Born: Anvar Artykovich Artykov; November 30, 1951 (age 74) Osh, Osh Oblast, Kirgiz SSR, Soviet Union (now Kyrgyzstan)
- Party: Social Democratic Party of Kyrgyzstan
- Other political affiliations: Ar-Namys; Communist Party of the Soviet Union
- Children: 5

Anvar Artykovich Artykov (born 30 November 1951) is a Kyrgyz politician, and current member of the Supreme Council of Kyrgyzstan. Artykov served as governor of Osh Region between March and December 2005, and was previously a deputy between 1990 and 2000.

== Early life and education ==
Artykov was born on 30 November 1951 in the city of Osh in Osh Oblast in the Kirgiz SSR, now Kyrgyzstan. In 1977 he graduated from Andijan Cotton Institute with a degree in mechanical engineering. He was also a student of the Communist Party of the Soviet Union's Academy of Social Sciences between 1989 and 1991.

== Career ==
=== Pre-deputy career, 1966–1990 ===
Artykov started work in 1966, working at an office for the Kyrgyz SSR's Ministry of Housing and Communal Services. He performed his military service in the Soviet Army between 1973 and 1975, being posted to the Moscow Military District. Three years later, in 1979, Artykov became the main engineer at a motor depot in Osh, working there for two years.

Artykov's last job before becoming a deputy was as an instructor in the industrial department of the local Osh Oblast chapter of the Communist Party of the Soviet Union from 1984 to 1991.

=== First term as deputy, World Bank role, Osh Region governor, 1990–2010 ===
In 1990, Aryktov became a deputy in the Supreme Soviet of the Kirghiz SSR, and then after Kyrgyzstan's independence from the Soviet Union continued to be a deputy in the new Jogorku Kenesh until 2000. From 2004 to 2005, Artykov headed a World Bank project on energy.

==== Involvement in the Tulip Revolution ====
Artykov was part of the opposition during the Tulip Revolution in March 2005, which saw president Askar Akayev overthrown. In a 'kurultai' or congress of opposition figures, Artykov was elected as a "people's governor" of Osh Region on 19 March 2005, but was detained by the police a day later. After Akayev resigned the presidency on 24 March, Artykov was made the acting governor of the region on the 25th, and spent a little under nine months in the role, being dismissed on 12 December 2005.

=== Second term as deputy, 2010–present ===
Artykov was one of three Uzbeks elected to the Supreme Council of Kyrgyzstan (Jogorku Kenesh) in the 2010 Kyrgyz parliamentary election as part of the Ar-Namys party, which he left in April 2011 along with nine other deputies to cross the floor to the majority coalition, which at the time included the Social Democratic Party of Kyrgyzstan (SDPK), the Respublika Party and Ata-Zhurt. He served on the council's defence security committee from 2012 onwards. Artykov was reelected in the 2015 Kyrgyz parliamentary election as an SDPK deputy.

== Personal life ==
Artykov is married, and has five children. He is ethnically Uzbek.
