= Aybek Altynbekov =

Kyrgyz politician

Aybek Altynbekov Айбек Алтынбеков

Member of the Supreme Council of Kyrgyzstan
- Incumbent
- Assumed office 4 October 2015

Personal details
- Born: Aybek Altynbekov; January 12, 1978 (age 47) Köktöndü, Jalad-Abad Oblast, Kirgiz SSR, Soviet Union (now Kyrgyzstan)
- Party: Respublika–Ata Zhurt
- Children: 5

Aybek Altynbekov (born 12 January 1978) is a Kyrgyz politician, and current member of the Supreme Council of Kyrgyzstan.

== Early life and education ==
Altynbekov was born on 12 January 1978 in the village of Köktöndü in Jalad-Abad Oblast in the Kirgiz SSR, now Kyrgyzstan. In 2000 he graduated from Osh State University with a degree in jurisprudence, while also completing his service at the university's military department, leaving as a junior lieutenant.

== Career ==
=== Legal consultant and company director, 2001–2015 ===
Altynbekov started work in 2001 as a legal consultant at a company named "Jarkynay". Between 2010 and 2011 he was general director of a security agency called "Jyldyzbek" and between 2011 and 2015 he was the general director of a company called "Zolotoy Orekh" (in English means "Golden Nut").

=== Jogorku Kenesh deputy, 2015–present ===
Altynbekov was elected as deputy for the Respublika–Ata Zhurt in the 2015 parliamentary election.

== Personal life ==
Altynbekov is married, and has 4 children.

== See also ==
- List of members of the Supreme Council (Kyrgyzstan), 2015–present
