= Myktybek Abdyldayev =

Kyrgyz politician (1953–2026)

- Мыктыбек Абдылдаев

Speaker of the Supreme Council
- In office 6 October 2020 – 10 October 2020
- President: Almazbek Atambayev
- Preceded by: Dastan Jumabekov
- Succeeded by: Kanatbek Isaev

Member of the Supreme Council of Kyrgyzstan
- In office 10 November 2010 – 8 June 2026

Leader of Ata-Zhurt
- In office November 2012 – April 2014

General Prosecutor of the Kyrgyz Republic
- In office 2002 – 23 March 2005

Member of the Supreme Soviet of the Kirghiz SSR
- In office 25 February 1990 – 1990

Personal details
- Born: Myktybek Yusupovich Abdyldayev; 17 August 1953 Kara-Jygach, Chuy Oblast, Kirghiz SSR, Soviet Union
- Died: 8 June 2026 (aged 72)
- Party: Ata-Zhurt (2010–2015); Bir Bol (2015–2026)
- Children: 2
- Education: Kyrgyz State National University

Myktybek Yusupovich Abdyldayev (Kyrgyz: Мыктыбек Юсупович Абдылдаев; 17 August 1953 – 8 June 2026) was a Kyrgyz politician who was a member of the Supreme Council of Kyrgyzstan as deputy for the Bir Bol party.

== Early life and education ==
Abdyldayev was born on 17 August 1953 in the village of Kara-Jygach in Chuy Oblast in the Kirgiz SSR, now Kyrgyzstan. In 1976 he completed his degree in philology at the Kyrgyz State National University.

== Career ==
=== Komsomol and civil service career, 1976 to 1990 ===
Abdyldayev left his first job as a turner in a factory in Frunze in 1976, after five years of work and completion of studies to become secretary for the Komsomol committee in Frunze's Technical College of Soviet Trade, and then became its secretary for its committee in the Issyk-Kul Oblast between 1982 and 1983.

He rose up the ranks of the political bureaucracy, leaving his Komsomol role to become head of the political department of the Department of Internal Affairs of Issyk-Kul Oblast's executive committee between 1983 and 1986. After completing extra further education in management at the Academy of Management of Ministry of Internal Affairs of the USSR for three years, Abdyldayev was promoted to deputy of the internal affairs department in 1989.

His final role in the Soviet Union was as a deputy in the Supreme Soviet of the Kirghiz SSR, holding the position after being elected in the 1990 Kirghiz Supreme Soviet election. Although one source indicates that he did not hold this position for long, serving only until 1991 (when the Supreme Soviet became the Jogorku Kenesh), another source indicates that he was deputy until the 1995 parliamentary election.

=== Post-Soviet career, 1991 to 2026 ===
==== Internal affairs roles, 1991 to 2001 ====
Kyrgyzstan declared itself sovereign in December 1990, and independent in August 1991, with Askar Akayev as president. After independence, Abdyldayev spent the 1990s in roles in internal affairs departments – he returned to Issyk-Kul's internal affairs department as head between November 1991 to November 1994, before being recruited to serve as the Deputy Minister for the nationwide Ministry of Internal Affairs in the same month. He held the position for two and a half years before being promoted to First Deputy Minister in March 1997. He left in January 2001.

==== Akayev to Bakiyev, 2001 to 2010 ====
After leaving the post of first deputy minister for internal affairs, Abdyldayev was appointed Deputy Secretary of the Security Council of the Kyrgyz Republic and also as Director of the International Institute for Strategic Studies under the President of the Kyrgyz Republic, in February 2001. He then was made head of the Department for Defense and Security Affairs of the Presidential Administration of the Kyrgyz Republic in 2002 during Askar Akayev's presidency, and also gained the post of Prosecutor General in the same year. Akayev dismissed Abdyldayev in March 2005, for 'poor work' in dealing with the protests related to the Tulip Revolution.

After a long period of working at the regional and nationwide internal affairs departments, Abdyldayev returned once again to an internal affairs role as Acting Deputy Minister for Internal Affairs in March 2005, in the wake of the Tulip Revolution.

Abdyldayev did not return to a government role for another year, until being appointed by Akayev's successor, Kurmanbek Bakiyev, to the head of the Presidential Administration, serving for from May 2006 to April 2007, when he resigned in wake of protests calling for a fresh presidential election.

==== Jogorku Kenesh deputy, 2010 to 2026 ====
After the wake of 2010 Kyrgyz revolution, he was elected as deputy for the Ata-Zhurt party in the 2010 parliamentary elections, and was leader from November 2012 to April 2014. In 2015, he switched his affiliation to the Bir Bol party.

In April 2011, Abdyldayev was part of a procession of deputies who sacrificed rams outside the Jogorku Kenesh building, just before the morning session of the day started. It was done to stop 'evil spirits' disrupting the work of the legislature.

== Personal life and death ==
Abdyldayev was married and had two children. He died on 8 June 2026, at the age of 72.

== See also ==
- List of members of the Supreme Council (Kyrgyzstan), 2015–present
