= Aynuru Altybayeva =

Kyrgyz politician

Aynuru Altybayeva Айнуру Тойчиевна Алтыбаева

Member of the Supreme Council of Kyrgyzstan
- Incumbent
- Assumed office 10 November 2010

Personal details
- Born: Aynuru Toychiyevna Altybayeva; February 28, 1958 (age 67); Osh, Osh Oblast, Kirgiz SSR, Soviet Union (now Kyrgyzstan)
- Political party: Ar-Namys (2010–2015); Social Democratic Party of Kyrgyzstan (2015–present)
- Children: 2
- Education: Kyrgyz State University

Aynuru Toychiyevna Altybayeva (born 28 February 1958) is a Kyrgyz politician, and current member of the Supreme Council of Kyrgyzstan.

== Early life and education ==
Altybayeva was born on 28 February 1958 in the city of Osh in Osh Oblast in the Kirgiz SSR, now Kyrgyzstan. In 1979 she graduated from Kyrgyz State University with a degree in economics. She returned to the same university and received a degree in jurisprudence in 1998.

== Career ==
=== Civil service roles, regional and national, 1979–2010 ===
After graduation, Altybayeva worked in various roles in the Osh Oblast regional government for eighteen years, leaving in 1997. She moved to the country's tax collection department, working in its subdivisions for nine years, leaving in 2006. In 2007, Altybayeva worked for a year as the advisor to head of the Social Fund of the Kyrgyz Republic, and also as the deputy head of the fund's chapter at the Sverdlovsk district administration. Between 2008 and 2010 she was a consultant in the Supreme Council, and for a brief period before becoming deputy she was chairman of the public association Ayaldar Keneshi and chairman of the Birimdik political party.

=== Jogorku Kenesh deputy, 2010–present ===
Altybayeva was elected as deputy for the Ar-Namys party in the 2010 parliamentary election, and then switched allegiance to the Social Democratic Party of Kyrgyzstan in the 2015 parliamentary election.

== Personal life ==
Altybayeva is married, and has two children.

== See also ==
- List of members of the Supreme Council (Kyrgyzstan), 2015–present
