= Osmonbek Artykbayev =

Kyrgyz politician

Osmonbek Artykbayev Осмонбек Мамбетжанович Артыкбаев

Member of the Supreme Council of Kyrgyzstan
- Incumbent
- Assumed office 4 October 2015

Member of the Supreme Council of Kyrgyzstan
- In office 13 March 2005 – 2009

Personal details
- Born: Osmonbek Mambetzhanovich Arytkbayev; February 19, 1960 (age 65) Kyzyl-Uraan, Osh Oblast, Kirgiz SSR, Soviet Union (now Kyrgyzstan)
- Party: Social Democratic Party of Kyrgyzstan (2007–present)
- Children: 3
- Education: Frunze Polytechnic Institute; Kyrgyz National University

Osmonbek Mambetzhanovich Artykbayev (born 19 February 1960) is a Kyrgyz politician, and former member of the Supreme Council of Kyrgyzstan.

== Early life and education ==
Artykbayev was born on 19 February 1960 in the village of Kyzyl-Uraan in Osh Oblast in the Kirgiz SSR, now Kyrgyzstan. In 1986 he graduated from Frunze Polytechnic Institute with a degree in industrial and civilian production. He also graduated from Kyrgyz National University in 1999 as a lawyer and later obtained a PhD in economics in 2009.

== Career ==
=== Early career, 1980–1991 ===
Artykbayev served in the Soviet Army between 1978 and 1980, and started work in 1980 for the state energy firm Kirgizglavenergo. He worked at two hydroelectric plants in Naryn Oblast — Toktogul and Kurpsai dams. He left in 1982 and became a diver at Kara-Kul rescue station in September of the same year, before leaving again in February 1983 to join a factory as an electrician, where he worked until July of the same year.

Between August 1986 and November 1991 he worked as the manager of the production department at the Tash-Kumyrsky Semiconductor Materials Plant.

=== Executive and business career, 1991–2005 ===
From 1991 to 1995 Artykbayev was the director of a Karaköl-based roadbuilding company named 'Scorpion', and through 1995 to 2001 headed a joint Kyrgyz-Belarusian business venture named 'Neman'. He continued, after 2001, to head a similarly named company, 'Neman Holding', as general director, until 2004.

=== Jogorku Kenesh deputy, 2005–2009 ===
Artykbayev was first elected as deputy for the Supreme Council of Kyrgyzstan in the 2005 parliamentary election, and joined the Social Democratic Party of Kyrgyzstan in 2007. He left the chamber in 2009.

=== Government and business work, 2009–2015 ===
Between 13 April 2010 and 19 January 2011, Arytkbayev was the Minister of Energy, and between 19 January 2011 and 19 January 2012 he was chairman of the board at Kyrgyzaltyn. From 19 January 2012 to 22 May 2013 he was director for the State Inspectorate for Environmental and Technical Safety. Artykbayev then returned to a ministerial post as Minister of Energy and Industry from 22 May 2013 to 9 October 2014.

=== Second time in the Jogorku Kenesh, 2015–present ===
Artykbayev rejoined the Jogorku Kenesh after being reelected in the 2015 parliamentary election, remaining a member of the Social Democratic Party of Kyrgyzstan.

== Personal life ==
Artykbayev is married, and has three children.

== See also ==
- List of members of the Supreme Council (Kyrgyzstan), 2015–present
