= Aliyarbek Abjaliyev =

Kyrgyz politician

Aliyarbek Abjaliyev Алиярбек Токобекович Абжалиев

Member of the Supreme Council of Kyrgyzstan
- In office 27 February 2005 – 16 December 2007
- Incumbent
- Assumed office 4 October 2015

Personal details
- Born: Aliyarbek Tokobekovich Abjaliyev; November 5, 1967 (age 58) Osh, Osh Oblast, Kirgiz SSR, Soviet Union (now Kyrgyzstan)
- Party: Respublika–Ata Zhurt
- Children: 4
- Education: Kyrgyz State University; Diplomatic Academy of the Ministry of Foreign Affairs of Kyrgyzstan

Aliyarbek Tokobekovich Abjaliyev (born 5 November 1967) is a Kyrgyz politician, and current member of the Supreme Council of Kyrgyzstan.

== Early life and education ==
Abjaliyev was born on 5 November 1967 in the city of Osh in Osh Oblast in the Kirgiz SSR, now Kyrgyzstan. In 1991 he graduated from Kyrgyz State University with a degree in economics and planning of material–technical supply. He then received a degree in jurisprudence at the same university in 1996.

== Career ==
=== Accountancy, economic and customs work, 1992 to 2005 ===
Abjaliyev started work in 1992 as an accountant on a farm in Osh Region, moving to the Archa Trading House in the same year to work as an economist. He then worked between 1993 and 2000 at a customs checkpoint in the Osh area, as senior inspector, head inspector, deputy head of the whole checkpoint and then as head. He left to become a head of a checkpoint in Batken Region and worked there for four years; in 2004 he took a job at Manas Airport, Kyrgyzstan's main international airport as head of customs operations.

=== First term as Kenesh deputy, anti-monopoly agency role, 2005 to 2012 ===
Abjaliyev was first elected as deputy for the Supreme Council of Kyrgyzstan in the 2005 Kyrgyz parliamentary election, under the rule of Askar Akayev. The results of the election would later cause the Tulip Revolution. During his term as deputy, he performed further study at the Diplomatic Academy of the Ministry of Foreign Affairs of Kyrgyzstan and was a member on the budgetary and financial committee.

After leaving the Supreme Council in the 2007 Kyrgyz parliamentary election, Abjaliyev became state secretary for Kyrgyzstan's anti-monopoly watchdog.

=== Second Kenesh term, 2015 to present ===
Abjaliyev was elected as deputy for the Respublika–Ata Zhurt party in the 2015 parliamentary election.

== Personal life ==
Abjaliyev is married, and has 4 children.

== See also ==
- List of members of the Supreme Council (Kyrgyzstan), 2015–present
