= Marat Amankulov =

Kyrgyz politician (1970–2026)

- Марат Аманкулов

Member of the Supreme Council of Kyrgyzstan
- In office 28 November 2015 – 1 April 2021

Member of the Biskhek City Council
- In office 2008 – 28 November 2015

Personal details
- Born: Marat Askerovich Amankulov; 24 March 1970 Jeti-Ögüz, Issyk-Kul Oblast, Kirgiz SSR, Soviet Union (now Kyrgyzstan)
- Died: 1 January 2026 (aged 55)
- Party: Independent
- Other political affiliations: Birimdik; Social Democratic Party of Kyrgyzstan
- Children: 4
- Education: Kyrgyz State National University

Marat Askerovich Amankulov (Kyrgyz: Марат Аскерович Аманкулов; 24 March 1970 – 1 January 2026) was a Kyrgyz politician who was a member of the Supreme Council of Kyrgyzstan.

== Early life and education ==
Amankulov was born on 24 March 1970 in the village of Jeti-Ögüz in Issyk-Kul Oblast in the Kirgiz SSR, now Kyrgyzstan. In 1985 he finished his studies at Vasil'yevskiy Secondary School in Jeti-Oguz and then studied for three years at Technical College №37 in Frunze, receiving a qualification for a driver-mechanic. In 2004 he graduated from Kyrgyz State National University with a degree in jurisprudence.

== Career ==
=== Soviet Army and light industry exporter, 1988–2008 ===
Amankulov served in the Soviet Army between 1988 and 1990 as part of the Western Group of Forces in East Germany; after leaving, he started work in the same year as an exporter of light industry.

=== Bishkek City Council deputy, 2008–2015 ===
In 2008, Amankulov was elected as a deputy in the Bishkek City Council for the third Gagarinsky electoral district. During his time as deputy, he became the representative of the city's budgetary and finance committee (in 2009), became speaker of the assembly in March 2011 and was reelected in that role again, in November 2012. Also, in December 2011, Amankulov became the Chairman of the Fund for State Property Management.

=== Jogorku Kenesh deputy, 2015–2026 ===
Amankulov was elected as deputy for the Social Democratic Party of Kyrgyzstan in the 2015 parliamentary election. In September 2020, days before the October 2020 Kyrgyz parliamentary election, video footage of Amankulov making a remark that seemed to regret Kyrgyzstan's independence was leaked. Amankulov stated that "The ideology of our party is Eurasianism, and that is what we are aspiring toward", and that "thirty years of life in independence have shown us that the time has come for us to rethink and return to the fold". While Amankulov has stated that his remarks were taken out of context, they were met with condemnation, and 300 protesters held a rally in the capital Bishkek to denounce his remarks the following day.

== Personal life and death ==
Amankulov was married to Venera (maiden name unknown), who was born and raised in Bishkek and also studied economics there; her parents originate from Talas. Together they had four children.

Amankulov died on 1 January 2026, at the age of 55.

== See also ==
- List of members of the Supreme Council (Kyrgyzstan), 2015–present
