= Janarbek Akayev =

Kyrgyz politician

- Жанарбек Акаев
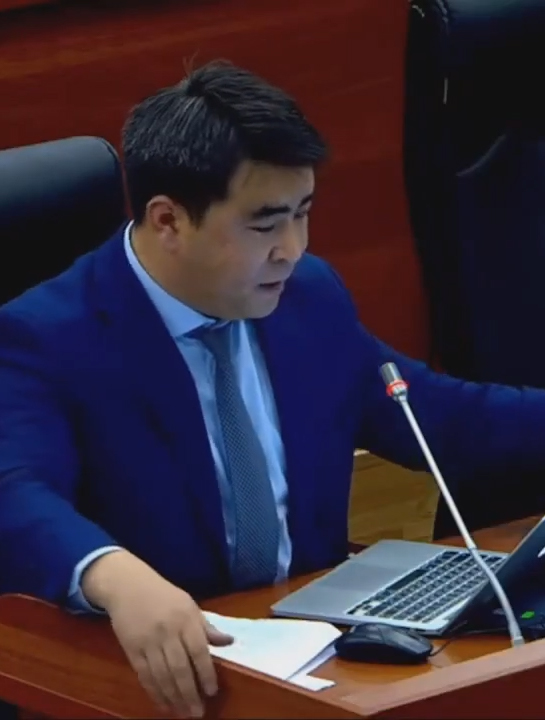
- Akayev in 2021

Member of the Supreme Council of Kyrgyzstan
- Incumbent
- Assumed office 4 October 2015

Personal details
- Born: December 13, 1986 (age 39) Kabylan-Kul, Osh Oblast, Kirghiz SSR, Soviet Union
- Party: Social Democratic Party of Kyrgyzstan (2015–2017)
- Children: 1

Janarbek Kubanychovich Akayev (Kyrgyz: Жанарбек Кубанычович Акаев; born 13 December 1986) is a Kyrgyz politician, and current member of the Supreme Council of Kyrgyzstan since 4 October 2015.

== Early life and education ==
Akayev was born on 13 December 1986 in the village of Kabylan-Kul in Osh Oblast in the Kirgiz SSR, now Kyrgyzstan. In 2009 he graduated from Osh State University with a degree in journalism.

== Career ==
=== Radio Azattyk and press secretary, 2008–2015 ===
Akayev joined the Kyrgyz chapter of Radio Free Europe/Radio Liberty, Radio Azattyk in February 2008, and between 2012 and 2013 was a correspondent for RFE/RL in Prague. For six months between February and August 2015, he was Almazbek Atambayev's press secretary.

=== Jogorku Kenesh deputy, 2015–present ===
Akayev was elected as deputy for the Social Democratic Party of Kyrgyzstan in the 2015 parliamentary election, until he was expelled from the party in March 2017.

== Personal life ==
Akayev is married, and is the father to one child.

== See also ==
- List of members of the Supreme Council (Kyrgyzstan), 2015–present
