= Salaydin Aydarov =

Kyrgyz politician

Salaydin Aydarov Салайдин Абдираевич Айдаров

Member of the Supreme Council of Kyrgyzstan
- Incumbent
- Assumed office 4 October 2015

Personal details
- Born: Salaydin Abdirayevich Aydarov; July 17, 1969 (age 56) Gulcha, Osh Oblast, Kirgiz SSR, Soviet Union (now Kyrgyzstan)
- Party: Kyrgyzstan Party
- Children: 5
- Education: Agricultural Institute named after K.I. Skryabina; Kyrgyz State University

Salaydin Abdirayevich Aydarov (born 17 July 1969) is a Kyrgyz politician and ex-civil servant, and current member of the Supreme Council of Kyrgyzstan.

== Early life and education ==
Aydarov was born on 17 July 1969 in the village of Gulcha in Osh Oblast in the Kirgiz SSR, now Kyrgyzstan. In 1992 he graduated from the Agricultural Institute named after K.I. Skryabina as an agronomist, and in 1996 he graduated from Kyrgyz State University with a degree in economics and organisation of production management.

== Career ==
Aydarov started work in 1987, watering crops on a farm, before serving for one year in the Soviet Army between 1988 and 1989. Before his election to the Jogorku Kenesh, Aydarov worked in various positions in various government agencies. He worked up the ranks of the State Customs Service, working there between 1994 and 2003, ending up as the head of the department. He then left and became head of the Staff of the Revenue Committee under the Ministry of Economy and Finance for one year before moving to become manager of the Personnel Department of the same agency, also serving for another year.

Aydarov moved back to a customs-related role between 2006 and 2007 as director of the State Customs Inspectorate and between 2009 and 17 August 2010, was First Deputy Chairman of the State Financial Intelligence Service.

=== Jogorku Kenesh deputy ===
Aydarov was elected as deputy for the Kyrgyzstan Party in the 2015 parliamentary election.

== Personal life ==
Aydarov is married, and has five children.

== See also ==
- List of members of the Supreme Council (Kyrgyzstan), 2015–present
