= Mukhtarbek Aynakulov =

Kyrgyz actor, director and politician

Mukhtarbek Ainakulov Мухтарбек Айнакулович Айнакулов

Member of the Supreme Council of Kyrgyzstan
- Incumbent
- Assumed office 4 October 2015

Personal details
- Born: Mukhtarbek Aynakulovich Aynakulov; November 13, 1957 (age 68) Sosnovka, Chuy Oblast, Kirgiz SSR, Soviet Union (now Kyrgyzstan)
- Party: Social Democratic Party of Kyrgyzstan
- Children: 2
- Education: Gerasimov Institute of Cinematography; Russian Academy of Theatre Arts

Mukhtarbek Aynakulovich Aynakulov (born 13 November 1957) is a Kyrgyz actor, director and politician. He is a current member of the Supreme Council of Kyrgyzstan for the Social Democratic Party of Kyrgyzstan.

== Early life and education ==
Aynakulov was born on 13 November 1957 in the village of Sosnovka in Chuy Oblast in the Kirgiz SSR, now Kyrgyzstan. In 1981 he graduated from the Gerasimov Institute of Cinematography, and then in 1983 he graduated from the Russian Academy of Theatre Arts with a qualification in acting and directing.

== Career ==
=== Acting career ===
He started his career in 1983 at a theatre in the town of Przheval'sk, now known as Karakol. From 2007 until 2014, he worked in various acting studios in Bishkek, such as working as a director in "Studiya-Bishkek" and "PP Service CEZ Biskhek", before working as a leading specialist at "PP Sakchi CEZ Bishkek" for a year until his election.

=== Jogorku Kenesh deputy ===
Aynakulov was elected as deputy for the Social Democratic Party of Kyrgyzstan in the 2015 parliamentary election.

In May 2017, he was seen campaigning against the presence of independent election observers from overseeing the 2017 presidential election. Aynakulov stated that his reason for supporting such a restriction was "because they are funded by foreign donors and can influence the result of elections".

== Personal life ==
Aynakulov is married, and has 2 children.

== See also ==
- List of members of the Supreme Council (Kyrgyzstan), 2015–present
