= Erkingul Imankozhoeva =

Kyrgyzstani environmental activist and politician

Erkingul Bekbachaevna Imankozhoeva is an environmental activist and politician from Kyrgyzstan.

== Early life ==
Erkingul Imankozhoeva was born on 19 October 1966 in the Jeti-Ögüz District of Issyk-Kul Region. For higher studies, she went to Uzbekistan and attended the Tashkent Institute of Textile and Light Industry.

== Career ==
After completing her studies, Imankozhoeva took up a job at a textile factory in Bishkek, where she was made a chief engineer in 1991. In 1998, people living near the Kumtor Gold Mine were badly affected after a truck carrying sodium cyanide fell into a river. Disheartened by the government's response Imankozhoeva formed Karek, an environmental organisation with the help of local people and after a long legal battle, they succeeded in obtaining US$3.7 million as compensation. Flowers of Freedom, a documentary created by Mirjam Leuze on this event was showcased at the Berlin International Film Festival.

Imankozhoeva won the 2010 Kyrgyz parliamentary election as a member of the Social Democratic Party and was elected to the Supreme Council of Kyrgyzstan. She served on the house's committee on Agrarian Policy, Water Resources, Ecology and Local Self-Government.

== Personal life ==
Imankozhoeva is married with two children.
