= Almasbek Akmatov =

Kyrgyz politician

Almasbek Akmatov Алмасбек Жумабекович Акматов

Member of the Supreme Council of Kyrgyzstan
- Incumbent
- Assumed office 4 October 2015

Personal details
- Born: Almasbek Jumabekovich Akmatov; October 18, 1964 (age 61) Naryn Oblast, Kirgiz SSR, Soviet Union (now Kyrgyzstan)
- Party: Bir Bol
- Children: 5
- Education: Novosibirsk Higher Military-Political Combined Arms School; Academy of Management under the President of the Kyrgyz Republic; Diplomatic Academy of the Ministry of Foreign Affairs of the Kyrgyz Republic; Kyrgyz State National University named after J.Balasagyn

Almasbek Jumabekovich Akmatov (born 18 October 1964) is a Kyrgyz politician, and current member of the Supreme Council of Kyrgyzstan.

== Early life and education ==
Akmatov was born on 18 October 1964 in Naryn Oblast in the Kirgiz SSR, now Kyrgyzstan. In 1986 he graduated from Novosibirsk Higher Military-Political Combined Arms School. In 2002, he received a degree in management at the Academy of Management under the President of the Kyrgyz Republic. In 2008 he attended his third university, the Diplomatic Academy of the Ministry of Foreign Affairs of the Kyrgyz Republic, receiving a degree in international economic relations. His fourth degree came in 2011 at the Kyrgyz State National University named after J. Balasagyn, with a degree in finance and credit.

== Career ==
=== Soviet Army and Torugart Transit, 1987 to 2001 ===
Akmatov started work in 1986 in the Soviet Army, serving various positions as political commissar. He left in 1991 to join the joint Kyrgyz-Chinese company Torugart-Transit as general director, working there for ten years.

=== Civil service career, 2001–2012 ===
After leaving his job at the transit company, Akmatov joined the Main Directorate for the Protection and Regulation of the Use of Hunting Resources as head of the agency. Although his parliamentary record states that he served there until 2002, another source states that he was head until January 2003. His next job after being head of the directorate was as the deputy administrator for the Kyrgyz president of the time, Askar Akayev, serving until August 2004; he then became his main administrator in 2005, despite being initially dismissed from his original role as deputy on allegations of corruption, specifically, extorting bribes. Akmatov sued for his "protection of honor and dignity", and then the case was subsequently dropped. There is again conflict between his parliamentary record and another source – the parliamentary record states that he held his post until 2006, while the other source states that he served between 14 April 2005 to 21 November 2005.

Between 2007 and 2015, Akmatov was the head of the territorial division of the Accounting Chamber of the Kyrgyz Republic, dealing with the finances of Bishkek city and the Chuy and Talas regions.

=== Jogorku Kenesh deputy, 2015–present ===
Akmatov was elected as deputy for the Bir Bol in the 2015 parliamentary election.

== Personal life ==
Akmatov is married and has five children.

== See also ==
- List of members of the Supreme Council (Kyrgyzstan), 2015–present
