= Azamat Arapbayev =

Kyrgyz politician

Azamat Arapbayev Азамат Абдуллажанович Арапбаев

Member of the Supreme Council of Kyrgyzstan
- Incumbent
- Assumed office 2008

Personal details
- Born: Azamat Abdullazhanovich Arapbayev; October 1, 1970 (age 55) Jalal-Abad, Osh Oblast, Kirgiz SSR, Soviet Union (now Kyrgyzstan)
- Party: Social Democratic Party of Kyrgyzstan
- Children: 4

Azamat Abdullazhanovich Arapbayev (born 1 October 1970) is a Kyrgyz politician, and current member of the Supreme Council of Kyrgyzstan.

== Early life and education ==
Arapbayev was born on 1 October 1970 in the city of Jalal-Abad in Osh Oblast in the Kirgiz SSR, now Kyrgyzstan. In 1993 he graduated from Kyrgyz Agricultural Institute named after K.I. Skryabina with a degree in hydraulic engineering. In 2004 he then completed a degree at the Diplomatic Academy of the Ministry of Foreign Affairs of the Kyrgyz Republic in international relations.

== Career ==
=== Business career and regional politician, 1993–2008 ===
Arapbayev started work as a deputy director in 1993, as the deputy director of "Osh-Intur", a tourism company. After leaving in 1996, Arapbayev spent the next four years performing the same role in two other companies: the Kyrgyz chapter of Malabar Trading Ltd. between 1996 and 1999, and from 1999 to 2000 at "Talas-Osh".

He was then elected in 2000 to the legislature of Osh Region, serving for five years; between this period he was director of "Osh Aragy" (2000–2002, although his parliamentary record states 2002–2003), chairman of the board at "Altyn-Suu" (2003–2004), general director of "Dannur-Yug", a brickmaker, (2004–2008), and on the year of leaving the legislature, joined as general director of cement-making company "Southern Combine of Building Materials" (2005–2008). Between 2007 and 2008 he was also a deputy in the Osh city legislature.

=== Jogorku Kenesh deputy, 2008–present ===
Arapbayev was elected as deputy for the Supreme Council of Kyrgyzstan in 2008. During his time he served as the chairman of the fuel and energy affairs committee between 2010 and 2012, member of the committee for constitutional legislation, state structure and human rights between 2012 and 2015 and is currently member of the committee for economic and fiscal policy.

== Personal life ==
Arapbayev is married, and has four children. He speaks Kyrgyz, Russian, Turkish and English.

== See also ==
- List of members of the Supreme Council (Kyrgyzstan), 2015–present
