= Onuguu–Progress =

Önügüü–Progress Өнүгүү-Прогресс
- Leader: Bakyt Torobayev
- Founded: 2012
- Split from: Respublika
- Headquarters: Bishkek, Kyrgyzstan
- Ideology: Agrarianism; Social conservatism Regionalism; Pro-Western
- Political position: Centre to centre-right
- Colours: Green
- Seats in the Supreme Council of Kyrgyzstan: 0 / 120

Önügüü–Progress (Kyrgyz: Өнүгүү-Прогресс, lit. 'Development–Progress') is a political party in Kyrgyzstan led by Bakyt Torobayev.

== History ==
Önügüü–Progress was formed in 2012 by Torobayev after he left Respublika, and primarily draws its support from southern Kyrgyzstan, where there is a significant Uzbek population. In December 2013 the Uluttar Birimdigi party merged into it.

In the 2015 parliamentary elections the party received 9% of the vote, winning 13 seats in the Supreme Council. It nominated Bakyt Torobayev as its candidate for the 2017 presidential elections, but he withdrew from the contest on 6 October. In October 2017 three of its MPs were expelled from the party, leaving it with ten seats. It did not contest the 2020 or 2021 parliamentary elections, nor nominate a candidate for the 2021 presidential elections.

== Ideology and views ==
In terms of its place on the ideological and political spectrum, Önügüü–Progress is a centrist party. The party advocates private property, a market economy and the development of political, party and economic competition.

The main basic ideology of the party is neo-conservatism. The party elite of the Önügüü–Progress Party prioritises the rejection of revolutionary methods of solving political problems, support for the stability of the established social and economic rules of the game, commitment to patriotic values, recognition of the role of traditional confessions in the public life of Kyrgyz citizens, support for family values and the desire to preserve and pass on traditions. At the same time, national traditions should not become an obstacle to the development of innovation in the social and economic life of society.

The party considers the preservation of traditional public morality as a priority issue and emphasises the basic functions of the state, such as defence, security and the rule of law.

The party recognises the need for state intervention in the management of society and the economy, but this intervention should be limited and regulatory in nature.

In foreign policy the party prioritises the strengthening and development of traditional foreign policy relations.
