= State Committee for National Security (Kyrgyzstan) =

Kyrgyzstan national intelligence agency

State Committee for National Security (UKMK)
- Улуттук коопсуздук боюнча мамлекеттик комитети (Kyrgyz); Государственный комитет национальной безопасности (Russian)
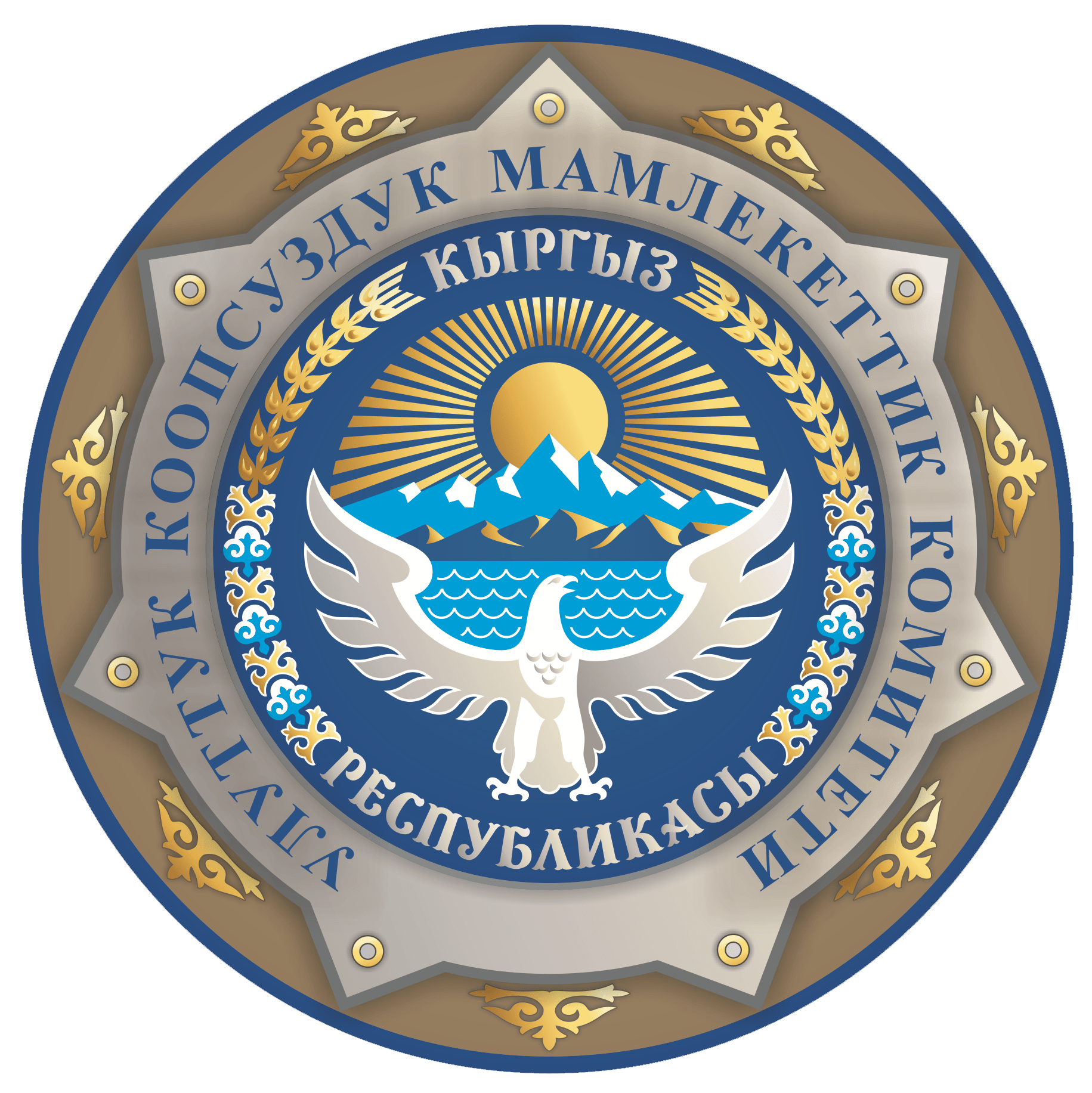

Intelligence and security agency overview
- Formed: 20 November 1993 (original agency); 12 April 2007 (current form)
- Preceding agencies: KGB of the USSR; KGB of the Kyrgyz SSR
- Jurisdiction: President of Kyrgyzstan
- Headquarters: 70 Erkindik Street, Bishkek, Kyrgyzstan
- Annual budget: Classified information
- Intelligence and security agency executive: Zhumgalbek Shabdanbekov, Chairman
- Website: gknb.gov.kg

The State Committee for National Security (SCNS-KR) (Note: Kyrgyz: Улуттук коопсуздук боюнча мамлекеттик комитети (УKMK), romanized: Uluttuk koopsuzduk boiuncha mamlekettik komiteti (UKMK); Russian: Государственный комитет национальной безопасности (ГКНБ), romanized: Gosudarstvennyy komitet natsionalnoy bezopasnosti (GKNB)) is the national intelligence and security agency responsible for counterintelligence and intelligence gathering on counterterrorism and organised crimes in Kyrgyzstan.

In carrying out this task, it carries out both preventive and investigative measures against organized terrorism and crime. The chairman of the UKMK is a military officer and a member of the Security Council of Kyrgyzstan. It is currently based on 70 Erkindik Street, Bishkek.

== Official tasks ==
The activities of the UKMK include:

- Conducting counterintelligence
- Gathering intelligence on terrorist organizations, drug traffickers, and analyzing national security information (including conducting secrecy (covert) action)
- Securing information
- Suppress the activities of harmful organizations
- Uncovering espionage and corrupt activities
- Extraction and deliver secret information related to organized criminal and terrorist groups
- Carry out the protection of the state border
- Carry out the protection of economic and legal interests in Kyrgyzstan
- Encrypted communication systems for government institutions
- Seizing any type of illegal activities and organizations
- Disarming and securing corrupted systems and people who messed with it

== History ==
=== Predecessors ===
The history of the modern Kyrgyz intelligence services dates back to December 1917, when the communist All-Russian Emergency Commission (VChK) was formed. A year later, on the Pishpek district investigation commission was established. After national delimitation occurred in the early 1920s, Regional State Political Directorate of the Kara-Kyrgyz Autonomous Oblast was created. Later on the Committee for State Security (KGB) of the Kyrgyz SSR was formed, which served as the republican affiliate for the national KGB agency.

=== Independent era ===
On 20 November 1991, President Askar Akayev signed a presidential decree establishing the UKMK. Since 2007 after the Tulip Revolution, the State Committee for National Security has been operating in its current form.

On February 6, 2007, the National Security Service became the State Committee for National Security.

In August 2002, the State Border Guard Service was established as a part of the UKMK, having been merged with the Main Border Guard Directorate of the Ministry of Defense and the Main Directorate of Border Control of the UKMK that day. This was done to have a more centralised intelligence system in Kyrgyzstan. In the years that followed, the UKMK would have little influence on the border guard service until it was finally removed from the National Security Committee on 4 September 2012, it was and was re-established as an independent department in the government.

=== Tashiev era ===
In May 2025, the State Committee for National Security announced a nationwide campaign titled Operation Illegal, scheduled to begin on 10 June 2025. The initiative was introduced amid a surge in foreign arrivals and growing concerns over undocumented migration. GKNB Chairman Kamchibek Tashiev reported that, since the beginning of the year, over 100,000 foreigners had entered Kyrgyzstan for tourism, education, work, or other purposes, with an estimated 5,000 residing in the country illegally. Tashiev highlighted that the country's simplified entry procedures were being misused, with some individuals overstaying visas or engaging in unauthorized employment. The operation, involving coordinated efforts with other law enforcement agencies, aims to identify and deport undocumented migrants through mass checks and raids. Authorities warned that foreign nationals must verify their legal status by the launch date or face removal, with the government allocating 280 million soms to support enforcement and deportation measures.

On 10 February 2026, President Sadyr Japarov signed an order on the establishment of the State Security Service on the basis of the 9th Service of the GKNB and the removal of the State Border Guard Service from the GKNB and its transfer to the Security Council of Kyrgyzstan. This was part of a broader shift in the GKNB following the removal of Tashiev as its chairman and Deputy Chairman of the Cabinet of Ministers.

== Special Forces ==
The UKMK controls the Alpha anti-terrorist unit, which like all former Soviet countries refers to a top-secret special forces unit. The unit helps deliver on the tasks listed above. In August 2010, fighters of the unit went on strike in protest against the arrest of their former chief Almaz Dzholdoshaliyev. They appealed to President Roza Otunbayeva with a demand to change the measure of restraint for the detained UKMK officers. In response, the Prosecutor General's Office opened criminal cases against nine employees of the unit, accusing them of shooting at demonstrators during the Kyrgyz Revolution of 2010.

== Criticisms ==
=== Political repression ===
Following his party's success in the 2010 Kyrgyz parliamentary election, on 23 October, the home of Kamchybek Tashiev was burglarized. He later stated to Al Jazeera that "they broke in like bandits" and "tried to eliminate me", adding that "for sure, GSNB [security services] was behind these actions." Tashiev later became Chairman of the UKMK.

== Chairman ==
- Anarbek Bakayev (November 1992 - April 1997) (Note: March 1996 - April 1997 - Minister of National Security of the Kyrgyz Republic)
- Felix Kulov (April 1997 - April 1998)
- Misir Ashirkulov (April 1998-1999)
- Tashtemir Aitbaev (1999 – 2000)
- Bolot Dzhanuzakov (2001–2002)
- Kalyk Imankulov (January 18, 2002 - March 26, 2005)
- Tashtemir Aitbaev (March 30, 2005 – May 10, 2006)
- Busurmankul Tabaldiev (May 10, 2006 - September 2006)
- Murat Sutalinov (October 6, 2006 - April 7, 2010)
- Keneshbek Duishebaev (April 7, 2010 – December 5, 2011)
- Shamil Atakhanov (December 5, 2011 - October 29, 2012)
- Beishenbay Zhunusov (October 29, 2012 - June 5, 2013)
- Busurmankul Tabaldiev (June 5, 2013 – November 5, 2015)
- Abdil Segizbaev (November 5, 2015 - April 7, 2018)
- Idris Kadyrkulov (20 April 2018 – 15 May 2019)
- Orozbek Opumbayev (June 2019 – 9 October 2020)
- Kamchybek Tashiev (16 October 2020 - 10 February 2026)
- Zhumgalbek Shabdanbekov (since 10 February 2026)

== Awards ==
Since its establishment, the UKMK has sported many commemorative awards such as the following:

- Breastplate "70 years of the Chief Directorate of the National Security Committee of the Kyrgyz Republic in the city of Bishkek"
- Breastplate "Mildet" (means "Order" or "Duty")
- Medal "100 years of Kyrgyz security services"

== Related security services in foreign countries ==
- Russia – Federal Security Service of the Russian Federation
- United States – National Security Agency and Federal Bureau of Investigation
- Israel – Shin Bet
- Ukraine – Security Service of Ukraine
- Belarus – State Security Committee of the Republic of Belarus
- Kazakhstan – National Security Committee of the Republic of Kazakhstan
- France – General Directorate for Internal Security and Directorate-General for External Security

== See also ==
- Law enforcement in Kyrgyzstan
- Ministry of Internal Affairs
- Armed Forces of Kyrgyzstan
- Ministry of Emergency Situations (Kyrgyzstan)
- List of intelligence agencies
- Alpha Group
