= Party of Communists of Kyrgyzstan =

Communist party in Kyrgyzstan

- Kyrgyz name: Кыргызстан Коммунисттеринин Партиясы
- Russian name: Партия коммунистов Кыргызстана
- Abbreviation: ПКК (Russian); PKK (transliteration)
- Leader: Iskhak Masaliyev
- Chairman: Bumairam Mamaseitova
- Founder: Absamat Masaliyev
- Founded: 22 June 1992
- Preceded by: Communist Party of Kirghizia
- Headquarters: Bishkek, Kyrgyzstan
- Newspaper: Pravda Kyrgyzstana
- Ideology: Communism; Marxism–Leninism
- Political position: Far-left
- National affiliation: United Kyrgyzstan
- International affiliation: IMCWP; World Anti-Imperialist Platform
- Continental affiliation: UCP–CPSU
- Supreme Council: 0 / 90

Party flag

Website
- pkk.kg

The Party of Communists of Kyrgyzstan (Note: Kyrgyz: Кыргызстан Коммунисттеринин Партиясы, Kyrgyzstan Kommunistterinin Partiyasy; Russian: Партия коммунистов Кыргызстана, Partiya Kommunistov Kirgizii, abbr. PKK) is a Marxist-Leninist party in Kyrgyzstan, founded on 22 June 1992. It publishes the daily newspaper Pravda Kyrgyzstana (Russian: Правда Кыргызстана, lit. 'Truth of Kyrgyzstan'). The party considers itself to be the successor of the Communist Party of Kirghizia, which ruled Kyrgyzstan during the Soviet era. The current Chairman of the Central Committee of the Communist Party of Kyrgyzstan is Masaliev Ishak Absamatovich.

== History ==
Office of the Kyrgyz Communist Party Osh regional and city committees. 2026

It was the largest political party in the Legislative Assembly of Kyrgyzstan between 2001 and 2005, with 15 of the 60 seats. In the 2005 parliamentary election it won one of the 75 seats. Two years later, the party took eight seats in the larger 90-seat Supreme Council. However, the party failed to win any seats in successive legislative elections held in 2010 and 2015. In the 2020 parliamentary election, party leader Iskhak Masaliyev ran on the United Kyrgyzstan list.

The party was formerly led by Absamat Masaliyev, a former leader of the Kirghiz SSR during the Soviet era, until his death in 2004. The party's current chairman is Bumairam Mamaseitova.

== Election results ==
Year	Votes	%	Total seats	+/–	Position
1995		2.9	3 / 105	New	6th
2000	454,589	29.33	6 / 105	▲3	2nd
2005			3 / 75	▼3	3rd
2007	140,258	6.95	8 / 90	▲5	3rd
2010	7,818	0.48	0 / 120	▼8	17th
2015	—N/a	—N/a	0 / 120	—N/a	—N/a
2020	—N/a	—N/a	0 / 120	—N/a	—N/a
2021	—N/a	—N/a	0 / 90	—N/a	—N/a
2025	—N/a	—N/a	0 / 90	—N/a	—N/a
