= Daniyar Attokurov =

Kyrgyzstani politician

Daniyar Attokurov is a Kyrgyzstani politician, the head of the national headquarters of the Social Democratic Party of Kyrgyzstan. He is a member of the Kyrgyzstan parliament.
