= 2010 Kyrgyz constitutional referendum =

Referendum that made Kyrgyzstan a parliamentary republic

- 27 June 2010
- Adoption of the Constitution of the Republic of Kyrgyzstan and Law of the Republic of Kyrgyzstan 'Establishment of the Constitution of the Republic of Kyrgyzstan', which have been submitted by the Provisional Government as drafts of the referendum.

Results
Choice	Votes	%
Yes	1,777,339	91.82%
No	158,373	8.18%
Valid votes	1,935,712	98.62%
Invalid or blank votes	27,092	1.38%
Total votes	1,962,804	100.00%
Registered voters/turnout	2,716,687	72.25%

A constitutional referendum was held in Kyrgyzstan on 27 June 2010 to reduce presidential powers and strengthen democracy in the wake of the riots earlier in the year. Parliamentary elections followed on 10 October 2010.

== Background ==
Following the ousting of Kurmanbek Bakiyev, the interim administration of Roza Otunbayeva called for a referendum to decrease presidential powers. The proposed constitution would make Kyrgyzstan Central Asia's first parliamentary republic.

In the weeks before the election ethnic unrest in the south of the country (Bakiyev's home region) in the cities of Osh and Jalal-Abad between minority Uzbeks and indigenous Kyrgyz curfew was imposed in a clampdown by Bishkek. Some refugees returned from camps in Uzbekistan amid a humanitarian crisis. The curfew was lifted for the elections. In Bishkek, the situation was reportedly "calm, with people displaying a mixture of skepticism and hope that the vote would create a new future for Kyrgyzstan."

The vote came amid international fears over the stability of the country.

The interim government's deputy leader Omurbek Tekebayev responded to this criticism saying the foreign intelligence bureaus imply that the parliamentary democracy envisioned in the referendum was incompatible with Kyrgyzstan. "Some top officials from different states have spoken about a possible Afghanization of Kyrgyzstan, about a break-up of the state. I mean the statements by President Dmitry Medvedev and others. They may have been misinformed, that they blindly believe the officials from their special services who have long been at the service of the local oligarchs."

== Constitutional changes ==
The new constitution would make Kyrgyzstan a parliamentary democracy, moving it away from a presidential system. The presidency would become a mostly ceremonial position, with officeholders serving a single term. The president would have the right to veto legislation, but would not be able to dissolve parliament. Otunbayeva would also continue to hold the office of "President of the transitional period" until the end of 2011.

The Supreme Council would be unicameral and have 120 seats, with no party able to hold more than 65. Political parties based on religion or ethnicity would be banned, whilst Russian would replace Uzbek as the country's second official language. Constitutional amendments would require a two-thirds majority in the Supreme Council. The Supreme Council would also choose the Prime Minister and play a key role in forming the new government.

== Results ==
The result was a resounding "Yes," with more than 90 percent of voters supporting the amendment to the constitution. Voter turnout was 72%. The result, however, did not include many of the 400,000 ethnic Uzbeks who had left during recent ethnic clashes since they were residing in Uzbekistan at the time of the elections.

Choice	Votes	%
For	1,777,339	91.82
Against	158,373	8.18
Total	1,935,712	100.00
Valid votes	1,935,712	98.62
Invalid/blank votes	27,092	1.38
Total votes	1,962,804	100.00
Registered voters/turnout	2,716,687	72.25
Source: Direct Democracy

=== Reactions ===
President of Russia Dmitry Medvedev said the result might lead to a "collapse of the state" as "eventually, won't it enable the political parties, which have extremist direction, to receive the power?". The U.S. Department of State praised the referendum and called upon the provisional government and people of Kyrgyzstan to "advance the process of reconciliation and accountability to ensure future interethnic harmony and move Kyrgyzstan forward on the path toward stability, security, democracy and prosperity for all citizens of the republic."

== Aftermath ==
Following the legislative election, with an expanded and further empowered parliament, the pro-Baikiyev Ata-Zhurt party won a plurality with 15.41% of the votes as it advocated rolling back the new laws and bringing the former president back from exile.
