= Roman Shin =

Kyrgyzstani politician (born 1948)

Roman Alexandrovich Shin (Russian: Роман Александрович Шин; born September 12, 1948) is a deputy in the Jogorku Kenesh, the parliament of Kyrgyzstan, and a member of the Ata-Zhurt party. He is member of the minority Korean ethnic group. Roman Shin has been a Member of Parliament since 2005. Since his reelection to the Jogorku Kenesh in 2010, he sits as a member of Ata-Zhurt (Fatherland) in that body.

He was born on September 12, 1948 in Ushtobe, Almaty Region, Kazakh SSR, Soviet Union.
