= Abdoujapar Tagaev =

Minister of Communications
- In office 1995–1996

Personal details
- Born: 31 March 1953 Uzgen District, Kirghiz SSR, USSR, (now Kyrgyzstan)
- Died: January 12, 2017 (aged 63)
- Party: Social Democratic Party of Kyrgyzstan

Abdoujapar Tagaev (Kyrgyz: Абдужапар Тагаев; Russian: Абдыжапар Абдыкаарович Тагаев, Abdyjapar Abdykaarovich Tagaev; 31 March 1953 in Uzgen District – 12 January 2017) was a Kyrgyz politician who served as Minister of Communications from 1995 to 1996. Also he headed the Jalal-Abad Region.

In 1993, he was among the founders of the Social Democratic Party of Kyrgyzstan.

== Awards and honours ==
- Manas-1000
- Honoured Worker of Kyrgyz telecommunications
- Certificate of Honour of the Kyrgyz Republic
