= Kamchybek Tashiev =

Kyrgyzstani politician (born 1968)

Hero of the Kyrgyz Republic Kamchybek Tashiev
- Камчыбек Ташиев
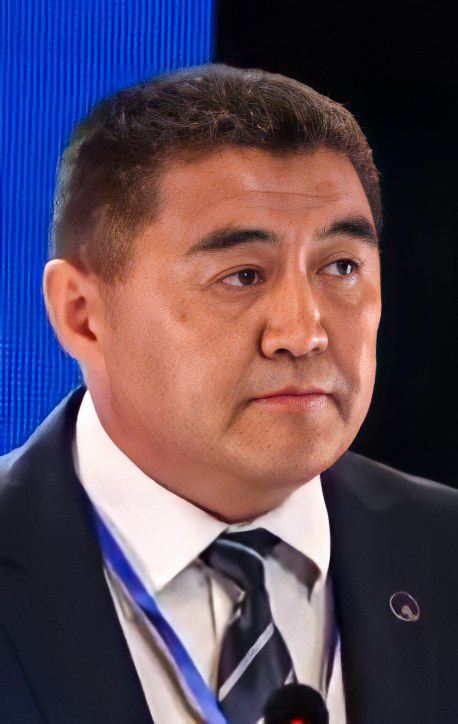
- Tashiev in 2017

Deputy Chairman of the Cabinet of Ministers of the Kyrgyz Republic
- In office 5 May 2021 – 10 February 2026
- President: Sadyr Japarov

Chairman of the State Committee for National Security
- In office 16 October 2020 – 10 February 2026
- President: Sadyr Japarov
- Preceded by: Orozbek Opumbaev
- Succeeded by: Zhumgalbek Shabdanbekov

Minister of Emergency Situations
- In office 2007–2009
- President: Kurmanbek Bakiyev

Member of the Supreme Council
- In office 2010–2013

Personal details
- Born: 27 September 1968 (age 58) Barpy, Kirghiz SSR, Soviet Union
- Party: Mekenchil
- Other political affiliations: Respublika–Ata Zhurt

Military service
- Branch/service: Soviet Army; State Committee for National Security
- Years of service: 1987–1989; 2020–present
- Rank: Colonel General

Kamchybek Kydyrsha uulu Tashiev (Kyrgyz: Камчыбек Кыдырша уулу Ташиев; born 27 September 1968) is a Kyrgyz politician who was head of the political party Ata-Zhurt until its merger with the Respublika party in 2014. Tashiev is most notable for being the Chairman of the State Committee for National Security (GKNB) and the Kyrgyz Football Union from 2020 until 10 February 2026.

Characterized as the second most powerful politician in Kyrgyzstan and even later as de facto co-ruler, Tashiev formed a decade-long political alliance with authoritarian ruler Sadyr Japarov. However, Tashiev was dismissed as Chairman of the GKNB in February 2026 while seeking medical treatment in Germany, and was in April 2026 charged with abuse of office and the violent seizure of power by the Sadyr Japarov regime. This came in the aftermath of an appeal by influential Kyrgyz politicians to Japarov to hold early presidential elections.

== Early life and education ==
He was born on 27 September 1968 in Barpy, a village in the Kirghiz SSR (a republic of the Soviet Union). From 1987 to 1989 he served in the Soviet Army. In 1992, Tashiev graduated from Tomsk State University with a degree in chemical engineering. In 1999 he graduated from Kyrgyz National University with a degree in law.

== Political career ==
Following his party's success in the 2010 Kyrgyz parliamentary election, on 23 October, Tashiev's home was burgled. He later stated to Al Jazeera that "they broke in like bandits... I think they intended to shoot me. I believe they tried to eliminate me - the forces that want to cancel election results and impose a state of emergency. I know for sure, GSNB [security services] was behind these actions." He accused Keneshbek Duishebaev, head of the GKNB in the cabinet of transitional president Roza Otunbayeva, of attacking him. Duishebaev and Roza Otunbayeva declined all accusations.

=== In government ===
In 2007, he was appointed Minister of Emergency Situations. In 2009, he resigned due to disagreements with Prime Minister Daniar Usenov. From 2010 to 2013 he was a deputy of the Jogorku Kenesh.

On 16 October 2020 he was appointed chairman of the State Committee for National Security.

=== Connections with Kurmanbek Bakiyev ===
Tashiev had repeatedly stated that he would return Kurmanbek Bakiyev to Kyrgyzstan. Kamchybek Tashiev and Kurmanbek Bakiyev come from the same village - Barpy in the Jalal-Abad region of Kyrgyzstan.

== Controversies ==
=== Kempir-Abad Case and repression of the opposition ===
Kamchybek Tashiev became one of the lobbyists in the transfer of the Kempir-Abad reservoir to the possession of Uzbekistan, the preparation of the agreement was carried out in complete secrecy and aroused the suspicions of the public. At a public hearing, Kamchybek Tashiev made a series of threats against politicians, promising to tear their mouths. “I have already registered five or six people. After (Tashiev did not specify, after what) I will hit one or two in the teeth”, - he said with a smile.

Soon after that, more than 36 political activists were arrested in February 2023. The arrests caused massive indignation on the part of the human rights and international community. The arrests were condemned by human rights organizations such as Human Rights Watch, International Partnership for Human Rights, the Norwegian Helsinki Committee, and others. Activists stated that they were intimidated at meetings with authorities on border issues. Most of the nearly 30 arrested people are still in detention.

During the discussion of the issue in parliament, Tashiev personally threatened to imprison and break the arm of the leader of the opposition Butun Kyrgyzstan faction, Adakhan Madumarov, and also cursed and insulted the mother of deputy Omurbek Bakirov. Omurbek Bakirov, after a dispute with the head of the State Committee for National Security, Kamchybek Tashiev, was deprived of his mandate.

=== Accusations of fascism ===
In 2012 as Member of Kyrgyz Parliament, he was remembered for a number of ambiguous statements, where he demanded purebredness of politicians:

"pure-blooded Kyrgyz should rule Kyrgyzstan, without admixtures of other bloodlines. We always followed others: Jews, Tatars, Russians. Babanov came to power, now we are hanging out with the Kurds"".

In particular, he criticized his main political opponent Omurbek Babanov, whose mother was Kurdish. On February 13, 2012, the Civic Anti-Fascist and Anti-Nationalist Committee (CAAC) of Kyrgyzstan issued an appeal in which it drew the attention of the public of the republic to the statements of MP Kamchibek Tashiev, who, according to CAAC, “leads purposeful propaganda of nationalism" and "voices frankly fascist ideas, raising the question of the purebredness of this or that politician." Kyrgyzstan is an multiethnic state and such statements were regarded as extremely provocative. Tashiev further stated more ultranationalist statements in an interview to Ferghananews:

"If any nation in our country, Russians, Uzbeks, Turks or Chinese, say that they are equal to or superior to the Kyrgyz, then the state will fall apart."

During his work as chairman of the State Committee for National Security in 2020, Tashiev returned the nationality to the count in the passports of citizens of the Kyrgyz Republic. Previously, the former authorities of Kyrgyzstan refused this column and replaced it with common "citizen of Kyrgyzstan".

=== Mother's name in passport ===
Tashiev, being the head of the State Committee of National Security, in 2023 publicly criticized the Constitutional Court's decision to allow the mother's name to appear in the passport of the country's citizens instead of the father's name for citizens who will to do so, and demanded it to cancel its decision, that goes against Constitution of Kyrgyz Republic:

"No mother name in passport, whoever accepted this decision must cancel it!"

Public organizations and human rights activists regarded this as an attack on women's rights in Kyrgyzstan and threat on Constitutional Court. The Venice Commission supported the position of the Constitutional Court.

=== Corruption scandals ===
Kamchybek Tashiev's family is closely connected with the fuel business in the south of the country. The journalist notes that even before coming to power, the head of the State Committee for National Security was associated with the fuel business. The Jalal-Abad oil refinery is registered on his relatives.

The 31-year-old nephew of the head of the State Committee for National Security, Kamchybek Tashiev, headed a large oil refinery in Jalal-Abad.

The International Network of Investigative Journalists helped find four documents. Thus, one of them shows that Region Oil LLC exports fuel oil produced by Kyrgyz Petroleum Company CJSC for $0.34 per kilogram. In two days, on June 23 and 24, 2021, the company supplied 3,666 tons of fuel oil to the Fergana Oil Refinery in Uzbekistan. At the plant of Kyrgyz Petroleum Company CJSC, fuel oil costs almost two times cheaper - at $0.22. It turns out that due to the difference in prices, Region Oil earned 37 million soms from the export of fuel oil. Journalist-investigator Bolot Temirov stated:

“In two days, an intermediary company earns almost a quarter of its annual profit by selling the products of a state-owned enterprise. At the same time, the heads of the state plant and the intermediary firm are connected with the chairman of the State Committee for National Security”

The company Tomas and Co, previously owned by Kazybek Tashiev, brother of Kamchybek Tashiev, won tenders totaling approximately 58 million soms (more than $1 million) between 2016 and 2020. This information was revealed in an investigation by Temirov Live media outlet.

The company of the son of the chairman of the State Committee for National Security Kamchybek Tashiev Taimuras won several tenders in Jalal-Abad. Journalists emphasize that the company of Taimuras Tashiev was the only participant in these tenders. In addition, Temirov Live investigators suggested that the 19-year-old son of Shaiyrbek Tashiev, Elmirbek, plans to participate in the tenders. On April 9, he registered on the public procurement website as an individual entrepreneur.

=== Pressure on Free Media ===
After the investigation of the journalist, mass attacked has started on Kyrgyz media. Journalist Bolot Temirov was arrested, stripped of his Kyrgyz citizenship and expelled from the country for his investigations on Tashiev and his family clan.

Kyrgyzstan has dropped 50 positions in Reporters Without Borders' freedom of speech rating in the three years since president Sadyr Japarov and head of SCNS Kamchybek Tashiev came to power.

=== Death of Marat Kazakpaev ===
Prominent Kyrgyz political scientist Marat Kazakbaev was detained in April 2021 on suspicion of high treason. Before that, he released a number of critical publications that ridiculed the activities of Kamchybek Tashiev as head of the State Committee for National Security. However, under mysterious circumstances, Marat Kazakpaev died in the pre-trial detention center of the State Committee for National Security on June 10, 2022. The political scientist was kept in a pre-trial detention center until he fell into a coma, without providing medical assistance and refusing treatment - his eye was leaking. Two years after his detention and death, the law enforcement agencies did not provide evidence of his guilt.

=== Family clan and relatives in power ===
After coming to power, the named son of Kamchybek Tashiev - Absattar Syrgabaev - became the presidential envoy in the Jalal-Abad region. Son-in-law Tagaybek Kazakbaev is a member of the board of directors of Kyrgyzaltyn, Nurgazy Matisakov's nephew is the prosecutor of the Uzgen district, his brother Baigazy Matisakov is the head of Kyrgyz Petroleum Company CJSC, an employee of his TV Channel - Ramis Kaimov - became the director of one of the state resorts in the Jalal-Abad region. One of his brothers - Shairbek Tashiev - is a member of Kyrgyz Parliament. The son of Kamchybek Tashiev Taimuras was elected a deputy of the Jalal-Abad city council. Kamchybek Tashiev's nephew works as an assistant prosecutor in the family "family nest" - the city of Jalal-Abad. Many relatives of the head of the State Committee for National Security were also found before in the civil service in the Jalal-Abad region and among employees of law enforcement agencies. Nephew of Tashiev - Zamirbek Kozhomuratov - became Deputy Minister of Digital Development.

The appointment of relatives to lucrative and honorary positions is recognized by the UN Convention as one of the types of corruption.

In 2013, his son Timurlan was arrested on charges of stealing stolen cars. Later, the case was closed due to the expiration of the statute of limitations, after one episode, the case was terminated due to the statement of the injured party, that he had no claim against the accused.

=== Circumventing sanctions on Russia ===
The Open Dialog Foundation in May 2023 published a massive report entitled "Russia's allies in the war against Ukraine. Kazakhstan and Kyrgyzstan are a reliable rear of the Russian army" with attached materials. Open Dialog Foundation is headquartered in Brussels and is actively supported by the European Union.

Report mentions head of Kyrgyz security authority SCNS Kamchybek Tashiev as a person who is proposed to be sanctioned for helping Russia to circumvent international sanctions. From report:

"In 2022, Kyrgyzstan exported 115,920 electric detonators to Russia worth $882,400, although it did not make any deliveries in 2021. Electric detonators are used in the production of anti-personnel and anti-tank mines. In turn, Kyrgyzstan imported 193,536 electric detonators from Canada in 2022 worth $3.7 million. There is reason to believe that Kyrgyzstan re-exported Canadian-made electric detonators to Russia. Exports of radar, radio navigation and radio remote control equipment in 2022 amounted to 169,800 thousand dollars, which is 60% more than in 2021. The amount of exports of telescopic sights (for weapons) from Kyrgyzstan to Russia in 2022 $199,700, which is 13 times more than in 2021. Deliveries of parts of aircraft, helicopters and unmanned aerial vehicles from Kyrgyzstan to Russia increased from zero in 2021 to $1.5 million in 2022. In 2019–2021, Kyrgyzstan did not export parts of lasers, devices, and optical instruments to Russia, but in 2022, exports amounted to $193,100. In 2022, Kyrgyzstan also abnormally increased the re-export of dual-use goods: $315,700, 109 times more than in 2021. Shipments of integrated circuits from Kyrgyzstan to Russia in 2022 amounted to $612,800, which is 104 times more than in 2021. Exports of printed circuits in 2022 amounted to $23,700 – 11 times more than in 2021. The export of computers for automatic processing from Kyrgyzstan to Russia amounted to $2.5 million, which is almost 7 times more than in 2021. The export of electrical machinery and equipment for special purposes increased 9 times - from $40,700 in 2021 to $367,300 in 2022."

Some of the goods imported into Kyrgyzstan are not actually delivered to the declared destination. Since these goods are delivered to Kyrgyzstan from Europe through the territory of Russia, cargo carriers leave the goods in Russia, and in Kyrgyzstan they simply receive stamps that the goods were supposedly imported to Kyrgyzstan. This is confirmed by the Finnish national public broadcaster Yle, which in March 2023 reported, citing the head of the Finnish customs control, that some of the goods either remain in Russia on their way to Kyrgyzstan or are re-exported from Kyrgyzstan to Russia. The shipments were also investigated by representatives of Radio Liberty in Kyrgyzstan, about how companies in Kyrgyzstan and Kazakhstan supply Western equipment to Russian firms associated with the invasion of Ukraine.

The Russian edition of Kommersant also announced on August 9, 2023, the construction of a complex with an area of 163 thousand square meters in the vicinity of Bishkek for parallel import of goods to the Russian Federation. As experts note, its appearance will increase the volume of high-quality warehouses in Kyrgyzstan by almost four times. However, the warehouse builders deny all allegations.

== Personal life ==
Tashiev has five children. He holds the rank of Lieutenant general. He speaks Kyrgyz and Russian.

== Awards ==
- Hero of the Kyrgyz Republic (2022)
- Order "Dostyk" 1st degree (2025, Kazakhstan)
- Certificate of Honor of the Kyrgyz Republic (2011)
- Jubilee badge “100th anniversary of the formation of the Kara-Kyrgyz Autonomous Region” (February 20, 2025)
