= Raimbek Matraimov =

Kyrgyz politician

Deputy head of the State Customs Service of Kyrgyzstan
- In office 25 August 2015 – 23 November 2015

Personal details
- Born: 3 May 1971 (age 54) Agartuu, Kyrgyz SSR, USSR
- Citizenship: Kyrgyzstan
- Party: My Homeland Kyrgyzstan
- Spouse: Uulkan Turgunova

Raimbek Matraimov (born 3 May 1971) is a Kyrgyz politician. He was the deputy chair of the State Customs Service of Kyrgyzstan (2015 – 2017). After being fired in late 2017, Matraimov became a central figure in an ongoing large scale money-laundering case, one of the biggest scandals in the history of Kyrgyz politics.

== Early life ==
Matraimov was born in the village of Agartuu, in Kara-Suu district of Osh oblast, Kyrgyzstan. He started working at the State Customs Service in 1997 as a regular inspector. In 2004 he started his steady rise within the service: he was first appointed head of the human resources department at the Southern department of the State Customs Service, a year later he became deputy head of the Southern department.

His longest managing position tenure lasted for six years: from 2007 till 2013 Matraimov was head of Osh department of the State Customs Service. In 2013 he was promoted to chair the whole Southern department, of which Osh department was part of. Finally, in 2015 he became deputy chairman of the whole State Customs Service, his highest government position to date.

== Accusations of corruption ==
=== Earliest accusations ===
First reports that Matraimov had significant unexplained wealth surfaced in 2017, when a number of Kyrgyz media outlets wrote stories about sports clubs that Matraimov had built around his native Southern part of Kyrgyzstan and about a luxurious mansion that he built for himself in the center of Osh, the second biggest city in the country. Matraimov denied claims made by journalists, but despite this he was fired by then president of Kyrgyzstan Almazbek Atambayev in November 2017.

=== Major investigations ===
After Atambayev stepped down as the president in December 2017, Matraimov filed a lawsuit against the state, and in 2018 the court made a decision to reinstate him as the deputy head of the Customs Service. Despite the court decision, Matraimov preferred not to return to the position, but at the same time he switched to a more public lifestyle. Previously known as a government official who had barely ever given a single interview to the media, Matraimov released his first ever video statement in May 2019. He again denied any allegations of corruption, and said that he was a victim of a smear campaign by the former president Atambayev.

In the same month, the charity foundation run by Matraimov's family organized a volleyball tournament in Osh oblast of Kyrgyzstan, and a number of high-profile Kyrgyz politicians visited it, including Dastan Jumabekov, speaker of the Kyrgyz parliament, and Kubatbek Boronov, then vice prime minister of Kyrgyzstan.

Despite this display of his connections in politics, Matraimov kept being a central figure in further corruption investigations by Kyrgyz journalists. On May 30, 2019, the Kyrgyz edition of Radio Liberty published its first major investigation about the possible source of wealth of Matraimov.

In the investigation, Radio Liberty journalists claimed that Matraimov earned his wealth while being part of a corruption scheme that allowed a group of Chinese companies led by the secretive Abdukadyr family bring goods into Kyrgyzstan without paying any customs fees. One of the major sources of the investigation, a self-confessed money launderer Aierken Saimaiti who worked for Abdukadyrs, was murdered in Istanbul in November 2019.

Although Matraimov denied any links with the murder of Saimaiti, the next part of the journalism investigation about him, heavily based on interviews with Saimaiti, was published on November 21, 2019, ten days after the assassination of Saimaiti. This time it was a joint investigation by Radio Liberty, OCCRP and Kloop, a Kyrgyz media outlet, and it revealed more details about the corruption schemes at the Kyrgyz customs service.

According to November investigations, Matraimov not only backed illegal activities of the Abdukadyr family business, but got involved in at least one joint real estate project with them: Matraimov's wife Uulkan Turgunova was revealed to be a co-owner of an estate in Dubai together with one of the Abdukadyr family members. Neither Matraimov, nor his wife have ever had an official salary that would allow them to invest into such an expensive project.

=== Protests and lawsuit ===
Four days after the November publications, hundreds of people took part in a protest in front of the Kyrgyz government headquarters in Bishkek, demanding from authorities to investigate corruption scheme described in the new part of the journalism investigation. Matraimov and his family kept on denying all the accusations, and in December 2019 they filed a lawsuit against Radio Liberty and Kloop. While Reporters Without Borders named this lawsuit "absurd" and called on a court to dismiss it, this never happened. Matraimov and his family demand more than 700,000 Euros of compensation from media outlets, but there have not been any verdict given yet.

=== Arrest and trial ===
Following the uprising and the change of the government that took place in Kyrgyzstan in October 2020, Matraimov was arrested on October 20, 2020. Kyrgyz National Security Committee (GKNB) claimed that Matraimov was alleged to have made hundreds of millions of dollars from smuggling. After spending just one day in custody, he was released and put under house arrest.

In February 2021 Matraimov was sentenced to pay a fine of 3000 US Dollars. After public uproar, he was arrested again, and the new case was opened against him.

== Personal life ==
Matraimov is married to Uulkan Turgunova, who appeared in journalism investigations alongside him. After analyzing Turgunova's private social media accounts, Kyrgyz journalists revealed she owned expensive watches and jewelry that she would not be able to afford with her official salary. Author of one of the stories about Turgunova was physically attacked in Bishkek in January 2020, three weeks after he published a story about her wealth. In 2020 Bellingcat and the OCCRP connected Matraimov and Turgunova to properties, including a cottage at Issyk-Kul and a luxury apartment in Dubai. Matraimov and his wife Turgunova, were both sanctioned by the United States Department of State citing corruption.

Tilek Matraimov, another brother of Raimbek, is the head of Kara-Suu district administration.
