= Committee for State Security of the Kirghiz Soviet Socialist Republic =

Committee for State Security of the Kirghiz Soviet Socialist Republic (Russian: Комитет государственной безопасности Киргизской ССР), abbreviated as the KGB of KySSR was the security agency of the Kirghiz Soviet Socialist Republic, being the local branch of Committee for State Security of the USSR. It was succeeded in 1991 by the State Committee for National Security (Kyrgyzstan).

== History ==
The modern Kyrgyz intelligence services were established in December 1917 as the All-Russian Extraordinary Commission (Cheka). A year later, the much more local Pishpek district Investigation Commission was established. Once the internal borders of the USSR were established in the early 1920s, the Regional State Political Directorate of the Kara-Kyrgyz Autonomous Oblast was created, which was not an independent agency due to the oblast being part of the RSFSR. In the 50s, the Committee for State Security (KGB) was established in the then Kirghiz SSR, which encompassed all of what is modern Kyrgyzstan. During its long existence, it acted as the republican affiliate for the national KGB agency. On 20 November 1991, Kyrgyz President Askar Akayev signed a presidential decree establishing the State Committee for National Security (UKMK/GKNB) on the basis of the KGB in Kyrgyzstan.

== Chairmen ==
- Alexander Tereshchenko (March 27, 1954 - February 11, 1956)
- Nikolai Yermolov (February 11, 1956 - May 6, 1961)
- Petr Chvertko (June 26, 1961 - March 19, 1967)
- Dzhumabek Asankulov (March 19, 1967 - April 18, 1978)
- Nikolai Lomov (April 18, 1978 - December 12, 1985)
- Vladimir Ryabokon (December 12, 1985 - January 16, 1989)
- Dzhumabek Asankulov (January 16, 1989 - August 19, 1991)
- Anarbek Bakayev (September 6, 1991)
