= Mekenim Kyrgyzstan =

My Homeland Kyrgyzstan Мекеним Кыргызстан
- Leader: Mirlan Bakirov
- Founded: 2 November 2015
- Registered: 24 May 2019
- Headquarters: Bakaev 132, Bishkek
- Youth wing: Youth committee
- Ideology: Liberalism; Conservative liberalism Decentralisation; Russophilia
- Political position: Centre-right
- Colours: Yellow; Red
- Jogorku Kenesh: 0 / 120

Website
- mekenimkyrgyzstan.kg

Mekenim Kyrgyzstan (lit. 'My Homeland Kyrgyzstan'; Kyrgyz: Мекеним Кыргызстан) is a centre-right political party in Kyrgyzstan which was founded in 2015. In August 2020, Ata-Zhurt announced it would be running on a joint list with the party for the upcoming elections. The party is viewed as supportive of Kyrgyz President Sooronbay Jeenbekov.

The party is considered to have been created and financed by the powerful Maitraimov family, especially Rayimbek Matraimov. Matraimov has been involved in numerous corruption cases concerning his service in the State Customs Service of Kyrgyzstan and is alleged to have financial links to President Jeenbekov. One of the candidates in the election is Raimbek's brother and current MP Iskender Matraimov. Other members include former Bishkek Deputy Mayor Mirlan Amanturov and Deputy Speaker of the Supreme Council of Kyrgyzstan, Mirlan Bakirov.

== Electoral history ==
First logo

=== 2016 ===
According to the results of the elections of local keneshes of the Kyrgyz Republic, appointed for 11 December 2016 - mandates:

- in the Bishkek city kenesh of 45 mandates - received 17,360 votes, 13.03% (7 mandates)
- in Osh city kenesh of 45 mandates - received 6,036 votes, 11.8% (6 mandates)

=== 2018 ===
According to the results of the elections of local keneshes of the Kyrgyz Republic, appointed for January 28, 2018 - mandates:

- in the Tash-Komur city council of Jalal-Abad region out of 31 mandates - received 3202 votes, 30.32% (10 mandates)
- in the Kara-Balta city council of the Zhayil district of the Chui region out of 31 mandates - received 2910 votes, 19.77% (7 mandates)

=== 2019 ===
- On April 3, 2019, Zhanarbek Alymov was appointed the leader of the faction from the Political Party "Mekenim Kyrgyzstan" in the Bishkek City Council.

2021

- The party did not participate in the 2021 parliamentary election. Former members of the party joined other parties to run in the election.
