= Akshumkar =

Akshumkar (Kyrgyz: Акшумкар, lit. 'White Falcon') is a conservative-liberal Kyrgyz political party led by ex-Prime Minister and two-time presidential candidate Temir Sariyev. Originally founded in April 2007 as an opposition parliamentary faction, it later officially became a political party. The party, which has been part of the political opposition since its founding, does not hold any seats in the national legislature. It participated in the 2010 parliamentary election, but only recorded 4.71% of the vote and thereby failed to pass the 5% national threshold.

The party supports decentralisation, state management only in parts of the economy vital to the national interest and non-interference with private business and property, a mixed-member proportional representation voting system where no one party can hold more than 50% of seats, a reduction in the power of the President, and an independent judiciary (including an independent body for selecting candidates).
