= Köktongdu =

Köktongdu Көктоңду
- Location within Kyrgyzstan
- Coordinates: 41°14′30″N 72°58′10″E
- Country: Kyrgyzstan
- Region: Jalal-Abad
- District: Bazar-Korgon

Population (2021)
  - Total: 4,133
- Time zone: UTC+6

Köktongdu (Kyrgyz: Көктоңду, before 2004: Pravda) is a village in Jalal-Abad Region of Kyrgyzstan. It is part of the Bazar-Korgon District. Its population was 4,133 in 2021.
