= 1995 Kyrgyz parliamentary election =

Parliamentary elections were held in Kyrgyzstan on 5 February 1995, with a second round on 19 February. The Social Democratic Party of Kyrgyzstan emerged as the largest party, with 14 of the 105 seats. Voter turnout was 76%.

== Results ==
Party	Votes	%	Seats
Social Democratic Party of Kyrgyzstan			14
Asaba			4
Unity Party of Kyrgyzstan			4
Ata Meken Socialist Party			3
Republican Democratic Party			3
Party of Communists of Kyrgyzstan			3
Republican People's Party of Kyrgyzstan			3
Agrarian Party of the Kyrgyz Republic			1
Agrarian Labour Party of Kyrgyzstan			1
Democratic Movement of Kyrgyzstan			1
Democratic Women's Party of Kyrgyzstan			1
Independents			67
Total			105
Total votes	1,735,009	–	
Registered voters/turnout	2,275,450	76.25	
Source: Nohlen et al.
