= Kyzyl-Uraan =

Kyzyl-Uraan Кызыл-Ураан
- Location within Kyrgyzstan
- Coordinates: 41°42′0″N 73°18′0″E
- Country: Kyrgyzstan
- Region: Jalal-Abad Region
- District: Toktogul District
- Elevation: 1,399 m (4,590 ft)

Population (2021)
  - Total: 3,109
- Time zone: UTC+6

Kyzyl-Uraan is a village in Jalal-Abad Region of Kyrgyzstan. It is part of the Toktogul District. Its population was 3,109 in 2021.
