= Ata-Zhurt =

Fatherland Ата-журт
- Leader: Akhmatbek Keldibekov
- Founder: Kamchybek Tashiev
- Founded: 14 November 2006
- Headquarters: Bishkek, Kyrgyzstan
- Ideology: Kyrgyz nationalism National conservatism
- Political position: Right-wing
- National affiliation: Ak Jol (2007–2010); Respublika–Ata Zhurt (2014–2017)
- Supreme Council: 18 / 90

Website
- www.atajurt.kg

Ata-Zhurt or Ata-Jurt (Kyrgyz: Ата-журт [ɑˈtɑ‿dʒuɾt]; lit. 'Fatherland') is a political party in Kyrgyzstan. Its political base is in the south of the country, but the party is headquartered in its capital Bishkek. In 2014, it merged with the Respublika party to create Respublika–Ata Zhurt, but the two parties ended up splitting again four months before the parliamentary elections of 2020, in which Ata-Zhurt instead formed a joint list with Mekenim Kyrgyzstan. After the results of that vote were annulled, Ata-Zhurt contested the 2021 elections independently and came in first with 19% of the vote. The party is led by Kamchybek Tashiyev, and has previously supported the ousted former President Kurmanbek Bakiyev.

== 2010 parliamentary elections ==
In the Kyrgyzstani parliamentary election, 2010, the party said it would seek to restore Bakiyev to power, and claimed it was more popular than the interim government. The party also suggested it would roll back the 2010 referendum and restore the presidency to its former state.

On 7 October, the party's headquarters in Bishkek were ransacked and party literature set on fire by a group of demonstrators who called for the party to be banned. The demonstrators allegedly included family members of the victims of April 2010 violence in Bishkek.

In the election, the party won a number of seats from its traditional southern bastion, though it barely passed the threshold in the capital and the Chuy region. The party received the votes of 8.89% of eligible voters, giving it 28 of 120 seats in parliament. This result made the party the first of five parties to surpass the support threshold of 5% of eligible voters necessary to enter parliament. As a result, Ata-Zhurt was part of the governing coalition, with its MP Akhmatbek Keldibekov chosen as Speaker of Parliament.

Among the party's parliamentary deputies are some individuals of non-Kyrgyz ancestry, including Ravshanbek Sabirov, the first Tajik to hold such a position, and Roman Shin.

=== Violence ===
Kamchibek Tashiyev, the head of Ata-Zhurt, said he had been attacked in his home on October 23, 2010. "They broke in like bandits...I think they intended to shoot me. I believe they tried to eliminate me—the forces that want to cancel election results and impose a state of emergency. I know for sure, GSNB (security services) was behind these actions."
