= Respublika–Ata Zhurt =

Respublika–Ata Zhurt Республика–Ата Журт
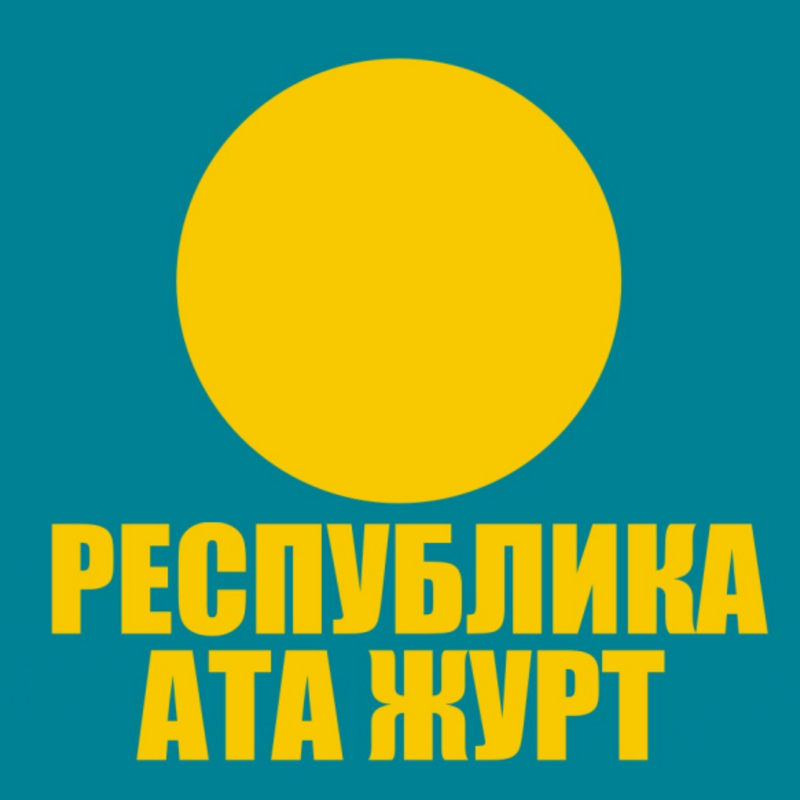
- Chairman: Kamchybek Tashiev
- Founded: 20 October 2014
- Dissolved: 2017
- Merger of: Respublika; Ata-Zhurt
- Succeeded by: Respublika; Ata-Zhurt
- Headquarters: Bishkek, Kyrgyzstan
- Membership: 400,782
- Ideology: Liberalism; Reformism
- Political position: Centre to centre-right
- Seats in the Supreme Council of Kyrgyzstan: 28 / 120

Party flag
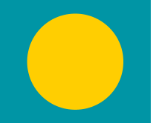

Website
- respublika-atajurt.kg

Respublika–Ata Zhurt (Kyrgyz: Республика–Ата Журт, sometimes spelled as Respublika–Ata Jurt) was a Kyrgyz political party that was created after the merger of the Respublika and Ata-Zhurt parties in 2014. However, the two parties ended up splitting apart again in 2020.

== Ideology ==
The main goal of the political party is the development of liberalism through reforms aimed at increasing democracy in the country and greater transparency of the bureaucracy.

The "Respublika" and "Ata-Zhurt" parties have united into one in the name of stability and prosperity of the country, — Kamchybek Tashiev at the extraordinary congress of the "Respublika — Ata-Zhurt" party.
