= Bir Bol =

Political Party of State Unity and Patriotism "Bir Bol" Мамлекеттик биримдик жана мекенчилдик саясий партиясы «Бир Бол»
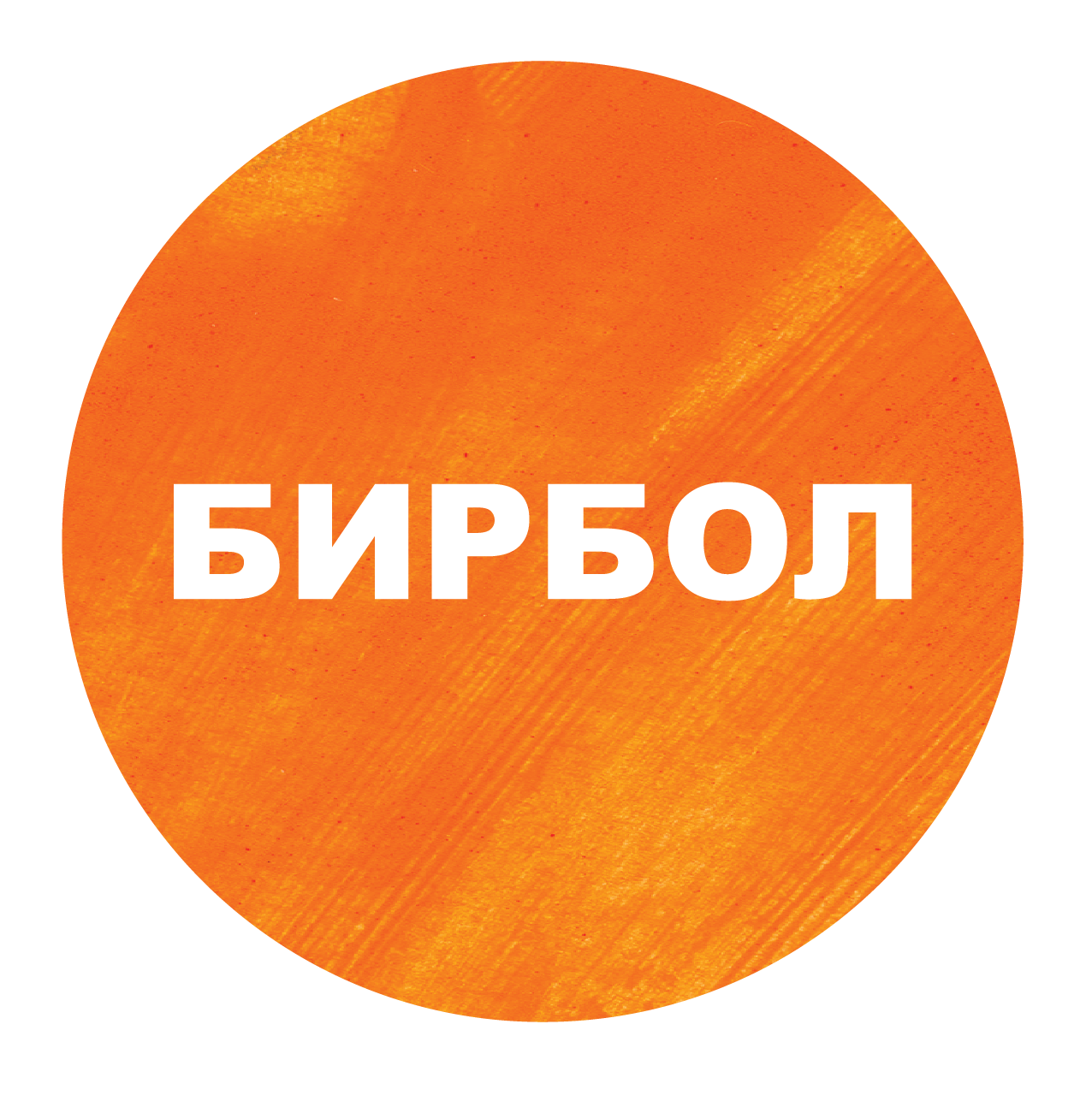
- Leader: Altynbek Sulaymanov
- Founded: 28 June 2010
- Dissolved: 12 October 2021
- Merged into: Alliance
- Headquarters: 7 Razzakova Street, Bishkek
- Ideology: Liberalism; Russophilia
- Political position: Centre to centre-right
- Colors: Blue; Orange

Party flag
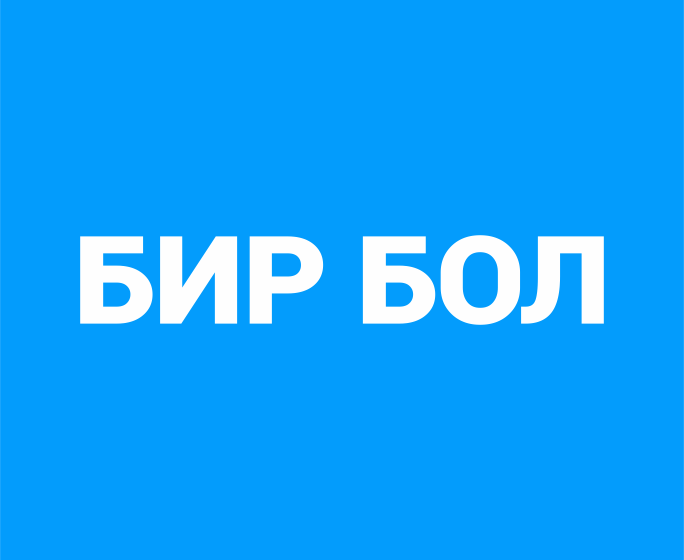

Website
- http://birbol.kg

Bir Bol (Kyrgyz: Бир Бол [pɪɾ poɫ]; lit. 'Unite'), officially the Political Party of State Unity and Patriotism "Bir Bol", (Note: Kyrgyz: Мамлекеттик биримдик жана мекенчилдик саясий партиясы «Бир Бол», romanized: Mamlekettik birimdik jana mekenchildik saiasii partiasy «Bir Bol») was a liberal political party in Kyrgyzstan. It was led by Altynbek Sulaymanov. The party had been described having 'low visibility'. The party entered parliament for the first time with in 2015, following the 2015 Kyrgyz parliamentary election in which it garnered 8.52% of the vote (12 seats). It lost all its 12 seats in the 2020 Kyrgyz parliamentary election, which was subsequently annulled. The party participated in the 2021 elections as part of the Alliance party.

== History ==
The party was founded on 28 June 2010 as the Liberal Democratic Party "Bir Bol". The party opposed the government of Kyrgyz President Sooronbay Jeenbekov.
