= Kyrgyzstan (political party) =

Kyrgyzstan Кыргызстан
- Leader: Kanatbek Isaev
- Founded: May 2015
- Ideology: Cultural conservatism Social market economy Economic liberalism Sustainable development Pro-Jeenbekov
- Political position: Centre
- Colours: Blue-green, Yellow
- Supreme Council: 0 / 90

Party flag

Kyrgyzstan (Kyrgyz: Кыргызстан, romanized: Kırgızstan) is an eponymously-named centrist political party in Kyrgyzstan. It was established in May 2015, by Kanatbek Isaev, a former Respublika Member of Parliament. It is viewed as "utterly apolitical" and focuses on supporting the government of Kyrgyz President Sooronbay Jeenbekov.

The party has a strong support base in the south of the country. In the 2015 Parliamentary elections, the Kyrgyzstan Party won 18 seats, having gained 12.75% of the votes.
