= 2010 Kyrgyz parliamentary election =

- 10 October 2010
- All 120 seats in the Supreme Council; 61 seats needed for a majority
- Turnout: 59.19% (▼14.68pp)
Party	Leader	Vote %	Seats	+/–
Ata-Zhurt	Kamchybek Tashiev	15.89	28	New
SDPK	Almazbek Atambayev	14.69	26	+15
Ar-Namys	Felix Kulov	14.21	25	+25
Respublika	Ömürbek Babanov	13.02	23	New
Ata-Meken	Omurbek Tekebayev	10.31	18	+18
This lists parties that won seats. See the complete results below.
Chairwoman of the Transitional Technical Government before	Prime Minister after
Roza Otunbayeva; SDPK	Almazbek Atambayev; SDPK

Early parliamentary elections were held in Kyrgyzstan on 10 October 2010. All 120 seats of the Supreme Council were elected by the party list system. Seats were allocated to all parties who obtained more than 5% of the vote overall and more than 0.5% in each of the nine provinces, capped at 65 seats per party.

Ata-Zhurt won a plurality of seats, while the ruling Social Democratic Party finished second and Ar-Namys came third.

== Background ==
In April 2010, President Kurmanbek Bakiyev was ousted, which brought to power an interim government led by Roza Otunbayeva. An election and reform plan was unveiled on 19 April 2010. A referendum in June overwhelmingly approved a reform to turn the country from a presidential system to a parliamentary system. The new constitution would allow the parliament to choose a prime minister and also to play a key role in forming the new government.

Kyrgyzstan's geostrategic location is vital because it supplies the War in Afghanistan through the Manas Air Base, and it is also the only country to host both an American and Russian base. Political developments in 2010 also pleased the US but were an annoyance to Russia, who warned that the first parliamentary democracy in Central Asia could be catastrophic for Kyrgyzstan. Russia also considers the area as its sphere of influence.

Originally, the presidential elections were to be held on the same day. However, these were delayed until October 2011, with Otunbayeva remaining president until 31 December 2011.

== Electoral system ==
In the previous election, there were 90 seats, though this was increased to 120 after the constitutional referendum.

According to Article 77 of the Kyrgyz Republic Code on Elections, the threshold for the allotment of seats is receiving five percent of the votes of all eligible voters entered on the voter rolls. For this reason, only the top five parties (Ata-Zhurt, SDPK, Ar-Namys, Respublika and Ata-Meken) were allotted seats. The sixth party, Butun Kyrgyzstan, received more than five percent of the votes cast, but because it did not receive more than five percent of the votes of all eligible voters entered on the voter rolls, it was not allotted any seats.

Article 77 also requires parties to win 0.5% of the votes of all eligible voters in each oblast of Kyrgyzstan, as well as the cities of Bishkek and Osh. Though Ata-Zhurt won the plurality of the vote, especially with their southern stronghold, an electoral official said they barely overcame the 0.5% barrier in Bishkek and in Chüy Region.

== Campaign ==
Over 3,000 candidates from 29 political parties competed for the 120 seats, with the BBC saying that no party could easily win a majority and the result was hard to predict. Leaflets distributed in the south of the country urged people "not to tolerate" parties led by northerners, in a sign of remaining tensions following the 2010 South Kyrgyzstan riots.

Ar-Namys opposed the newly founded parliamentary system and said it would restore the older system of presidential rule. Ata-Zhurt campaigned for the return of Bakiyev from his exile in Belarus, and also advocated a return to presidential rule.

Roza Otunbayeva vowed to uphold a "spirit of fairness and transparency." She also talked of the importance of the election: "These elections are of fateful importance for our people and state. We are not just electing a parliament but starting a new system and opening a new page in our history." A month before the election she threatened to introduce a state of emergency, and as a result postpone voting if parties escalated tensions in the country.

== Opinion polls ==
It said six parties were expected to exceed the 5% threshold and win seats.

A poll of 1,500 people in late September by Perspectiva showed seven parties crossing the 5% threshold to win seats:

Party	Leader	Percentage
Ata Meken Socialist Party	Omurbek Tekebayev	14.6%
Social Democratic Party of Kyrgyzstan	Almazbek Atambaev	10.5%
Ata-Zhurt	Kamchybek Tashiyev	9.9%
Respublika Party	Omurbek Babanov	8.7%
Akshumkar	Temir Sariyev	6.9%
Ar-Namys	Felix Kulov	6.9%
United Kyrgyzstan	Adakhan Madumarov	5.7%
Other		13.8%
Undecided		23%

The Kyrgyz nationalist party, Ata-Zhurt, were expected to do well among ethnic Kyrgyz in the south. Ata-Meken and the SPDK were supporters of the interim administration.

== Conduct ==
The organisations conducting monitoring were in the first positions among NGO according to Mass Media for the period from August till October. Traditionally these are: "For Democracy and a Civil Society" Coalition of NGO, "Taza Shailoo" Association. The "Free generation" Liberal Youth Alliance for the first time joined the supervision organization, and young men became target audience. On the day of voting in 127 stations of the country, young short-term observers carried out monitoring of electoral rights within the limits of the campaign "Youth for fair elections. Let's prove it!"

The elections were observed by 850 international monitors from 32 organisations, including 300 monitors from the Organization for Security and Co-operation in Europe. The international team of observers hailed the vote, with the OSCE team saying the election were a step in the "further consolidation of the democratic process." While the observers said that this was unlike other elections in the past and did not have the same irregularities, they did point out some peculiarities whereas the Central Election Commission were underprepared for the polls, and such ""under-the-counter dealings" may have taken place. Only one observer had a negative reaction to the vote, though most were satisfied that this was a "step in the right direction."

Otunbayeva, who had refused to push back the election despite warnings of potential new unrest, hailed the election: "We have not known such elections for the last 20 years." Despite her comments, the government was reported to have been "plunged into a state of shock" over the results. Russia's Kommersant reported that the victory of Ata-Zhurt was a blow to the interim government.

Kamchibek Tashiyev, the head of Ata-Zhurt, said he had been attacked. "They broke in like bandits...I think they intended to shoot me. I believe they tried to eliminate me – the forces that want to cancel election results and impose a state of emergency. I know for sure, GSNB (security services) was (sic) behind these actions." Protestors attacked the offices of the Ata-Zhurt party, burned campaign leaflets and demanded they be banned from the vote. Zarylbek Rysaliyev, the interior minister, also claimed to know of about 10 "areas of potential clashes with some hotheads planning to snatch ballot boxes." There were also concerns in the international media of a renewal of ethnic strife that occurred earlier in the year.

== Results ==
Party	Votes	%	Seats	+/–
Ata-Zhurt	257,100	15.89	28	New
Social Democratic Party	237,634	14.69	26	+15
Ar-Namys	229,916	14.21	25	+25
Respublika	210,594	13.02	23	New
Ata Meken Socialist Party	166,714	10.31	18	+18
United Kyrgyzstan	139,548	8.63	0	New
Akshumkar	78,673	4.86	0	New
Zamandash	55,907	3.46	0	New
Meken Yntymagy	46,070	2.85	0	New
Commonwealth	35,560	2.20	0	New
Birikken Eldik Kiymyly	32,355	2.00	0	New
Akiykat	24,431	1.51	0	New
Greens Party of Kyrgyzstan	11,056	0.68	0	New
People's Democratic Party	10,960	0.68	0	New
Egemen Kyrgyzstan	9,338	0.58	0	New
Republican People's Party	8,574	0.53	0	New
Party of Communists	7,818	0.48	0	−8
Party of Afghan War Veterans	7,487	0.46	0	New
SSR Union	5,776	0.36	0	New
April 7 Youth Movement	5,484	0.34	0	New
Aikol El	5,311	0.33	0	New
Union of Peoples of Kyrgyzstan	5,066	0.31	0	New
Kyrgyzstan Housebuilders Party	4,475	0.28	0	New
Jashasyn Kyrgyzstan	3,937	0.24	0	New
Party of Economic Revival	1,935	0.12	0	New
Kaganat	1,802	0.11	0	New
Ak-Tilek	1,784	0.11	0	New
Ak Sanat	939	0.06	0	New
Liberal Progressive Party	671	0.04	0	New
Against all	10,839	0.67	0	–
Total	1,617,754	100.00	120	+30
Valid votes	1,617,754	96.31		
Invalid/blank votes	61,956	3.69		
Total votes	1,679,710	100.00		
Registered voters/turnout	2,837,989	59.19		
Source: Central Commission for Elections and Referendums

== Reactions ==
The result was also called a surprise because of the victory of Ata-Zhurt and its calls for Bakiyev's return, despite the election taking place under the auspices of the government that overthrew him. Thus this result "would seem to neutralize the uprising" earlier in the year. With a razor-thin plurality, the party would need an alliance of two other parties but it was seen as an "unenviable task" to form a coalition. A weak government could even force another election before the government's mandate runs out. Parallels were also drawn to the failure to form a government in Iraq following the general election there and the possibility for more instability. Furthermore, there was uncertainty in regards to the American-leased Manas air base as Ata-Zurt campaigned against extending the lease past 2011.

An analyst in Kazakhstan also suggested the election would "face its toughest test" if the losers opt to challenge the results in both the courts and the streets. "If certain people know they will lose their high-ranking posts after the election, then it's in their interest to destabilise the situation. They could take steps to remain in power or create chaos."

The Washington Post said the biggest surprise of the election was that it was "not a foregone conclusion," and thus it made this "small...nation the first in Central Asia to hold free elections in pursuit of a democratic system." It also quoted Alexey Malashenko of the Carnegie Moscow Center who said "These elections were very successful because they took place at all. Kyrgyzstan showed it is an exception in Central Asia. Despite many predictions to the contrary, the elections were held." US President Barack Obama congratulated Kyrgyzstan for this "historic" election, and said it proved that the Kyrgyz people were "committed to power transfers by peaceful, democratic means." Russian Foreign Minister Sergei Lavrov said he feared there would be "difficulties" after the poll. "An abrupt shift to a parliamentary model can create difficulties...Now some difficult work to form a coalition lies ahead."

== Aftermath ==
The result was seen as setting the stage for a fractured legislature without much capacity for decision-making, with Ar-Namys likely to play the role of kingmaker.

Following the election, SDPK, Respublika and Ata-Meken agreed on a coalition in late November. However, as soon as the coalition was officially agreed to on 2 December, it collapsed when it failed to elect a speaker of parliament (with only 58 of the 67 coalition MPs voting for the designated speaker in a secret vote).

On 15 December Respublika announced it had successfully negotiated the creation of a coalition government with SDPK and Ata-Zhurt. SDPK's Almazbek Atambayev became Prime Minister with 92-seats in the 120-seat chamber, Ata-Zhurt's Akhmatbek Keldibekov was chosen as Speaker of Parliament with 101 to 14 votes and Respublika's Omurbek Babanov would then become Deputy Prime Minister. The new government was approved later on the same day.
