= Respublika (political party) =

Respublika Республика
- Leader: Mirlan Jeenchoroyev
- Founder: Ömürbek Babanov
- Founded: 2010
- Headquarters: Bishkek, Kyrgyzstan
- Ideology: Classical liberalism Parliamentarism; Kyrgyz nationalism
- Political position: Centre to centre-right
- National affiliation: Respublika–Ata Zhurt (2014–2019)
- Supreme Council: 0 / 90

Website
- respublika.kg

Respublika (Kyrgyz: Республика, lit. 'Republic') is a political party in Kyrgyzstan. The party was formed in June 2010. Founded by Ömürbek Babanov, he served as its chairman until 2014, and during this time the party had a pro-Russia orientation. In 2014, the party merged with Ata-Zhurt to create Respublika–Ata Zhurt. However, the two parties ended up splitting back in 2020.

The party campaigned for the 2010 parliamentary elections on a platform stressing the ethnic diversity of Kyrgyzstan, and is in favor of a parliamentary system of government, as well as reducing the number of MPs from 120 to 75.
