= Social Democratic Party of Kyrgyzstan =

Social Democratic Party of Kyrgyzstan Кыргызстан социал-дeмoкратиялык партиясы
- Abbreviation: SDPK
- Chairman: Disputed between Sagynbek Abdrahmanov and Anvar Artykov
- Founders: Almazbek Atambayev; Jumabek Ibraimov; Abdoujapar Tagaev; Abdygany Erkebayev; Anatoly Maryshev; Ishenbai Kadyrbekov
- Founded: 25 September 1993
- Registered: 16 December 1994
- Dissolved: 2020
- Succeeded by: Birimdik (Jeenbekov's wing); SDK (Atambayev's wing)
- Headquarters: Shabdan Baatyr st. 4b, Bishkek
- Youth wing: SDPK Youth Wing
- Membership (2019): 40,000 (own claim)
- Ideology: Social democracy Democratic socialism Russophilia
- Political position: Centre to centre-left
- Continental affiliation: Forum of Socialists of the CIS Countries
- International affiliation: Socialist International; Progressive Alliance
- Colours: Blue; White
- Slogan: "Reliable support" (Kyrgyz: Ишенимдүү тирегиң, romanized: Ishenimdüü tireging)

Party flag (until the end of 2000s)

Website
- sdpk.kg (archived)

The Social Democratic Party of Kyrgyzstan (SDPK) (Note: Kyrgyz: Кыргызстан социал-дeмoкратиялык партиясы (КСДП), romanized: Kyrgyzstan social-demokratialyk partiasy (KSDP); Russian: Социал-демократическая партия Кыргызстана (СДПК), romanized: Sotsial-demokraticheskaya partiya Kyrgyzstana (SDPK)) was a centre-left political party in Kyrgyzstan. The SDPK was one of the oldest and largest political parties in the country. The party took an active part in the Tulip Revolution and the 2010 Revolution. The party's members included three presidents of Kyrgyzstan: Roza Otunbayeva, Almazbek Atambayev and Sooronbay Jeenbekov.

As a result of the split, the party ceased to exist. The successors of the party were Birimdik (pro-Jeenbekov wing) and the Social Democrats of Kyrgyzstan (pro-Atambayev wing). The latter declare their commitment to the ideas and principles of the SDPK party.

== History ==
=== Party in the 1990s–2000s ===
The Social Democratic Party of Kyrgyzstan was formed at a congress on 25 September 1993, and was one of the first parties established in independent Kyrgyzstan. The main initiators of the SDPK establishment were the head of the scientific and production company "Forum" Almazbek Atambayev, the mayor of Bishkek Jumabek Ibraimov, the head of the Jalal-Abad Region Abdoujapar Tagaev, the head of the Osh Region Abdygany Erkebayev, the general director of the design and technology institute "Kormmash" Anatoly Maryshev and the head of the government apparatus' department for youth policy Akylbek Japarov.

The SDPK emerged as one of the alternatives to the Communist Party, which was rapidly losing popularity in the early 1990s. The party gained popularity on the slogans of social justice against the backdrop of privatization, economic stagnation and corruption scandals.

It is unclear who became the first chairman of the party. According to one of the most viable versions accepted by experts, the party was initially led by 5-7 co-chairmen, initially their coordinator was Jumabek Ibraimov, then Almazbek Atambayev. According to Ishenbai Kadyrbekov's version, he was initially the chairman of the SDPK, but as a result of an internal split, there was a change of leadership and Atambayev became the chairman. The Atambayev-led SDPK was officially registered on 16 December 1994.

On 29 July 1999, at a meeting of the SDPK political council, Atambayev handed over the post of party leader to the speaker of the lower house of the Jogorku Kenesh, Abdygany Erkebayev.

On 20 May 2004, the Social Democratic Party of Kyrgyzstan (SDPK) agreed to join the For Fair Elections electoral alliance. In October 2004, the El Party led by Melis Eshimkanov merged with the SDPK in preparation for the February 2005 parliamentary elections.

The SDPK actively participated in the Tulip Revolution of 2005 as part of the opposition to President Akayev.

In the 2007 parliamentary election, the leader on the SDPK list was Omurbek Babanov, but due to a scandal with his Kazakh citizenship, he was unable to receive a mandate and handed it over to Roza Otunbayeva. Following the election results, the SDPK became the largest opposition parliamentary party of the time. SDPK leaders Otunbayeva and Atambayev led the Second Kyrgyz Revolution in 2010. On 7 April 2010, Otunbayeva was proclaimed head of the transitional administration of Kyrgyzstan.

=== In government ===
The SDPK received the votes of 8% of eligible voters in the 2010 parliamentary elections, giving it 26 of 120 seats in parliament. This result made the party the second of five parties to surpass the support threshold of 5% of eligible voters necessary to enter parliament. The party won a plurality 38 of 120 seats in the 2015 parliamentary elections. In 2017, its presidential candidate, Sooronbay Jeenbekov, won the presidential election with 54% of the vote.

In June 2018, the party was admitted into the Socialist International as a full member.

=== Split and collapse ===
In March 2019, several party members aligned with former President Almazbek Atambayev and the government coalition over a widening rift with President Sooronbay Jeenbekov. Originally seen as Atambayev's hand-picked successor, Jeenbekov dismissed of most of the members associated with Atambayev's government when he was elected president and began investigations into possible corrupt practices by his predecessor. Several other members of the SDPK left following a 26 May session of the political council.

== Ideology ==
In the party program of 1994, the main principles of activity were the principles of democratic socialism, the introduction of political, economic and social democracy in all spheres of society. The SDPK also named state regulation of market relations as the most important principle of its economic policy. In its program, the party proposed to continue lending to small businesses, ensure low interest rates on loans, continue the state's implementation of projects to develop entrepreneurship, ensure the creation of free economic zones, and increase responsibility for unjustified inspections of businesses by fiscal and law enforcement agencies. The SDPK program proposed to transform the country from an exporter to an importer of labor resources.

== Election results ==
=== Presidential elections ===
Election	Candidate	First round			Second round		Result
Election	Candidate	Votes	%	Rank	Votes	%	Result
2000	Almazbek Atambayev	117,658	6.15%	3rd			Lost
2005	Almazbek Atambayev	Withdrawn his candidacy					Lost
2009	Almazbek Atambayev	195,291	8.50%	2nd			Lost
2011	Almazbek Atambayev	1,161,929	63.83%	1st			Won
2017	Sooronbay Jeenbekov	920,620	54.67%	1st			Won

=== Parliamentary elections ===
Election	Leader	Votes	%	Seats	+/–	Rank	Government
1995	Almazbek Atambayev	n/a	13.3	14 / 105	–	▲1st	Support
2000	Abdygany Erkebayev	306,239	19.76 (UDF)	12 / 105	▼2	1st	Support
2005	Abdygany Erkebayev	n/a	n/a	1 / 75	▼11	▼4th	Opposition
2007	Omurbek Babanov	188,585	9.35	11 / 90	▲10	▲2nd	Opposition
2010	Almazbek Atambayev	237,634	14.69	26 / 120	▲15	2nd	Government
2015	Chynybay Tursunbekov	431,771	27.40	38 / 120	▲12	▲1st	Government

== Membership ==
As of April 2019, according to SDPK, its ranks include about 40,000 in Kyrgyzstan and abroad.

== Notable members ==
- Almazbek Atambayev (until March 2019)
- Roza Otunbayeva (until 21 May 2010)
- Sooronbay Jeenbekov
- Bakyt Beshimov
- Isa Omurkulov
- Mirbek Asanakunov (Russian: Мирбек Асанакунов) governor of Issyk-Kul Region from 2010 through 2011
- Asel Koduranova (Асел Кодуранова) MP since 2015
- Asilbek Jeenbekov
- Kubanychbek Kadyrov
- Irina Karamushkina (Ирина Карамушкина) MP from 2010 to 2015
- Damira Niyazalieva
- Ruslan Shabatoev
