= 2015 Kyrgyz parliamentary election =

- 4 October 2015
- All 120 seats in the Supreme Council; 61 seats needed for a majority
- Turnout: 58.89% (▼2.11pp)
Party	Leader	Vote %	Seats	+/–
SDPK	Chynybai Tursunbekov	27.40	38	+12
Respublika–Ata Zhurt	Ömürbek Babanov	20.08	28	−23
Kyrgyzstan	Kanatbek Isaev	12.91	18	New
Onuguu–Progress	Bakyt Torobayev	9.30	13	New
Bir Bol	Altynbek Sulaymanov	8.49	12	New
Ata-Meken	Omurbek Tekebayev	7.75	11	−7
This lists parties that won seats. See the complete results below.
Results by region
Prime Minister before	Prime Minister after
Temir Sariyev; Akshumkar	Sooronbay Jeenbekov; SDPK

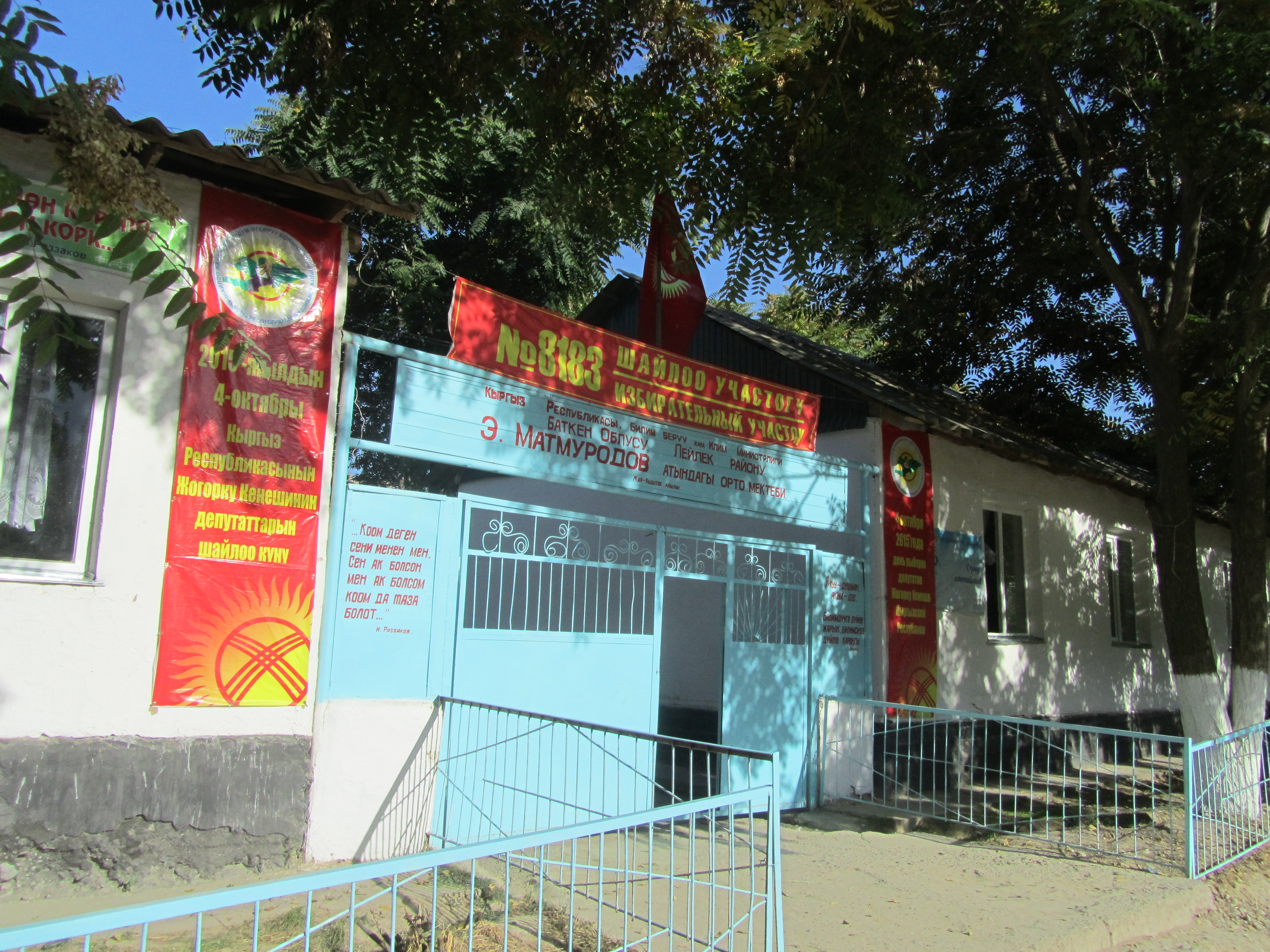
A school building being used as a polling place during the 2015 election

Parliamentary elections were held in Kyrgyzstan on 4 October 2015.

== Electoral system ==
The 120 seats in the Supreme Council were elected by proportional representation in a single nationwide constituency, with an electoral threshold of 7% at the national level, with an additional requirement for parties to receive at least 0.7% of the vote in each of the nine provinces to win seats. No party was allowed to win more than 65 seats. Party lists were required to have at least 30% of the candidates from each gender and every fourth candidate had to be of a different gender. Each list was also required to have at least 15% of its candidates from ethnic minorities.

Biometric voter registration was introduced following claims of vote rigging in previous elections.

== Campaign ==
Several political parties were formed in the run-up to the elections, often as an attempt by wealthy Kyrgyz to further their own interests. Incumbent Prime Minister Temir Sariyev claimed that places on party lists were sold to bidders, with rumours circulating that a high place on a party's list cost between $500,000 and £1,000,000.

Over 10% of prospective candidates were prevented from running due to criminal convictions, whilst one party's leader, a former boxer, was banned after it was claimed they beat up a rival candidate.

== Conduct ==
Although there were some reports of voter fraud, the OSCE mission stated that the elections had been "lively and competitive" and "unique in this region", whilst the PACE mission stated that voters had "made their choice freely among a large number of contestants."

However, the OSCE noted problems with the biometric voter registration, with many people not having registered in time to receive their ID cards. The Council of Europe raised concerns regarding transparency of campaigns and party financing, stating that it should be improved.

== Results ==
Party	Votes	%	Seats	+/–
Social Democratic Party	431,771	27.40	38	+12
Respublika–Ata Zhurt	316,372	20.08	28	–23
Kyrgyzstan Party	203,383	12.91	18	New
Onuguu–Progress	146,475	9.30	13	New
Bir Bol	133,800	8.49	12	New
Ata Meken Socialist Party	122,152	7.75	11	–7
United Kyrgyzstan–Emgek	96,751	6.14	0	0
Zamandash	43,039	2.73	0	0
Uluu Kyrgyzstan	23,676	1.50	0	New
Ar-Namys	12,496	0.79	0	–25
Meken Yntymagy	12,479	0.79	0	New
Congress of the Peoples of Kyrgyzstan	9,481	0.60	0	New
Aalam	6,328	0.40	0	New
Azattyk	5,253	0.33	0	New
Against all	12,295	0.78	–	–
Total	1,575,751	100.00	120	0
Valid votes	1,575,751	98.27		
Invalid/blank votes	27,762	1.73		
Total votes	1,603,513	100.00		
Registered voters/turnout	2,761,297	58.07		
Source: CEC
