= 2025 Kyrgyz parliamentary election =

- 30 November 2025
- All 90 seats in the Supreme Council; 46 seats needed for a majority
- Turnout: 36.40% (▲1.79pp)
Party	Leader	Vote %	Seats	+/–
Yntymak	Chingiz Makeshov	2.72	3	−6
Independents	—	95.18	84	+51
This lists parties that won seats. See the complete results below.
Speaker of the Supreme Council before	Speaker of the Supreme Council after
Nurlanbek Turgunbek uulu Mekenchil	Nurlanbek Turgunbek uulu Mekenchil

Snap parliamentary elections were held in Kyrgyzstan on 30 November 2025 to elect members of the Supreme Council, following the self-dissolution of parliament in September 2025. The parliamentary elections were initially planned for November 2026 under the regular electoral calendar.

Candidates loyal to President Sadyr Japarov won a dominant majority in the Supreme Council. OSCE described the elections as efficiently run but that the crackdown on independent media and a lack of transparency limited choice place which stifled public engagement. According to Eurasianet the elections went smoothly with little sign of fraud, violence or direct government meddling with the most notable controversy being the disqualification of the Social Democrats. Nurlanbek Turgunbek uulu was re-elected as speaker of the Supreme Council.

== Background ==
The Supreme Council of Kyrgyzstan (Jogorku Kenesh), the country's unicameral parliament, was elected in November 2021 following the annulment of the 2020 parliamentary elections and the resignation of President Sooronbay Jeenbekov. These elections were the first conducted under constitutional amendments adopted earlier in 2021, which strengthened presidential powers and reduced parliamentary authority. The legislature consisted of 90 deputies, elected through a mixed-member majoritarian representation.

In 2024, the government implemented major administrative-territorial reforms, redefining the boundaries of rural municipalities (aiyl aimaks) and cities, reorganizing local councils, and clarifying the competencies of local authorities. Observers noted that these reforms created a misalignment between parliamentary representation and the newly structured administrative units.

The political situation in the country under President Sadyr Japarov has been described as "stifled" and "increasingly restricted".

=== Constitutional changes and snap election speculations ===
Speculation about early parliamentary elections began in early 2025. In February, Speaker Nurlanbek Turgunbek uulu dismissed rumors of early voting, confirming that both parliamentary and presidential elections would follow their constitutionally scheduled dates. In April 2025, parliament approved a constitutional amendment moving the next presidential election to January 2027, separating it from the parliamentary elections originally scheduled for November 2026. Officials, including Deputy Chairman of the Cabinet of Ministers Edil Baisalov, emphasized that no early elections were planned at that time.

On 2 July 2025, President Sadyr Japarov made an unannounced working visit to Moscow to meet with Russian President Vladimir Putin, ostensibly to discuss bilateral issues and migration concerns. That trip prompted speculation that Japarov may also have been seeking tacit support from Russia for early parliamentary elections, given forecasts that such elections could occur ahead of the 2026 schedule. Japarov publicly denied those claims, stating electoral timing is a purely internal matter.

=== Parliamentary dissolution ===
By mid-September 2025, a group of deputies initiated a proposal for early self-dissolution of the Supreme Council. The initiative reportedly began around 15 September 2025 and gathered the 32 signatures required to trigger parliamentary consideration, with Speaker Nurlanbek Turgunbek uulu confirming receipt of the 32-deputy proposal and noted that its arguments were reasonable. The initiative group emphasized that holding the parliamentary elections alongside the presidential election in January 2027 would overburden the Central Election Commission and create logistical challenges.

On 23 September 2025, the Committee on Constitutional Legislation, State Structure, Judicial and Legal Issues, and Rules of Procedure approved the proposal. By this time, debate over early dissolution had intensified. Central Election Commission (CEC) chairman Tynchynbek Shainazarov stated that the CEC was technically prepared to administer early elections should parliament adopt a decision on self-dissolution, emphasizing that the proximity of the 2026–2027 electoral cycle could create overlap and legal disputes.

The proposal generated debate among deputies. Alliance faction leader Janar Akayev supported early dissolution, citing electoral administration concerns and the need to align parliamentary representation with the restructured administrative units. Other deputies, including Cholpon Sultanbekova, endorsed the measure to ensure the legislature reflected recent reforms. Critics, such as Iskhak Masaliev, argued that the initiative could indicate presidential influence and risk the independence of parliament.

On 24 September 2025, the 7th convocation of the Supreme Council unanimously voted to dissolve itself for the first time in Kyrgyzstan's history. Out of 90 registered deputies, 89 attended the session, and 84 voted in favor, with no opposition. Turgunbek uulu confirmed the deputies acted independently and that the parliament would retain its powers until the next convocation. According to law, the president must call early elections within five days. On 30 September 2025, President Sadyr Japarov signed a decree setting the parliamentary elections for 30 November 2025, stating the decision was intended to maintain political stability, prevent overlap of electoral cycles, and provide the CEC adequate time to prepare, while assuring supervision of a fair and transparent vote.

== Electoral system ==
Under 2025 amendments to Constitutional Law "On Elections of the President of the Kyrgyz Republic and Deputies of the Jogorku Kenesh", Kyrgyzstan replaced its previous mixed electoral system with a new majoritarian representation framework. The Supreme Council will continue to consist of 90 deputies, but they will now be elected from 30 multi-member districts, each returning three representatives by SNTV: each voter has one vote and the top three are elected, provided there is at least one man and one woman elected. This change abolished the earlier arrangement of electing deputies partly through open party-list proportional representation on a nationwide constituency and partly through single-member districts using first-past-the-post voting.

The reform was intended to simplify the voting process, harmonize parliamentary representation with ongoing administrative–territorial reforms, and reduce the disparity between deputies elected by party lists and those elected in electoral districts. Independent candidates may compete alongside party nominees, giving voters the option to choose either party-affiliated or non-party candidates within their district.

=== Constituencies ===
In March 2025, the CEC began the process of setting the boundaries based on proposals from local authorities, with constituencies averaging around 140,000 voters. If a deputy's mandate becomes vacant, the seat is filled by the candidate with the next highest number of votes in that constituency.

On 1 October 2025, the CEC approved the schemes and boundaries of the constituencies for the 2025 parliamentary elections as follows:

Region	Number of constituencies	Seats	Main constituency centers
Batken Region	3	9	Razzakov, Kadamjai, Kyzyl-Kiya
Osh Region and Osh	7	21	Nookat, Aravan, Osh, Kara-Suu, Gulcho, Uzgen, Kara-Kulja
Jalal-Abad Region	5	15	Manas, Suzak, Masy, Toktogul, Kerben
Talas Region	2	6	Talas, Kara-Balta
Chui Region and Bishkek	7	21	Bishkek (No. 21–24), Lebedinovka, Kant, Tokmak
Issyk-Kul and Naryn Region	6	18	Cholpon-Ata, Kyzyl-Suu, Kochkor, Naryn
Total	30	90	—

== Parties ==
=== Parliamentary parties ===
The table below presents the political party factions represented in the 7th convocation of the Supreme Council of Kyrgyzstan before its dissolution.

Name		Ideology	Position	Leader(s)	2021 result		Seats at dissolution
Name		Ideology	Position	Leader(s)	Votes (%)	Seats	Seats at dissolution
AJK	Ata-Jurt Kyrgyzstan	Kyrgyz nationalism	Right-wing	Aibek Matkerimov	19.07%	15 / 90	20 / 90
Mekenchil	Mekenchil	Right-wing populism	Right-wing	Kamchybek Tashiev	DNP		16 / 90
Ishenim	Ishenim	Communitarianism	Centre-right	Azamat Doroyev	15.03%	12 / 90	12 / 90
Yntymak	Yntymak	Social conservatism	Centre-right	Chingis Makeshov	12.13%	9 / 90	9 / 90
Alliance	Alliance	Populism	Centre to centre-left	Mirlan Jeenchoroyev	9.19%	8 / 90	9 / 90
BK	United Kyrgyzstan	National conservatism	Centre-right to right-wing	Adakhan Madumarov	7.77%	5 / 90	5 / 90
YN	Light of Faith	Islamic democracy	Centre-right	Nurzhigit Kadyrbekov	6.78%	5 / 90	5 / 90
SD	Social Democrats	Social democracy	Centre-left	Temirlan Sultanbekov	3.51%	1 / 90	1 / 90

=== Contesting parties ===
As of 9 October 2025, three political parties — Legalize, Kyrk Uuz, and Yntymak — have officially submitted applications to the CEC to participate in the parliamentary elections. On 22 October 2025, the CEC accepted the withdrawal of the Kyrk Uuz party from the race and annulled the registration of its authorized representatives.

Name		Ideology	Position	Leader(s)	2021 result	
Name		Ideology	Position	Leader(s)	Votes (%)	Seats
Yntymak	Yntymak	Social conservatism	Centre-right	Chingis Makeshov	12.13%	9 / 90

=== Disqualification of the Social Democrats ===
In November 2024, the Sverdlovsk District Court of Bishkek placed Social Democrats party leader Temirlan Sultanbekov and party members Irina Karamushkina and Roza Turksever in pre-trial detention on charges of vote buying during the 2024 Bishkek City Council elections. Following the investigation by the Investigative Service of the Bishkek City Department of Internal Affairs, the Bishkek City Court in April 2025 upheld their convictions, sentencing them to three years of probation and ordering 12 million soms in compensation to victims, along with the confiscation of property.

As a result of the ruling, the Bishkek City Court, on 15 October 2025, upheld the earlier verdict, thereby barring the Social Democrats party from participating in the 2025 parliamentary elections. Temirlan Sultanbekov denounced the decision as politically motivated and announced plans to appeal to the Supreme Court, calling the case an attempt to exclude his party from the electoral process.

== Timeline ==
On 30 September 2025, after the decree of President Sadyr Japarov setting the date for early elections, the Central Election Commission approved the Calendar Plan for the organization and conduct of the early elections of deputies of the Jogorku Kenesh of the Kyrgyz Republic, as follows:

Timeline of the 2025 Kyrgyz parliamentary election

Date	Event description
By 5 October 2025	Formation and approval of schemes and boundaries of electoral districts
After formation of districts	Formation of district election commissions
Following district commissions	Formation of polling stations abroad, based on suggestions from the Ministry of Foreign Affairs
By 14 October 2025	Posting of preliminary voter lists in polling stations for review by voters
8 October – 14 November 2025	Acceptance of applications for correction or clarification of voter list data
By 10 November 2025	Posting of voter control lists in polling stations for review
By 25 November 2025	Posting of final voter lists in polling stations
Within 3 days after election announcement	Political parties submit written notification of participation in elections to the CEC

Date	Event description
By 30 October 2025	Nomination of candidates in multi-member constituencies
By 2 November 2025, 18:00	Submission of documents for registration of candidates
By 10 November 2025	Registration of candidates for deputies of the Jogorku Kenesh
10 – 29 November 2025	Election campaigning
By 28 November 2025	Acceptance of applications from voters to vote outside their assigned polling station (remote voting)
On 30 November 2025, 08:00 – 20:00	Voting for deputies of the Jogorku Kenesh
By 14 December 2025	Determination and announcement of election results

== Conduct ==
=== Voter registration ===
As of 29 September 2025, the Central Election Commission reported that 4,237,000 citizens were registered as eligible voters in Kyrgyzstan. According to Deputy Chairperson Aidana Zhupueva, the distribution of the electorate will be carried out across 30 constituencies, each comprising on average about 140,000 voters, with a permitted deviation of up to 20%.

=== Voting technologies ===
Since 2015, Kyrgyzstan has been among the first states in the region to introduce digital technologies into the electoral process. That year, biometric identification of voters and automatic ballot boxes were implemented, with more than 700 international observers following the process. In 2025, the CEC announced the use of a new "5-in-1" technological complex, developed in cooperation with suppliers from South Korea. The system combines biometric identification by passports, video surveillance in polling stations, and automated processing of data. Officials emphasized that this system reduces costs, accelerates voter identification, and increases transparency of elections.

=== Remote voting and identification system ===
Amendments to the Kyrgyz electoral law, introduced the mechanism of online identification for remote voting. Under this system, citizens may vote at a polling station outside their home district, with their ballot being counted in the constituency of permanent registration. The reform was presented as a measure to facilitate participation of internal migrants and Kyrgyz citizens temporarily or permanently abroad. In September 2025, the CEC carried out pilot testing of the system in Batken Region and reported that it had functioned successfully.

=== Campaign regulations ===
Under the same amendments, requirements for parliamentary candidates were tightened. Candidates for the Supreme Council must demonstrate knowledge of the Kyrgyz language, although the precise level of proficiency and certification procedures are still to be defined by the government. Citizens with criminal records that were annulled through statute of limitations, reconciliation of the parties, or restitution of damages remain ineligible to run.

In addition, the electoral deposit for candidates was raised to 300,000 soms, while the maximum campaign fund for party lists was increased to 20 million soms. The CEC reiterated that in multi-member constituencies, each voter may support only one candidate, a principle summarized as "one voter — one candidate — one vote". The Commission has also issued warnings against vote buying, controlled voting, and fraudulent agitators, noting that law enforcement bodies cooperate by monitoring campaign activities to safeguard public order.

=== Funding ===
The CEC approved a budget of 700 million soms for the electoral organization. Of this, 382.7 million soms were allocated for CEC operational needs, including equipment, training, and remuneration; 259.2 million soms for district election commissions; and 58 million soms for organizing overseas voting. In total, over 25,000 participants, including members of 2,622 precinct and 30 district commissions, will be involved in the electoral process.

== Results ==
The Central Election Commission reported that voter turnout was 36.9%. According to preliminary results, 50 MPs from the previous parliament were re-elected. The rest of the seats were won by various entrepreneurs, business owners, and government officials. Seats won by women increased to 30 up from 20 in the last parliament, the minimum under the quota rules.

In the 13th district the results were annulled and all candidates who participated were barred from participating in a new election.

Party	Votes	%	Seats
Yntymak	40,260	2.72	3
Independent	1,408,785	95.18	84
Against all	31,097	2.10	–
Cancelled			3
Total	1,480,142	100.00	90
Valid votes	1,480,142	98.35	
Invalid/blank votes	24,846	1.65	
Total votes	1,504,988	100.00	
Registered voters/turnout	4,134,144	36.40	
Source: Shailoo

=== By constituency ===
Results by constituency

District 1
Candidate	Party	Votes	%
Chyngyz Ilyaskojoevich Ajibaev	Independent	10,476	18.18
Ismanali Egemberdievich Joroev	Independent	8,715	15.12
Abdikasit Abdulakimovich Isaev	Independent	5,643	9.79
Kamila Abdyrazakovna Talieva	Independent	5,377	9.33
Asel Burkhanovna Nabieva	Independent	3,542	6.15
Ashirbay Bapovich Jusupov	Independent	3,243	5.63
Mirgul Omurzakovna Temirbaeva	Independent	3,185	5.53
Kanatbek Abdurashidovich Akhmedov	Independent	2,988	5.19
Aygül Abdisalamovna Aydarova	Independent	2,763	4.79
Maksatbek Dyykanovich Dyykanov	Independent	2,426	4.21
Mirlan Konurovich Tagaev	Independent	2,219	3.85
Baktyar Abdinabievich Toktorov	Independent	2,018	3.50
Alikhan Uraymovich Uraymov	Independent	1,557	2.70
Kenjebek Salimbekovich Salimbekov	Independent	1,056	1.83
Zaripbek Kabylbaevich Kalandarov	Independent	843	1.46
Junusbek Abdirashitovich Karazakov	Independent	625	1.08
Sayragül Sadykovna Duulatova	Independent	412	0.71
Against all		538	0.93
Total		57,626	100.00
Valid votes		57,626	98.82
Invalid/blank votes		689	1.18
Total votes		58,315	100.00
Registered voters/turnout		136,175	42.82
Source: Shailoo

District 2
Candidate	Party	Votes	%
Yrysbek Yslamovich Atajanov	Independent	13,794	23.59
Baktyar Alievich Kalpaev	Independent	6,981	11.94
Burun Kushbekovna Amanova	Independent	5,078	8.69
Abdisatar Saytalyevich Sadykov	Independent	4,547	7.78
Begali Pirmamatovich Tölömüshov	Independent	4,391	7.51
Kanybek Toktomatovich Ganyev	Independent	4,299	7.35
Jumabek Abdipatta uulu	Independent	3,770	6.45
Syuita Kamalidinovna Akhmatova	Independent	3,484	5.96
Aytbay Ergeshovich Nadirbekov	Independent	3,466	5.93
Cholpon Aalyevna Sultanbekova	Independent	3,052	5.22
Azamat Asattulaevich Absattarov	Independent	2,302	3.94
Chyndykbek Seydakmatovich Saydimarov	Independent	1,245	2.13
Elmira Israelovna Askarova	Independent	1,202	2.06
Raykhan Abdullaeva	Independent	334	0.57
Against all		520	0.89
Total		58,465	100.00
Valid votes		58,465	98.81
Invalid/blank votes		707	1.19
Total votes		59,172	100.00
Registered voters/turnout		144,594	40.92
Source: Shailoo

District 3
Candidate	Party	Votes	%
Ravshanbek Rysbaevich Rysbaev	Independent	10,440	19.27
Janybek Jenishbekovich Amatov	Independent	5,850	10.80
Akylbek Arapbaevich Shamaev	Independent	5,835	10.77
Saidbek Meyrajdinovich Zulpuev	Independent	4,640	8.56
Akram Kambaralievich Madumarov	Independent	4,583	8.46
Makhabat Ergeshovna Mavlyanova	Independent	3,953	7.30
Asilbek Jorobaevich Matkalykov	Independent	3,947	7.28
Jyrgalbek Sagynbaevich Kalmatov	Independent	3,814	7.04
Bekmurza Abdulazizovich Berdibekov	Independent	2,332	4.30
Damira Djamaldinovna Matosmonova	Independent	2,164	3.99
Abduvali Arzybekovich Arzybekov	Independent	1,671	3.08
Maksatbek Mamatjanovich Toygonbaev	Independent	1,420	2.62
Baktyar Nazarovich Musaev	Independent	1,362	2.51
Bakytbek Turdalievich Matraimov	Independent	961	1.77
Gulnara Kachybekovna Duvanaeva	Independent	546	1.01
Aytolkun Shakirbekovna Boronova	Independent	319	0.59
Against all		347	0.64
Total		54,184	100.00
Valid votes		54,184	98.85
Invalid/blank votes		628	1.15
Total votes		54,812	100.00
Registered voters/turnout		136,562	40.14
Source: Shailoo

District 4
Candidate	Party	Votes	%
Sovetbek Rustambek uulu	Independent	11,899	20.35
Ulanbek Korgonbaevich Jaanbaev	Independent	9,996	17.09
Shabdanbek Kamalidinovich Amiraliev	Independent	9,048	15.47
Artykbay Turabidinovich Abdivaliev	Independent	7,827	13.38
Nilufar Yakubjanovna Alimjanova	Independent	4,264	7.29
Nurbek Ilyazbaevich Ilyazbaev	Independent	3,153	5.39
Elnara Abduvalievna Madmarova	Independent	3,060	5.23
Akhmedjan Mamadumarov	Independent	2,986	5.11
Manarbek Baytokovich Esenbaev	Independent	2,941	5.03
Nadira Azimovna Narmatova	Independent	2,278	3.90
Aygul Batyrbekovna Orozalieva	Independent	758	1.30
Against all		273	0.47
Total		58,483	100.00
Valid votes		58,483	98.80
Invalid/blank votes		710	1.20
Total votes		59,193	100.00
Registered voters/turnout		128,343	46.12
Source: Shailoo

District 5
Candidate	Party	Votes	%
Eldar Nurlanovich Sulaymanov	Independent	18,789	36.66
Azamat Almazbekovich Isirailov	Independent	9,248	18.04
Aygul Abdilkhaevna Akhmedova	Independent	5,225	10.19
Azizbek Ashimjanovich Abdullaev	Independent	3,763	7.34
Kurbanbek Gayypbekovich Aytibaev	Independent	3,678	7.18
Bagdadgul Melikozievna Mamatalieva	Independent	1,780	3.47
Salima Ergeshovna Sultanova	Independent	1,723	3.36
Zarema Murzajigit kyzy	Independent	1,183	2.31
Aynuru Toichievna Altybaeva	Independent	1,057	2.06
Jamal Akkozevna Ormonova	Independent	908	1.77
Gulnaz Nazarbaevna Isaeva	Independent	834	1.63
Dilbar Zulpuevna Kamilova	Independent	756	1.48
Elmira Mamateminovna Berdikulova	Independent	559	1.09
Jipargul Mukhtarovna Bargibaeva	Independent	286	0.56
Against all		1,463	2.85
Total		51,252	100.00
Valid votes		51,252	98.24
Invalid/blank votes		920	1.76
Total votes		52,172	100.00
Registered voters/turnout		164,881	31.64
Source: Shailoo

District 6
Candidate	Party	Votes	%
Altynbek Musajanovich Kudayberdiev	Independent	13,826	26.78
Bekmurza Askarbaevich Ergeshov	Independent	9,022	17.48
Nurbek Kaaryevich Alimbekov	Independent	8,773	17.00
Alymbek Zamirbekovich Omurzakov	Independent	4,103	7.95
Santalat Abdyldaevna Amanova	Independent	3,478	6.74
Ayjan Abdiganyevna Toguzakova	Independent	3,154	6.11
Gulnura Ganybaevna Satyvaldyeva	Independent	2,578	4.99
Kanzada Abdyldaevna Abdyldaeva	Independent	1,399	2.71
Gülnara Kaldarovna Kaldarova	Independent	1,182	2.29
Altynbek Turusbekovich Toktosunov	Independent	732	1.42
Bekbolot Oskonbaevich Arzibaev	Independent	618	1.20
Elnura Sabirjanovna Joroeva	Independent	524	1.02
Ilimbek Toktogulovich Osmonaliev	Independent	382	0.74
Venera Najimidinovna Sadykova	Independent	355	0.69
Against all		1,493	2.89
Total		51,619	100.00
Valid votes		51,619	98.47
Invalid/blank votes		804	1.53
Total votes		52,423	100.00
Registered voters/turnout		161,533	32.45
Source: Shailoo

District 7
Candidate	Party	Votes	%
Alisher Abibillaevich Kozuev	Independent	20,672	41.45
Ilimbek Kubanychbekovich Kubanychbekov	Independent	7,711	15.46
Zamir Bayshovich Yusupov	Independent	5,461	10.95
Gülay Egenmazarovna Mashrapova	Independent	3,478	6.97
Gülbarchyn Tolonbaevna Chalova	Independent	2,757	5.53
Chynarkan Orozbaevna Ydyrysova	Independent	1,751	3.51
Guluipa Arstanbekovna Djeenbaeva	Independent	1,591	3.19
Avazkan Chynberdievna Ormonova	Independent	1,283	2.57
Stalbek Abibillaevich Makambaev	Independent	1,225	2.46
Aktilek Akyl uulu	Independent	1,152	2.31
Gulmira Nishanbaevna Attokurova	Independent	1,133	2.27
Tursunbay Bakir uulu	Independent	591	1.18
Cholpon Abdyldaevna Jeenbekova	Independent	499	1.00
Against all		571	1.14
Total		49,875	100.00
Valid votes		49,875	98.40
Invalid/blank votes		810	1.60
Total votes		50,685	100.00
Registered voters/turnout		141,414	35.84
Source: Shailoo

District 8
Candidate	Party	Votes	%
Janarbek Kubanychovich Akaev	Independent	13,856	24.33
Ulan Berdibaevich Primov	Independent	11,009	19.33
Taalaybek Nasirbekovich Sarybashov	Independent	8,796	15.44
Nurjamal Tursunalievna Torobekova	Independent	3,145	5.52
Akkulu Tagaevich Berdiev	Independent	2,981	5.23
Jyldyzkan Aytibaevna Djoldoshova	Independent	2,590	4.55
Zaynal Akhmatovich Baatyrkulov	Independent	2,369	4.16
Myrzabek Saryevich Toktorov	Independent	1,788	3.14
Raisa Ashinovna Kirgizova	Independent	1,786	3.14
Dinara Ashimovna Ashimova	Independent	1,680	2.95
Eliza Bakalbaevna Kalmamatova	Independent	1,077	1.89
Bekbolot Akimovich Madazimov	Independent	952	1.67
Gülasyl Burkanovna Sütüeva	Independent	814	1.43
Bödösh Amanbaevna Mamyrova	Independent	601	1.06
Dinara Nurkamilovna Zumaeva	Independent	522	0.92
Döölötbek Ulukbekovich Turganbaev	Independent	517	0.91
Nurkanbek Mamatovich Patiev	Independent	478	0.84
Beshbolush Jorobaevich Matisakov	Independent	475	0.83
Karamat Baltabaevna Toktorova	Independent	470	0.83
Ayzirek Semetey kyzy	Independent	256	0.45
Chynara Jumanazarovna Mamajakypova	Independent	224	0.39
Against all		566	0.99
Total		56,952	100.00
Valid votes		56,952	95.14
Invalid/blank votes		2,910	4.86
Total votes		59,862	100.00
Registered voters/turnout		142,474	42.02
Source: Shailoo

District 9
Candidate	Party	Votes	%
Azamjan Abdullajanovich Djalilov	Independent	5,461	13.28
Daniyar Ermekovich Tolonov	Independent	5,088	12.37
Nurlanbek Janybekovich Saipbaev	Independent	4,353	10.58
Jenishbek Esenalievich Abitov	Independent	4,257	10.35
Chyngyz Bazarbaevich Talipov	Independent	3,785	9.20
Ernis Mukashbekovich Toltoev	Independent	3,286	7.99
Bayysh Erkebaevich Jumaev	Independent	3,024	7.35
Kylychbek Mutalievich Akaev	Independent	2,574	6.26
Kubanychbek Abyltaevich Kantoroev	Independent	1,176	2.86
Jyldyz Abdyldaevna Egenberdieva	Independent	1,127	2.74
Yrgal Karmyshakovna Kadyralieva	Independent	1,099	2.67
Gulnarakhan Djumakovna Erkinbaeva	Independent	984	2.39
Gulmira Mamaevna Turdubaeva	Independent	964	2.34
Uultay Amalbekovna Abjaparova	Independent	785	1.91
Akhunov Sardarbek Ismailjanovich Daut	Independent	571	1.39
Gulperi Abdyldaevna Toktomuratova	Independent	500	1.22
Boronbay Baitovich Umarbekov	Independent	459	1.12
Tashkhon Temirovna Batyrova	Independent	439	1.07
Nursultan Akylbek	Independent	294	0.71
Jyldyzkan Turumbekovna Kadyrova	Independent	228	0.55
Syymykbek Baltakhunovich Nurunbetov	Independent	126	0.31
Against all		557	1.35
Total		41,137	100.00
Valid votes		41,137	98.41
Invalid/blank votes		663	1.59
Total votes		41,800	100.00
Registered voters/turnout		123,213	33.92
Source: Shailoo

District 10
Candidate	Party	Votes	%
Kurmankul Toktoralevich Zulushev	Independent	14,688	23.50
Suyunbek Abdyldaevich Omurzakov	Independent	7,637	12.22
Ulugbek Zulpukarovich Ormonov	Independent	6,735	10.78
Shükürbek Mamazakirovich Erkebaev	Independent	4,930	7.89
Bolotbek Jusupovich Dyykanbaev	Independent	4,911	7.86
Azret Ali Akylbekovich Attokurov	Independent	4,288	6.86
Aaly Azimovich Karashev	Independent	3,663	5.86
Gülnara Marishovna Baatirova	Independent	3,506	5.61
Nurkyz Kadyrbek kyzy	Independent	3,202	5.12
Talantbek Esenbay uulu	Independent	2,976	4.76
Orozayym Kockonbaevna Narmatova	Independent	1,582	2.53
Jyrgalbek Alimbaevich Samatov	Independent	1,188	1.90
Damirbek Ermekbaevich Kydyrshaev	Independent	1,093	1.75
Gulbu Chalovna Shaltakova	Independent	789	1.26
Artur Jyldyzbekovich Bakirov	Independent	628	1.00
Nurzida Ababakirovna Kasymova	Independent	403	0.64
Against all		284	0.45
Total		62,503	100.00
Valid votes		62,503	99.00
Invalid/blank votes		634	1.00
Total votes		63,137	100.00
Registered voters/turnout		136,685	46.19
Source: Shailoo

District 11
Candidate	Party	Votes	%
Shairbek Kydyrshaevich Tashiev	Independent	24,302	55.84
Altynbek Tairovich Kylychbaev	Independent	7,447	17.11
Venera Khamzaevna Salyamova	Independent	4,839	11.12
Mavlyuda Kalmamatovna Kalberdieva	Independent	4,605	10.58
Nurjamal Matisakovna Kamchibekova	Independent	1,219	2.80
Against all		1,105	2.54
Total		43,517	100.00
Valid votes		43,517	98.66
Invalid/blank votes		589	1.34
Total votes		44,106	100.00
Registered voters/turnout		155,495	28.36
Source: Shailoo

District 12
Candidate	Party	Votes	%
Bekmyrza Cholponbay uulu	Independent	16,335	27.44
Talaybek Aytmamatovich Masabirov	Independent	9,945	16.71
Toygonbay Jorobaevich Abdykarov	Independent	5,898	9.91
Bakytbek Samaganovich Mamatov	Independent	5,238	8.80
Temirbek Kyrgyzbaevich Tillebaev	Independent	4,085	6.86
Ermekbay Alyanovich Omoshev	Independent	2,563	4.31
Jyldyz Kochkoralievna Kurmanalieva	Independent	2,517	4.23
Avazbek Abdirakhmanovich Akbaev	Independent	2,199	3.69
Nurdin Manapovich Ermatov	Independent	2,179	3.66
Gülnaz Tajibaevna Jalilova	Independent	1,653	2.78
Meder Rakhman	Independent	1,202	2.02
Sulayman Turduevich Kayypov	Independent	1,135	1.91
Sanjarbek Arzykulovich Ennazarov	Independent	1,113	1.87
Kyzjibek Sovetovna Karabekova	Independent	833	1.40
Nurkan Kadyrovna Koychumanova	Independent	786	1.32
Gulmira Bekenovna Kambarova	Independent	564	0.95
Roza Ajimamatovna Sultanova	Independent	339	0.57
Zaynapkhan Baltabaevna Jusupova	Independent	254	0.43
Against all		686	1.15
Total		59,524	100.00
Valid votes		59,524	98.19
Invalid/blank votes		1,099	1.81
Total votes		60,623	100.00
Registered voters/turnout		154,553	39.22
Source: Shailoo

District 14
Candidate	Party	Votes	%
Bolotbek Ibraimovich Borbiev	Independent	13,445	24.92
Kunduzbek Koshalievich Sulaymanov	Independent	12,064	22.36
Rayimberdi Seydakmatovich Duyshenbiev	Independent	6,605	12.24
Gulsharkan Okonovna Kultaeva	Independent	6,415	11.89
Tamara Akimjanovna Mamytkanova	Independent	3,134	5.81
Mariyakan Tölögönovna Uturbaeva	Independent	2,810	5.21
Tattibübü Nurbekovna Ergeshbaeva	Independent	1,991	3.69
Nuraida Nurjakypovna Tolubaeva	Independent	1,873	3.47
Arno Tolobekovich Esenkulov	Independent	1,371	2.54
Jengishgül Moldokerimovna Japarova	Independent	1,292	2.39
Turdukan Abdykaryevna Jumabekova	Independent	1,232	2.28
Güljan Kalpakbaevna Berdimuratova	Independent	561	1.04
Against all		1,155	2.14
Total		53,948	100.00
Valid votes		53,948	98.92
Invalid/blank votes		588	1.08
Total votes		54,536	100.00
Registered voters/turnout		149,026	36.59
Source: Shailoo

District 15
Candidate	Party	Votes	%
Nurlanbek Turgunbek uulu	Independent	17,125	25.38
Azizbek Atakozuevich Tursunbaev	Independent	10,713	15.87
Alisher Tashbaevich Erbaev	Independent	8,179	12.12
Djayloobay Danibaevich Nyshanov	Independent	5,865	8.69
Turgunbek Narimanovich Narimanov	Independent	4,770	7.07
Aysarakan Nyshanovna Abdibaeva	Independent	3,988	5.91
Murataly Topchubaevich Kerimbaev	Independent	3,693	5.47
Bektemir Kudayberdievich Mamyraliev	Independent	2,692	3.99
Rada Muratalyevna Tumanbaeva	Independent	2,494	3.70
Adyl Umarovich Umarov	Independent	2,491	3.69
Rakhiya Rayymbekovna Önörbaeva	Independent	1,434	2.12
Mirgül Almanbetovna Eshbaeva	Independent	1,405	2.08
Zulayka Eshmatovna Kulbaeva	Independent	1,291	1.91
Saltanat Nyshanovna Abdibaeva	Independent	551	0.82
Mirlan Jumadilovich Myrzaev	Independent	259	0.38
Against all		537	0.80
Total		67,487	100.00
Valid votes		67,487	98.91
Invalid/blank votes		741	1.09
Total votes		68,228	100.00
Registered voters/turnout		160,200	42.59
Source: Shailoo

District 16
Candidate	Party	Votes	%
Dastanbek Artisbekovich Djumabekov	Independent	12,928	22.97
Meder Oskonbekovich Chotonov	Independent	10,164	18.06
Medina Kayrylbekovna Kayrylbekova	Yntymak	8,951	15.90
Ruslanbek Shergazievich Jakyshov	Independent	8,872	15.76
Marat Moldonovich Murataliev	Independent	5,005	8.89
Aziz Biymyrza uulu	Independent	3,816	6.78
Mirgül Rasul kyzy	Independent	2,662	4.73
Meerim Torebekovna Syydalieva	Independent	1,399	2.49
Adylbek Eshimbekovich Kapalov	Independent	1,275	2.27
Medetbek Rysbekovich Suyunbaev	Independent	546	0.97
Against all		667	1.19
Total		56,285	100.00
Valid votes		56,285	98.69
Invalid/blank votes		746	1.31
Total votes		57,031	100.00
Registered voters/turnout		133,744	42.64
Source: Shailoo

District 17
Candidate	Party	Votes	%
Nurlanbek Asanbekovich Azygaliev	Independent	12,020	25.26
Ulukbek Kamchibekovich Uzakbaev	Independent	10,766	22.63
Baktybek Kanybekovich Choybekov	Independent	8,026	16.87
Cholpon Zamirbekovna Esenamanova	Independent	4,714	9.91
Ayjan Adamkalievna Chynybaeva	Independent	3,943	8.29
Askat Ulanbekovich Asanaliev	Independent	1,717	3.61
Ernazar Muratbekovich Nurmukhamedov	Independent	1,284	2.70
Koysun Ablabekovna Kurmanalieva	Independent	1,182	2.48
Adilet Sabyrbekovich Kamchybekov	Independent	901	1.89
Yrys Sabyrbekovna Sabyrbekova	Independent	800	1.68
Jyldyz Ostemirovna Kasanalieva	Independent	683	1.44
Dastan Mayrambekovich Manamkulov	Independent	618	1.30
Against all		924	1.94
Total		47,578	100.00
Valid votes		47,578	96.38
Invalid/blank votes		1,785	3.62
Total votes		49,363	100.00
Registered voters/turnout		149,255	33.07
Source: Shailoo

District 18
Candidate	Party	Votes	%
Karim Lemzarovich Khandjeza	Independent	7,893	16.42
Bakyt Muratbekovich Chomoev	Independent	6,906	14.37
Erkin Kuvatbekovich Biybosunov	Independent	6,815	14.18
Guljan Erkinbekovna Satieva	Independent	5,142	10.70
Jenishbek Kubanychbekovich Edigeev	Independent	4,925	10.25
Leyla Khiyanovna Lurova	Yntymak	3,939	8.19
Azat Kubanychbekovich Oskombaev	Independent	3,473	7.23
Altynbek Djumabaevich Mambetaliev	Independent	2,617	5.44
Edik Omurzakovich Sartpaev	Independent	1,421	2.96
Munara Mamadjanova Mamadjanova	Independent	1,047	2.18
Talantbek Temirkhanovich Bodoshev	Independent	882	1.83
Elkinbek Toktogonovich Ashirbaev	Independent	631	1.31
Altynay Erkinbekovna Sultankulova	Independent	587	1.22
Damira Bayterekovna Biymyrsaeva	Independent	449	0.93
Manas Musadinovich Aydarov	Independent	303	0.63
Busurman Satybaldiev	Independent	113	0.24
Against all		924	1.92
Total		48,067	100.00
Valid votes		48,067	97.99
Invalid/blank votes		985	2.01
Total votes		49,052	100.00
Registered voters/turnout		140,104	35.01
Source: Shailoo

District 19
Candidate	Party	Votes	%
Mederbek Kubanychevich Aliev	Independent	5,532	13.09
Abdyldabek Joldoshalievich Egemberdiev	Independent	5,316	12.58
Ramis Mayrambekovich Djunusaliev	Independent	4,767	11.28
Ulan Almasbekovich Sariev	Independent	4,746	11.23
Amankan Batyrbekovich Kenjebaev	Independent	2,957	7.00
Baktybek Abdilashimovich Amanbaev	Independent	2,247	5.32
Taalaybek Tolonbaev	Independent	2,006	4.75
Stalbek Temirbekovich Akmatov	Independent	1,949	4.61
Edita Kanybekovna Taygaraeva	Independent	1,397	3.31
Rysgul Abdymanapovna Akimjanova	Independent	1,298	3.07
Ulan Bolotbekovich Astarkulov	Independent	1,048	2.48
Amanbay Toktorovich Omurzakov	Independent	994	2.35
Mirbek Lisbekovich Osmonov	Independent	926	2.19
Aselya Raimbekovna Ibraimova	Independent	750	1.78
Chyngyzbek Yrysbekovich Esenaliev	Independent	692	1.64
Vinera Kalybekovna Raimbachaeva	Independent	600	1.42
Erkinbek Musalievich Bayamanov	Independent	578	1.37
Gulzat Jumabaevna Isabekova	Independent	555	1.31
Gyulshat Kadyrovna Asylbaeva	Independent	460	1.09
Elmira Jusupbekovna Kenjeeva	Independent	432	1.02
Nurgul Emilkanovna Useinova	Independent	380	0.90
Akay Imaralievich Kydyrov	Independent	275	0.65
Kulira Idrisovna Kubatova	Independent	254	0.60
Nurjan Baytemirovna Nayzabekova	Independent	237	0.56
Niyazbek Bekjanovich Kulambaev	Independent	178	0.42
Against all		1,676	3.97
Total		42,250	100.00
Valid votes		42,250	98.61
Invalid/blank votes		595	1.39
Total votes		42,845	100.00
Registered voters/turnout		138,862	30.85
Source: Shailoo

District 20
Candidate	Party	Votes	%
Temirlan Tynychbekovich Aytiev	Independent	9,021	29.04
Seidbek Almazbekovich Atambaev	Independent	3,825	12.31
Maksat Djumakadyrovich Alymbekov	Yntymak	2,867	9.23
Altynbek Abdisalamovich Namazaliev	Independent	1,790	5.76
Taalaybek Jenishovich Kermaliev	Independent	1,727	5.56
Toktobübü Abasovna Ashymbaeva	Independent	1,249	4.02
Azamat Taalaybekovich Bolgonbaev	Independent	1,236	3.98
Oyatullo Nuralievich Mukhidinov	Independent	1,102	3.55
Bermet Kurmanbekovna Kurmanbekova	Independent	983	3.16
Sapar Planovich Tashmatov	Independent	974	3.14
Gulnara Adylovna Tashibekova	Independent	840	2.70
Gulmira Asankulovna Asekova	Independent	810	2.61
Abror Djononovich Razikov	Independent	800	2.58
Jangyl Ishenbekovna Alybaeva	Independent	564	1.82
Malika Bagdatovna Ibraimova	Independent	530	1.71
Asel Misirovna Abdygulova	Independent	523	1.68
Gulyaim Kudayberdievna Baytemirova	Independent	442	1.42
Against all		1,779	5.73
Total		31,062	100.00
Valid votes		31,062	98.29
Invalid/blank votes		540	1.71
Total votes		31,602	100.00
Registered voters/turnout		128,180	24.65
Source: Shailoo

District 21
Candidate	Party	Votes	%
Kuvanychbek Kambaralievich Kongantiev	Independent	13,379	33.73
Janybek Bolotbekovich Abirov	Independent	8,914	22.47
Chingiz Azamatovich Aydarbekov	Independent	6,259	15.78
Mirlan Kanatbekovich Jeenchoroev	Independent	3,324	8.38
Jyldyz Esenbekovna Sadyrbaeva	Independent	2,079	5.24
Beyshen Turgunbaevich Arbyshev	Independent	576	1.45
Gülsana Junusovna Bapaeva	Independent	479	1.21
Munarbek Abdukadyrovich Supataev	Independent	383	0.97
Dinmukhambet Dokturbekovich Satynbaev	Independent	374	0.94
Nurgul Janybekovna Chomoeva	Independent	341	0.86
Mariya Dulatovna Djaparkulova	Independent	296	0.75
Gulchekhra Taabaldievna Omonova	Independent	257	0.65
Kanatbek Tajibaev	Independent	214	0.54
Ulukmyrza Abdilashimovich Tootaev	Independent	188	0.47
Gülshat Alpamyshovna Tazabekova	Independent	166	0.42
Against all		2,435	6.14
Total		39,664	100.00
Valid votes		39,664	98.20
Invalid/blank votes		729	1.80
Total votes		40,393	100.00
Registered voters/turnout		139,403	28.98
Source: Shailoo

District 22
Candidate	Party	Votes	%
Dastan Dalabayevich Bekeshev	Independent	17,378	43.08
Bolot Adylbekovich Ibragimov	Independent	8,128	20.15
Elmir Akunalievich Dosaliev	Independent	6,071	15.05
Emilbek Myrzakulovich Abdykadyrov	Independent	3,704	9.18
Gulya Akmatkulovna Kojokulova	Independent	1,214	3.01
Aida Orozalievna Uzakova	Independent	904	2.24
Baktygül Imanbek kyzy	Yntymak	305	0.76
Samat Kanimetovich Kanimetov	Independent	265	0.66
Turatbek Abdilarisovich Musuraliev	Independent	260	0.64
Sagynbek Umetalievich Abdrakhmanov	Independent	257	0.64
Kubanychbek Ishenkadyrovich Abdrakhmanov	Independent	248	0.61
Irlan Azisovich Atanov	Independent	247	0.61
Venera Kubanychbekovna Osmonbetova	Independent	152	0.38
Khansyvar Rustamovich Bakshaliev	Independent	112	0.28
Akhmatali Sadyrbekovich Absaliev	Independent	96	0.24
Against all		998	2.47
Total		40,339	100.00
Valid votes		40,339	98.97
Invalid/blank votes		419	1.03
Total votes		40,758	100.00
Registered voters/turnout		136,100	29.95
Source: Shailoo

District 23
Candidate	Party	Votes	%
Elvira Jyrgalbekovna Surabaldieva	Independent	11,278	27.66
Marlen Abdyrakhmanovich Mamataliev	Yntymak	6,932	17.00
Umbetaly Toktoralievich Kydyraliev	Independent	6,448	15.81
Ilyaz Almazovich Chalov	Independent	5,841	14.32
Aida Isatbek kyzy	Independent	3,686	9.04
Ilim Mayrambekovich Karypbekov	Independent	2,430	5.96
Rinat Erkinbekovich Chekilov	Independent	937	2.30
Kanat Zerlikovich Khasanov	Independent	485	1.19
Mavlyan Amangeldievich Askarbekov	Independent	380	0.93
Satybek Kalilovich Moldaliev	Independent	322	0.79
Iskender Sherimbekovich Sharsheev	Independent	296	0.73
Damirbek Tayyrbekovich Davlyanov	Independent	209	0.51
Aliaskar Abdyldaevich Turgunbaev	Independent	183	0.45
Against all		1,349	3.31
Total		40,776	100.00
Valid votes		40,776	98.69
Invalid/blank votes		542	1.31
Total votes		41,318	100.00
Registered voters/turnout		132,442	31.20
Source: Shailoo

District 24
Candidate	Party	Votes	%
Jumabek Mamytbaevich Salymbekov	Independent	7,481	22.16
Ulukbek Karybek uulu	Independent	6,038	17.89
Arafat Saydakhmatovich Ismailov	Independent	5,595	16.58
Gulnara Orozbekovna Akimbaeva	Independent	3,505	10.38
Kazybek Kochkorovich Ergeshov	Yntymak	3,434	10.17
Shariypa Toktomatovna Moldalieva	Independent	1,757	5.21
Kyyal Aytbekovna Toktorbaeva	Independent	1,102	3.26
Jibek Zakirovna Sharapova	Independent	683	2.02
Daniyar Omurbekovich Ibraymakunov	Independent	486	1.44
Altynay Bolotovna Kulmambetova	Independent	325	0.96
Mayramkul Turgunbekovna Isaeva	Independent	324	0.96
Erjan Sulaymanovich Kayypov	Independent	305	0.90
Mirlan Kubatbekovich Orozbaev	Independent	288	0.85
Against all		2,432	7.20
Total		33,755	100.00
Valid votes		33,755	98.39
Invalid/blank votes		554	1.61
Total votes		34,309	100.00
Registered voters/turnout		134,994	25.42
Source: Shailoo

District 25
Candidate	Party	Votes	%
Bakhridin Valievich Shabazov	Independent	10,062	21.98
Bakyt Erkinovich Tentishev	Independent	7,108	15.53
Janybek Asanbekovich Asanbekov	Independent	3,990	8.72
Akbokon Dukenovich Tashtanbekov	Independent	3,511	7.67
Erkeayym Alymovna Seytkazieva	Independent	3,225	7.04
Jyldyzkan Zaynidinovna Jumalieva	Independent	2,609	5.70
Elnura Saydirakmanovna Alkanova	Independent	2,441	5.33
Natalya Vladimirovna Nikitenko	Independent	2,098	4.58
Erlis Djekshenovich Terdikbaev	Independent	2,041	4.46
Baktybek Sadyrovich Moldobaev	Independent	1,300	2.84
Akan Erikovich Imanov	Independent	1,295	2.83
Aliza Karypbekovna Soltonbekova	Independent	1,257	2.75
Bakytbek Cholponbekovich Kulmambetov	Independent	954	2.08
Minara Anarbekovna Sherikulova	Independent	750	1.64
Törökan Beyshenbekovich Junusbekov	Independent	445	0.97
Gulzar Kumarovna Moldokulova	Independent	444	0.97
Kanymbu Isirailovna Karabaeva	Independent	256	0.56
Against all		1,993	4.35
Total		45,779	100.00
Valid votes		45,779	98.17
Invalid/blank votes		853	1.83
Total votes		46,632	100.00
Registered voters/turnout		141,908	32.86
Source: Shailoo

District 26
Candidate	Party	Votes	%
Mederbek Djamankulovich Sakkaraev	Independent	11,978	22.70
Erkinbek Askeevich Isenaliev	Independent	11,265	21.35
Eldar Kurmanbekovich Abakirov	Independent	7,067	13.39
Djamilya Kubanychbekovna Isaeva	Independent	5,944	11.26
Alymkadyr Savirdinovich Beyshenaliev	Independent	5,784	10.96
Akjol Apsamatovich Isaev	Independent	1,689	3.20
Nurmukhamed Ashymbekovich Sydygaliev	Independent	1,382	2.62
Jarkin Abdylas	Independent	1,099	2.08
Aynura Almasbekovna Askarova	Independent	1,059	2.01
Aybek Kurmanovich Botobaev	Independent	978	1.85
Akylbek Ryskeldievich Mursaliev	Independent	886	1.68
Aysuluu Kurmanbaevna Aytimbetova	Independent	743	1.41
Gulniza Djumabekovna Beyshenbaeva	Independent	695	1.32
Gulnaz Sharshenalievna Kurmanalieva	Independent	271	0.51
Aybek Manasbekovich Subanov	Independent	266	0.50
Aygerim Shamilevna Boronchieva	Independent	172	0.33
Farkhat Aybekovich Kojomkulov	Independent	116	0.22
Against all		1,372	2.60
Total		52,766	100.00
Valid votes		52,766	96.00
Invalid/blank votes		2,200	4.00
Total votes		54,966	100.00
Registered voters/turnout		132,278	41.55
Source: Shailoo

District 27
Candidate	Party	Votes	%
Akylbek Toguzbaevich Tümönbaev	Independent	13,445	22.13
Tabyldy Muratbekovich Muratbekov	Independent	5,992	9.86
Gulkan Sakinovna Moldobekova	Independent	5,156	8.49
Kanybek Sultanovich Sultanov	Independent	4,510	7.42
Iskender Keneshbekovich Alymbekov	Independent	3,205	5.27
Altynay Joluchuevna Asankulova	Independent	3,000	4.94
Kanat Keneshovich Shabdanbaev	Independent	2,905	4.78
Elnura Stalikovna Alymbaeva	Independent	2,288	3.77
Taalaybek Karypovich Djailov	Independent	2,285	3.76
Jenishgul Avazovna Ozbekova	Independent	1,926	3.17
Asel Urusovna Derkimbaeva	Independent	1,837	3.02
Aizat Tynybekovna Isamatova	Independent	1,757	2.89
Talgat Chinybekovich Suranaliev	Independent	1,321	2.17
Alfira Iliyasovna Supataeva	Independent	1,319	2.17
Akjol Sabyrbekovich Ataev	Independent	1,247	2.05
Samat Turganbekovich Kachkynov	Independent	1,232	2.03
Tagir Taalaybekovich Taalaybekov	Independent	1,180	1.94
Rinat Saparbekovich Asakeev	Independent	1,161	1.91
Akylsayra Kadyralievna Djumabekova	Independent	1,004	1.65
Burul Tilekovna Namazova	Independent	926	1.52
Adilet Asanovich Merkanov	Independent	668	1.10
Gülbara Kadyrbekovna Abdykalikova	Independent	648	1.07
Baktybek Asanovich Asamudinov	Independent	270	0.44
Anar Sartbaevna Dubanbaeva	Independent	203	0.33
Against all		1,281	2.11
Total		60,766	100.00
Valid votes		60,766	98.86
Invalid/blank votes		699	1.14
Total votes		61,465	100.00
Registered voters/turnout		157,463	39.03
Source: Shailoo

District 28
Candidate	Party	Votes	%
Erulan Kalchoroevich Kokulov	Independent	11,619	20.35
Bolot Turusbekovich Sagynaev	Independent	9,254	16.21
Rakhat Myrzabekovna Junushbaeva	Independent	6,724	11.78
Azamat Kubanychbekovich Doroev	Independent	5,774	10.12
Muratbek Kubanychbekovich Ismailov	Independent	5,279	9.25
Balbak Zarlykovich Tülöbaev	Yntymak	4,297	7.53
Elmira Valentynovna Usenova	Independent	3,015	5.28
Aynur Samybekovna Omorova	Independent	1,911	3.35
Arslanbek Kasymakunovich Maliev	Independent	1,766	3.09
Samatbek Kulukeevich Ibraev	Independent	1,640	2.87
Meerim Kubanychbekovna Junushalieva	Independent	1,383	2.42
Nurlan Asylbekovich Ongoev	Independent	1,003	1.76
Akyl Kanatbekovich Kemelov	Independent	978	1.71
Munara Baysymakovna Abdymambetova	Independent	728	1.28
Jyldyz Jartyevna Asanakunova	Independent	624	1.09
Eraly Joldoshbekovich Joldoshbekov	Independent	220	0.39
Against all		867	1.52
Total		57,082	100.00
Valid votes		57,082	98.97
Invalid/blank votes		595	1.03
Total votes		57,677	100.00
Registered voters/turnout		160,044	36.04
Source: Shailoo

District 29
Candidate	Party	Votes	%
Nurbek Omurbekovich Sydygaliev	Independent	13,067	23.45
Adilet Cholponbekovich Belekov	Yntymak	9,535	17.11
Abtandil Ilduzovich Kulbarakov	Independent	6,789	12.18
Gülsünkan Ishengazievna Junushalieva	Independent	6,688	12.00
Ayjigit Kazakbaevich Tynaliev	Independent	5,471	9.82
Temirbolot Asanalievich Abykeev	Independent	5,133	9.21
Amankul Japarbekovich Toktomambetov	Independent	2,986	5.36
Askarbek Baktybekovich Kuruchbekov	Independent	1,905	3.42
Cholponbek Edilbekov	Independent	827	1.48
Altynkul Jeenbekovna Murzakimova	Independent	659	1.18
Madina Tashtanbekovna Tashtanbekova	Independent	541	0.97
Talantbek Jekshenovich Ibraev	Independent	505	0.91
Aizada Satarbekovna Esenkanova	Independent	265	0.48
Against all		1,363	2.45
Total		55,734	100.00
Valid votes		55,734	98.98
Invalid/blank votes		573	1.02
Total votes		56,307	100.00
Registered voters/turnout		137,758	40.87
Source: Shailoo

District 30
Candidate	Party	Votes	%
Kubanychbek Karganbekovich Samakov	Independent	13,333	21.62
Ulan Bolotbekovich Bakasov	Independent	11,411	18.50
Muradil Janyshbekovich Sydykov	Independent	10,422	16.90
Jyldyz Taalaybek kyzy	Independent	7,243	11.75
Mirlan Samykojo	Independent	5,724	9.28
Beyshenaly Nurdinov	Independent	2,474	4.01
Khanzada Isakovna Osmonalieva	Independent	2,383	3.86
Adylbek Beyshembaevich Abdykadyrov	Independent	2,164	3.51
Aybek Toktogonovich Jayloobaev	Independent	1,936	3.14
Mustafa Beyshebaevich Jumakanov	Independent	1,470	2.38
Yrysbübü Mukanbetovna Möndürbaeva	Independent	1,003	1.63
Chyngyz Kaparovich Kaparov	Independent	544	0.88
Aydana Myktybekovna Myktybekova	Independent	363	0.59
Yrysbek Kyrmanchievich Kulenbekov	Independent	255	0.41
Against all		942	1.53
Total		61,667	100.00
Valid votes		61,667	99.13
Invalid/blank votes		539	0.87
Total votes		62,206	100.00
Registered voters/turnout		136,461	45.59
Source: Shailoo
