= 7th Supreme Council of Kyrgyzstan =

Jogorku Kenesh of the Republic of Kyrgyzstan of the 7th convocation Кыргыз Республикасынын Жогорку Кеңеши 7-чакырылышы

History
- Founded: December 29, 2021
- Disbanded: September 25, 2025
- Preceded by: 6th Supreme Council
- Succeeded by: 8th Supreme Council

Leadership
- Speaker: Talant Mamytov (Ata-Jurt Kyrgyzstan); Nurlanbek Turgunbek uulu (Ata-Jurt Kyrgyzstan)

Structure
- Political groups: Majority (57): Ata-Jurt Kyrgyzstan (20); Mekenchil (16); Ishenim (12); Yntymak (9); Others (33): Eldik (9); Afghans' Party (1); Alliance (8); United Kyrgyzstan (5); Light of Faith (5); Independents (6); Social Democrats (1)

Elections
- Voting system: Mixed-member majoritarian (54 by party lists, 36 single-mandate)

Meeting place
- White House, Bishkek

The Jogorku Kenesh of the Republic of Kyrgyzstan of the 7th convocation (Kyrgyz: Кыргыз Республикасынын Жогорку Кеңеши 7-чакырылыш) was the convocation of the Parliament of the Republic of Kyrgyzstan, elected in the 2021 parliamentary election.

== History ==
On 29 December 2021, the new convocation officially began work. Talant Mamytov was re-elected Speaker of the Supreme Council.

On the same day, the deputy group "Eldik" was created by 13 single-mandate deputies.

On 5 October 2022 Talant Mamytov resigned, and Nurlanbek Shakiev was elected as the new speaker.

On 6 October 2022, the parliamentary group "Mekenchil" was created from single-mandate deputies who broke away from the group "Ata-Jurt Kyrgyzstan".

== Current composition ==
Constituency		Deputy	Party		Group	Birth year	Notes
Party list		Meikinbek Abdaliyev	Ata-Jurt Kyrgyzstan	33	Ata-Jurt Kyrgyzstan	1976	since 14 March 2022, replaced Ravshanbek Sabirov
Party list		Abdybahab Boronbayev	Ata-Jurt Kyrgyzstan	31	Ata-Jurt Kyrgyzstan	1968	since 2 April 2022, replaced Bakyt Torobayev
Party list		Jamilya Isayeva	Ata-Jurt Kyrgyzstan	4	Ata-Jurt Kyrgyzstan	1977	
Party list		Farhat Ismailov	Ata-Jurt Kyrgyzstan	21	Ata-Jurt Kyrgyzstan	1983	
Party list		Alisher Kozuyev	Ata-Jurt Kyrgyzstan	39	Ata-Jurt Kyrgyzstan	1984	
Party list		Gulsharkan Kultayeva	Ata-Jurt Kyrgyzstan	20	Ata-Jurt Kyrgyzstan	1972	
Party list		Zhanybek Kydykbayev	Ata-Jurt Kyrgyzstan	43	Ata-Jurt Kyrgyzstan	1985	
Party list		Talaybek Masabirov	Ata-Jurt Kyrgyzstan	11	Ata-Jurt Kyrgyzstan	1966	
Party list		Aybek Matkerimov	Ata-Jurt Kyrgyzstan	1	Ata-Jurt Kyrgyzstan	1980	
Party list		Nadira Narmatova	Ata-Jurt Kyrgyzstan	8	Ata-Jurt Kyrgyzstan	1958	
Osh Region	Alay	Ulan Primov	Single-mandate deputy		Ata-Jurt Kyrgyzstan	1978	
Party list		Zhyildyz Sadyrbayeva	Ata-Jurt Kyrgyzstan	36	Ata-Jurt Kyrgyzstan	1970	
Chüy Region	Chuy-Kemi	Mederbek Sakkarayev	Single-mandate deputy		Ata-Jurt Kyrgyzstan	1971	
Party list		Taalaybek Sarybashev	Ata-Jurt Kyrgyzstan	5	Ata-Jurt Kyrgyzstan	1971	
Jalal-Abad Region	Toktogul	Kunduzbek Sulaimanov	Single-mandate deputy		Ata-Jurt Kyrgyzstan	1967	
Party list		Eldar Sulaimanov	Ata-Jurt Kyrgyzstan	30	Ata-Jurt Kyrgyzstan	1985	
Jalal-Abad Region	Nooken	Baktybek Sydykov	Single-mandate deputy		Ata-Jurt Kyrgyzstan	1970	
Party list		Kamila Taliyeva	Ata-Jurt Kyrgyzstan		Ata-Jurt Kyrgyzstan	1967	
Party list		Jenishbek Toktorbayev	Ata-Jurt Kyrgyzstan	7	Ata-Jurt Kyrgyzstan	1968	
Bishkek	Lenin	Zhanybek Abirov	Single-mandate deputy		Mekenchil	1988	
Osh Region	Toloykon	Nurbek Alimbekov	Single-mandate deputy		Mekenchil	1975	
Jalal-Abad Region	Bazar-Korgon	Aibek Altynbekov	Single-mandate deputy		Mekenchil	1978	
Batken Region	Kadamjay	Yrysbek Atajanov	Single-mandate deputy		Mekenchil	1974	
Naryn Region	Naryn	Ulan Bakasov	Single-mandate deputy		Mekenchil	1984	
Osh Region	Nookat	Jusupbek Korgonbay uulu	Single-mandate deputy		Mekenchil	1977	
Osh Region	Kara-Suy	Iskender Matraimov	Single-mandate deputy		Mekenchil	1962	
Osh Region	Osh	Aybek Osmonov	Single-mandate deputy		Mekenchil	1984	
Osh Region	Uzgen	Elmurza Satybaldiyev	Single-mandate deputy		Mekenchil	1966	
Jalal-Abad Region	Jalal-Abad	Shayirbek Tashiev	Single-mandate deputy		Mekenchil	1976	
Osh Region	Kurshab	Daniyar Tolonov	Single-mandate deputy		Mekenchil	1972	
Jalal-Abad Region	Ala-Buka	Azizbek Tursunbaev	Single-mandate deputy		Mekenchil	1966	
Chüy Region	Moskva	Karim Khanjeza	Single-mandate deputy		Mekenchil	1982	
Jalal-Abad Region	Aksyi	Nurlanbek Shakiev	Single-mandate deputy		Mekenchil	1977	
Batken Region	Leylek	Chingiz Ajibayev	Single-mandate deputy		Eldik	1991	
Chüy Region	Zhayyl	Nurlanbek Azygaliyev	Single-mandate deputy		Eldik	1985	
Osh Region	Kok-Zhar	Omurbek Bakirov	Single-mandate deputy		Eldik	1978	
Jalal-Abad Region	Suzak	Tazabek Ikramov	Single-mandate deputy		Eldik	1974	
Chüy Region	Sokuluk	Amankan Kenjebaev	Single-mandate deputy		Eldik	1967	
Issyk-Kul Region	Djeti-Oguz	Arslanbek Maliyev	Single-mandate deputy		Eldik	1957	
Osh Region	Aravan	Jalolidin Nurbayev	Single-mandate deputy		Eldik	1971	
Batken Region	Batken	Nurlan Rajabaliyev	Single-mandate deputy		Eldik	1975	
Naryn Region	Kochkor	Mirlan Samyikojo	Single-mandate deputy		Eldik	1984	
Issyk-Kul Region	Issyk-Kul	Maksatbek Sarbagyshev	Single-mandate deputy		Eldik	1985	
Chüy Region	Issyk-Ata	Akbokon Tashtanbekov	Afghan Party (SMD)		Eldik	1963	
Issyk-Kul Region	Ak-Suy	Akylbek Tumonbayev	Single-mandate deputy		Eldik	1972	
Talas Region	Talas	Baktybek Choibekov	Single-mandate deputy		Eldik	1977	
Party list		Aysarakan Abdibayeva	Ishenim	44	Ishenim	1965	
Party list		Mederbek Aliyev	Ishenim	3	Ishenim	1986	
Party list		Emilbek Jusupov	Ishenim	9	Ishenim	1991	
Party list		Ruslanbek Jakyshov	Ishenim	54	Ishenim	1974	
Party list		Murat Murataliyev	Ishenim	35	Ishenim	1967	
Party list		Suyunbek Omurzakov	Ishenim	11	Ishenim	1968	
Party list		Ulugbek Ormonov	Ishenim	6	Ishenim	1963	
Party list		Cholpon Sultanbekova	Ishenim	24	Ishenim	1969	
Party list		Nurbek Sydygaliyev	Ishenim	5	Ishenim	1973	
Party list		Jyldyz Taalaybek kyzy	Ishenim	19	Ishenim	1985	
Party list		Mirgul Temirbayeva	Ishenim	15	Ishenim	1979	
Party list		Bahridin Shabazov	Ishenim	13	Ishenim	1984	
Party list		Aida Isatbek kyzy	Yntymak	4	Yntymak	1976	
Party list		Erlan Kokulov	Yntymak	15	Yntymak	1986	
Party list		Leyla Lurova	Yntymak	16	Yntymak	1968	
Party list		Sharapatkan Majitova	Yntymak	8	Yntymak	1955	
Party list		Marlen Mamataliyev	Yntymak	2	Yntymak	1981	
Party list		Talant Mamytov	Yntymak	7	Yntymak	1976	
Party list		Muradil Sydykov	Yntymak	29	Yntymak	1979	
Party list		Bakyt Tentishev	Yntymak	3	Yntymak	1986	
Party list		Balbak Tulobayev	Yntymak	13	Yntymak	1972	
Party list		Chingiz Aidarbekov	Alliance	3	Alliance	1977	
Party list		Janarbek Akayev	Alliance	2	Alliance	1986	
Party list		Nilufar Alimjanova	Alliance	32	Alliance	1991	
Party list		Farkhodbek Alimjanov	Alliance	6	Alliance	1988	
Party list		Emil Jamgyrchiev	Alliance	15	Alliance	1982	
Party list		Azamat Isirailov	Alliance	42	Alliance	1988	
Party list		Gulkan Moldobekova	Alliance	28	Alliance	1964	
Party list		Aygul Aydarova	United Kyrgyzstan	12	United Kyrgyzstan	1988	
Party list		Gulya Kojokulova	United Kyrgyzstan	8	United Kyrgyzstan	1965	
Party list		Adakhan Madumarov	United Kyrgyzstan	1	United Kyrgyzstan	1965	
Party list		Ishak Masaliyev	UK (PKK)	2	United Kyrgyzstan	1960	
Party list		Emil Toktoshev	United Kyrgyzstan	11	United Kyrgyzstan	1974	
Party list		Alisher Erbayev	United Kyrgyzstan	13	United Kyrgyzstan	1973	
Party list		Sultanbay Ayjigitov	Light of Faith	5	Light of Faith	1958	
Party list		Dinara Ashimova	Light of Faith	4	Light of Faith	1973	
Party list		Nurjigit Kadyrbekov	Light of Faith	1	Light of Faith	1977	
Party list		Zamirbek Mamasadykov	Light of Faith	13	Light of Faith	1981	
Party list		Vinera Raimbachayeva	Light of Faith	28	Light of Faith	1968	
Bishkek	Sverdlov	Shayloobek Atazov	Single-mandate deputy		Single-mandate	1979	
Chüy Region	Alamedin	Seidbek Atambayes	Social Democrats (SMD)		Single-mandate	1976	
Bishkek	Oktyabr	Dastan Bekeshev	Single-mandate deputy		Single-mandate	1983	
Talas Region	Manas	Dastanbek Jumabekov	Single-mandate deputy		Single-mandate	1976	
Bishkek	Pervomay	Elvira Surabaldiyeva	Single-mandate deputy		Single-mandate	1978	
