= List of political parties in Kyrgyzstan =

Political parties in Kyrgyzstan now have greater political power and freedom to campaign than at any previous time in the history of the nation. During the Akayev administration's rule, opposition parties were allowed, but were widely considered to have no real chance of gaining power. The Tulip Revolution brought an authentic multi-party system to Kyrgyzstan.

Political parties in Kyrgyzstan are mainly focused around the ideologies and personality of the party leaders rather than a static party-wide set of ideologies, so party programmes are subject to change if the party leadership changes.

== Parties represented in the Supreme Council ==
Party	Leader	Founded	Ideologies	Political position	MPs	Status
Mekenchil; Мекенчил	Sadyr Japarov	2010	Kyrgyz nationalism; National conservatism	Right-wing	19 / 90	Government
Fatherland Kyrgyzstan; Ата-Журт Кыргызстан; Ata-Jurt Kyrgyzstan	Aybek Matkerimov	1999	Kyrgyz nationalism; Economic liberalism	Right-wing	18 / 90	Government
Eldik; Элдик	Akylbek Tumonbayev	2021	Liberalism		18 / 90	Opposition
Ala-Too Party; Ала-Тоо					15 / 90	Opposition
Adilet Kyrgyzstan; Адилет Кыргызстан					14 / 90	Opposition
Cohesion; Ынтымак; Yntymak	Chingiz Makeshov	2012	Social conservatism	Right-wing	1 / 90	Support

== Other parties ==
- Afghans' Party
- Agrarian Labor Party of Kyrgyzstan
- Agrarian Party of Kyrgyzstan
- Alliance
- Ar-Namys (Dignity) Party
- Akshumkar
- Ata-Meken (Fatherland) Socialist Party
- Ata-Jurt Kyrgyzstan
- Ata-Zhurt
- Banner National Revival Party
- Beren
- Birimdik
- Communist Party of Kyrgyzstan
- Democratic Movement of Kyrgyzstan
- Democratic Women's Party of Kyrgyzstan
- Erkin Kyrgyzstan Progressive and Democratic Party
- Hizb ut-Tahrir
- Ishenim
- Justice Party
- Kyrgyzstan Party
- Kyrk Choro
- Light of Faith
- Mekenchil
- Movement for the People's Salvation
- Mutual Help Movement
- My Country Party of Action
- My Homeland Kyrgyzstan
- National Unity Democratic Movement
- Onuguu–Progress
- Party of Communists of Kyrgyzstan
- Peasant Party
- People's Party
- Republican Party of Kyrgyzstan
- Respublika Party of Kyrgyzstan
- Social Democrats
- Union of Democratic Forces
- United Kyrgyzstan

== Former parties ==
Party	Abbr.	Ideology	Political position	Leader	Years active
Ak Jol; Ак Жол элдик партиясы		Kyrgyz nationalism; National conservatism; Communitarianism; Pro-welfare state; Pro-free markets; Authoritarianism; Illiberalism; Crony capitalism (accused)	Centre-right	Igor Chudinov	2007–2010
Bir Bol; Мамлекеттик биримдик жана мекенчилдик саясий партиясы «Бир Бол»		Liberalism; Russophilia	Centre to centre-right	Altynbek Sulaymanov	2010–2021
Communist Party of Kirghizia; Кыргызстан Коммунисттик партиясы		Communism; Marxism–Leninism	Far-left	Nikolai Uzukov (1925–1927); Jumgalbek Amanbayev (1991)	1924–1991
Forward, Kyrgyzstan! Алга, Кыргызстан!				Bermet Akayeva	2003–2005
Respublika–Ata Zhurt; Республика–Ата Журт		Liberalism; Reformism	Centre to centre-right	Kamchybek Tashiev	2014–2017
Social Democratic Party of Kyrgyzstan; Кыргызстан социал-дeмoкратиялык партиясы	SDPK	Social democracy; Democratic socialism; Russophilia	Centre to centre-left	Disputed between Sagynbek Abdrahmanov and Anvar Artykov	1993–2020

== See also ==
- Politics of Kyrgyzstan
- List of political parties by country
