= Ata-Jurt Kyrgyzstan =

Ata-Jurt Kyrgyzstan Ата-Журт Кыргызстан
- Abbreviation: AJK
- Leader: Aibek Matkerimov
- Parliamentary leader: Baktybek Sydykov
- Founder: Zamirbek Esenamanov
- Founded: 22 September 1999 (El Birimdigi); 26 February 2021 (AJK)
- Ideology: Kyrgyz nationalism Economic liberalism
- Political position: Right-wing
- National affiliation: Mekenchil
- Colours: Blue
- Jogorku Kenesh: 20 / 90

Website
- atajurt.kg (archived)

Ata-Jurt Kyrgyzstan (Kyrgyz: Ата-Журт Кыргызстан; lit. 'Fatherland Kyrgyzstan') is a Kyrgyz political party, currently the largest in the country's Supreme Council. The party is described as one of the ruling parties of the Sadyr Japarov government.

Despite the similarity of its names to Ata-Jurt and Respublika–Ata Jurt, and its close ties to Kamchybek Tashiev, the founder of both of these parties, Ata-Jurt Kyrgyzstan is a separate entity, founded in 2021 on the legal basis of the inactive El Bigimdigi party.

== History ==
=== El Birimdigi ===
The El Birimdigi (Kyrgyz: Эл биримдиги, lit. 'Unity of the People') party was registered on 22 September 1999. The party's leader was Zamirbek Esenamanov, who later became a member of the Supreme Council for the Kyrgyzstan faction. Since its foundation, the party has not participated in any elections and has had no relation to the Ata-Jurt party.

=== Ata-Jurt Kyrgyzstan ===
On 26 February 2021, El Birimdigi re-registered under the name Ata-Jurt Kyrgyzstan, and Aibek Matkerimov became the new leader instead of Esenamanov. In order to quickly go through the re-registration procedure, El Birimdigi said that they allegedly lost their charter and registered a new one with a new party name. Two days before, on 24 February 2021, Kyrgyz President Sadyr Japarov announced that his Mekenchil party would not participate in the local elections and in the upcoming parliamentary election, citing concerns about potential accusations of using administrative resources.

Aibek Matkerimov was a candidate from the Mekenchil party in the annulled 2020 parliamentary election. In 2016–2021, Matkerimov was a local councillor from the Ata-Jurt party in the village of Barpy, where Kamchybek Tashiev was born.

==== 2021 local elections ====
In the local elections on 11 April 2021, Ata-Jurt Kyrgyzstan entered 17 city councils, including the Bishkek City Council, when they came fourth, and the Osh City Council, where they won. Kamchybek Tashiev's son, Taimuras Tashiev, became a member of the Jalal-Abad City Council from the Ata-Jurt Kyrgyzstan party. According to the Kyrgyz journalist organization Kloop, almost half of the party's candidates in the Osh local elections were acting civil servants, and that very third candidate of the party was previously associated with the Birimdik, Mekenim Kyrgyzstan and Kyrgyzstan parties. Journalists also found out that the Ata-Jurt Kyrgyzstan program was plagiarized from the Reforma party program for the 2020 Kyrgyz parliamentary election: in its program, Ata-Jurt Kyrgyzstan did not even remove the word-logo "#Reforma" from its program, despite the fact that the Reforma party was one of the opponents of Ata-Jurt Kyrgyzstan in these elections.

After the election day, nine parties demanded that Ata-Jurt Kyrgyzstan be removed from the local councils, because according to the law, the party must be registered 6 months before the elections. However, the head of the Bishkek Territorial Electoral Commission, Kairat Mamatov, said that re-registering the party before the elections is not a violation of the law. The parties also accused Ata-Jurt Kyrgyzstan of using administrative resources and buying votes to win the elections.

==== 2021 parliamentary election ====
According to an opinion poll conducted in September 2021, the Ata-Zhurt Kyrgyzstan party was second after Mekenchil, who ultimately did not take part in the parliamentary election. Mekenchil had 8% and Ata-Zhurt Kyrgyzstan 5% of the responses, respectively.

On 10 October 2021, Ata-Zhurt Kyrgyzstan held a pre-election congress and determined the pre-election list of its candidates. The first on the party's list were its leader Aibek Matkerimov, the leader of the Onuguu–Progress party Bakyt Torobayev, presidential adviser Ravshan Sabirov, former deputy director of the Center for Judicial Representation of the Government Jamilya Isayeva and former mayor of Osh Taalaibek Sarybashov. In addition to Matkerimov, the party's list also included five candidates who ran for Mekenchil in the 2020 parliamentary election, as well as three people from the Respublika–Ata Zhurt, another political party associated with Tashiev, which won the second place in the 2015 parliamentary election.

The Ata-Jurt Kyrgyzstan election fund received the largest amount of money during the election campaign: 33,642 million out of a total of 167,23 million soms. The party's agitators were accused of bribing voters: in the Osh Region, a car belonging to an agitator was found, containing a bag of money and diary with names and amounts of money that were possibly being distributed to voters.

In the 2021 parliamentary election, Ata-Jurt Kyrgyzstan won first place with 19.08% of the vote and 15 out of 54 deputies elected on the party list. Bakyt Torobayev received the largest number of votes among the candidates on the party list. The head of the Ata-Jurt Kyrgyzstan election headquarters, Kabyl Mambetaipov, stated that the elections were held "relatively honestly and fairly, without the use of administrative resources and bribery of voters."

In the newly elected Supreme Council, the Ata-Jurt Kyrgyzstan faction included 18 single-mandate-elected deputies, thereby making the party the largest in parliament with 33 seats in total. Bakyt Torobayev became the leader of the Ata-Jurt Kyrgyzstan parliamentary faction. On 29 March 2022, Torobyaev was appointed Deputy Chairman of the Cabinet of Ministers, and Nurlanbek Shakiev became the new parliamentary leader.

On 5 October 2022, Shakiev was elected Speaker of the Supreme Council of Kyrgyzstan after the resignation of Talant Mamytov. In addition to Ata-Jurt Kyrgyzstan, Shakiyev's candidacy was supported by Ishenim, Alliance and Eldik groups. The next day, 6 October 2022, 14 single-mandate-elected deputies, including Shakiev, left the Ata-Jurt Kyrgyzstan faction "in connection with a change in the internal structure", and created the Mekenchil parliamentary group. Baktybek Sydykov became the new parliamentary leader of Ata-Jurt Kyrgyzstan.

== Ideology ==
As described in a 2021 European Parliament report, Kyrgyz political parties lack distinct agendas but are divided into two main camps: of Japarov allies and opponents, with Ata-Jurt Kyrgyzstan belonging to the first camp.

During the 2021 parliamentary election campaign, the candidate from Ata-Jurt Kyrgyzstan stated that one of the country's strategic directions should be culture and national values, expressing regret that allegedly "over the past 30 years, culture has simply been forgotten" and that "among young people, foreign culture now dominates because they do not know or are not interested in their own, domestic one. This could be fraught with the loss of the national foundation and identity."

Ata-Jurt Kyrgyzstan, along with Yntymak and Ishenim, is described as the Japarov's party of power.

== Relation to Ata-Jurt party ==
Officially, Ata-Jurt Kyrgyzstan has no relation to Ata-Jurt party, created in 2006 by Kamchybek Tashiev and Sadyr Japarov. But despite this, the party is closely connected to Ata-Jurt and another project of Tashiev and Japarov, the Mekenchil party. Kamchybek Tashiev's son, Taimuras Tashiev, became a member of the Jalal-Abad City Council from the Ata-Jurt Kyrgyzstan party. However, he resigned his mandate that same year. During the parliamentary election campaign, party officials denied the party's ties with Tashiev, emphasizing that the party's leader is Matkerimov. For his part, Tashiev also denied involvement in the creation of the party. In addition to Tashiev, the Ata-Jurt Kyrgyzstan party was accused of having connections with the Raimbek Matraimov family, and their Mekenim Kyrgyzstan party.

== Election results ==
=== Parliamentary elections ===
Election	Leader	Votes	%	Seats	+/–	Rank	Government
2021	Aibek Matkerimov	223,705	19.07	15 / 90	–	1st	Support
