= 2000 Kyrgyz parliamentary election =

Parliamentary elections were held in Kyrgyzstan on 20 February 2000, with a second round on 12 March. The Union of Democratic Forces, an alliance of Asaba, the Party of Economic Revival, the Social Democratic Party and the Unity Party, emerged as the largest bloc in Parliament, with 12 of the 105 seats. Voter turnout was 64%.

== Results ==
Party	National			Constituency			Total seats
Party	Votes	%	Seats	Votes	%	Seats	Total seats
Party of Communists of Kyrgyzstan	454,589	29.33	5			1	6
Union of Democratic Forces	306,239	19.76	4			8	12
Democratic Women's Party of Kyrgyzstan	208,367	13.44	2			0	2
Party of Veterans of the Afghan War	131,933	8.51	2			0	2
Ata Meken Socialist Party	106,348	6.86	1			1	2
Moya Strana	82,352	5.31	1			3	4
Republican Democratic Party	68,405	4.41	0			0	0
Agrarian Labour Party of Kyrgyzstan	40,364	2.60	0			1	1
Agrarian Party of the Kyrgyz Republic	39,766	2.57	0			0	0
Manas	39,114	2.52	0			0	0
Asaba	24,663	1.59	0			0	0
People's Party						2	2
Erkin Kyrgyzstan						1	1
Independents						73	73
Against all	47,977	3.10	–				–
Total	1,550,117	100.00	15			90	105
Total votes	1,613,855	–					
Registered voters/turnout	2,505,763	64.41					
Source: OSCE, Nohlen et al.
