= Omurbek Tekebayev =

Kyrgyz politician (born 1958)

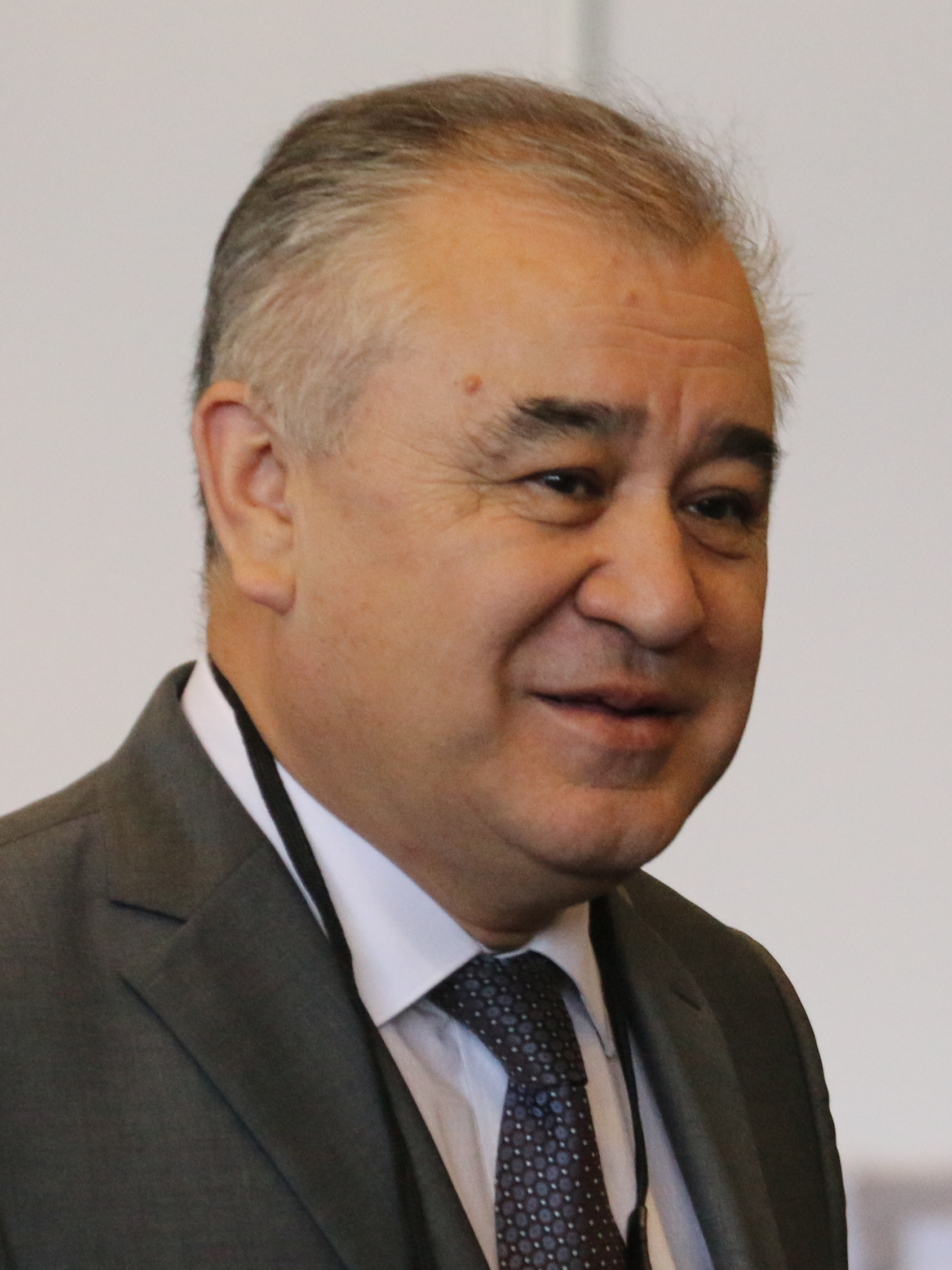
Tekebayev in 2016

Ömürbek Chirkesh uulu Tekebayev (Kyrgyz: Өмүрбек Чиркеш уулу Текебаев) is a Kyrgyz politician. He was Speaker of the Kyrgyz Parliament from March 2005 to March 2006. Tekebayev is the leader of the Ata-Meken socialist party. Currently, he serves as the ambassador of the Kyrgyz Republic to Germany.

== Early life ==
Tekebayev was born on 22 December 1958, in Jalal-Abad, Kyrgyz SSR. He graduated in physics from the Kyrgyz State University. He then worked as a teacher in Akman Bazar-Korgonskyj, a village in Jalal-Abad Province, and then graduated in law from the Kyrgyz State National University in 1994.

== Political career ==
Tekebayev was an opposition figure to the government of President Askar Akayev, which had ruled Kyrgyzstan since its independence in the early 1990s, following the collapse of the Soviet Union. Tekebayev ran twice for the presidency in the 1995 and 2000 elections. In 2000 he formed an election bloc with Felix Kulov and came in a distant second to Akayev with 14% of the vote; however, opposition leaders widely alleged electoral fraud.

On 27 March 2005, Tekebayev became Speaker of Parliament following the 2005 parliamentary elections. In the turmoil that followed, Akayev was forced to flee the country and an interim government headed by President Kurmanbek Bakiyev claimed power, due to the Tulip Revolution. Tekebayev emerged as one of the important figures in the transitional chaos, both due to his constitutional role as head of parliament and because while Akayev refused to recognize Bakiyev's authority as interim president, he did recognize Tekebayev's authority as Speaker of Parliament and indicated a willingness to negotiate with him. Ultimately these negotiations failed, however, and Bakiyev was elected as President in a landslide victory in July 2005.

Tekebayev announced his resignation as Speaker of Parliament after a political conflict with President Bakiyev on 27 February 2006.

On 6 September 2006, heroin was found in Tekebayev's luggage during a trip to Poland, in an incident generally regarded as an attempted frame.

Omurbek Tekebayev, in his capacity of co-chairman of the For Reforms political movement, played a key role in organizing very visible political protests against President Bakiyev in November 2006 and April 2007.

== 2010 South Kyrgyzstan ethnic clashes ==
Tekebayev was blamed for starting the June 2010 South Kyrgyzstan ethnic clashes by results of parliamentary commission of that year, which included 25 members of parliament. Many eyewitnesses pointed out that Ata Meken members of the Bazar-Korgon region and aggressive Uzbeks from the Rodina party burned down a house in the native village of Teyit of exiled President Kurmanbek Bakiyev. His brother Asylbek, according to numerous eyewitness accounts in the media, also participated in the pogrom.

Tekebaev's meetings with the Uzbek leader Kadyrzhan Batyrov were also reported by other Kyrgyz politicians, and accusations against him figured in the parliamentary investigations of the Ata-Zhurt party. The fact of meetings with his brother was confirmed also by Kadyrzhan Batyrov.

== Looting during the Kyrgyz Revolution of 2010 ==
The events of the April Revolution of 2010 were accompanied by mass riots and massive cases of looting. Members of the Ata Meken party were accused of having, on Tekebayev’s orders, made a number of organized attempts to loot the property of the former authorities. Arrested Bishkek jail inmates openly claimed that they were ordered to loot and burn the Bakiyevs' houses by Ata Meken party leaders.

The parliamentary commission, following the results of its audit in September 2012, also presented a conclusion, which reported that the leader of the parliamentary faction "Ata Meken" Omurbek Tekebayev and his deputy Bolot Sher were indirectly involved in the looting on April 7–8, 2010, and deputies Turatbek Madylbekov, Raykan Tologonov and their sons were directly involved in them. Tologonov denied even the very fact of a close acquaintance with Abdulla Yusupov. However, printouts of telephone conversations made it possible to prove that Tologonov contacted Abdulla Yusupov 7 times from 6 to 12 April 2010. Moreover, Raikan Tologonov himself called, and the calls were from those places where looting took place at that time. Those. Tologonov from Ata Meken were clearly present at the looting of the property of the Bakiyevs and persons close to them.

The parliamentary commission confirmed the conclusions, but the case did not go to the point of prosecution, due to opposition from the coalition of authorities in parliament and litigation by Tekebaev himself.

== Party Leader ==
As a party leader Tekebaev led Ata Meken party to elections in 2010, 2015, 2020 and 2021 elections. Party was able to pass in 2010 and in 2015 elections, but failed in 2020 and 2021 election. After this two consecutive losses Tekebaev accepted proposal of Kyrgyz authorities and became an ambassador of Kyrgyz Republic in Germany.

A number of deputies left the Ata Meken party and accused Tekebaev of building party cells with funding and contributions up to $300,000, along with selling seats in parliament in 2012. The Ata Meken faction, headed by Tekebaev, stated that the deputy of her own faction, Ravshan Jeenbekov, owed the party 50 thousand dollars, and if the debt was not paid, the faction would publish a list of his property. The deputies Zheenbekov and Abdrakhmanov themselves called it blackmail on the part of Tekebaev. Later, Jeenbekov and Abdrakhmanov were expelled from the party for failing to return their money and were forced to move to the far corners of the parliament building.

== Conflicts with the media ==
As the leader of the Ata Meken party in the ruling coalition, he simultaneously conducted 3 court cases against the media. The cases were covered by human rights activists and Radio Liberty. Some journalists were forced to flee abroad as political refugees and were able to return only after Tekebayev fell out of the majority coalition in parliament.

At that time, Omurbek Tekebayev headed the committee on judicial and legal reform, which was also criticized by the media and politicians.

== Corruption allegations ==
Tekebaev was accused by the infamous Russian oligarch Leonid Mayevsky of taking a bribe of 1 million US dollars for a positive solution to the issue of the Megacom mobile operator, but allegedly did not fulfill his obligations. A number of Ata Meken deputies and his longtime party members confirmed the statements of Leonid Mayevsky, and also confirmed the fact of meetings with Mayevsky, as well as the unknown origin of funds from Tekebaev for the party elections in 2010.

Members of his party who personally participated in the negotiations with Maevsky testified against Tekebaev. Tekebaev also refused to take a lie detector test with Leonid Mayevsky, when he proposed to do so.

The ex-representative of the Russian company Penwell Business Limited, stated that after the revolution on April 7, 2010, Omurbek Tekebayev, through his protege Azat Bazarkulov, actually managed the largest mobile operator in the country in the period from 2010 to 2015, and that it was he who paid for the election campaign of the Ata Meken party.

A number of human rights activists and oppositionists agreed with the plot of the accusation against Tekebaev. However, a number of supporters of Tekebaev and his fellow party members stated that Tekebaev had an alibi.

In April 2017, he was detained at Bishkek airport after flying from Vienna. The prosecutor general's office said in a statement that he took a $1m bribe from a Russian investor in 2010.

On 16 August 2017, Tekebayev was sentenced by a court to eight years imprisonment for corruption and fraud. He denied any wrongdoing and described his case as politically motivated. Tekebaev was released from prison amid a political conflict between Almazbek Atambayev and Sooronbai Jeenbekov, and later acquitted during presidency of Sadyr Japarov.

== Sex scandals ==
Omurbek Tekebaev has repeatedly found himself at the center of sex scandals, which significantly undermined his reputation and political rating. The first major scandal erupted in 2010 during the elections, when his behavior came under intense media and public scrutiny. Despite this, Tekebaev continued his political career and a few years later again found himself at the epicenter of a scandal. This time, journalists caught him in one of the nightclubs, which caused a new surge of discussions and criticism.

== Release from prison ==
After the failure of the party in the 2020 and 2021 parliamentary elections, he accepted the offer of the new authorities of Kyrgyzstan and became the Ambassador of Kyrgyzstan to Germany.

== International Relations ==
Currently he is serving as an ambassador of Kyrgyz Republic in Germany.

During the period of border conflicts between Tajikistan and Kyrgyzstan in April–May 2021 Tekebaev declared that “the Army of Kyrgyzstan is stronger than the army of Tajikistan”, which was ambiguously perceived by the Tajik and Kyrgyz public, who were moving away from the border conflict.
