= 2021 Kyrgyz parliamentary election =

- 28 November 2021
- All 90 seats in the Supreme Council; 46 seats needed for a majority
- Turnout: 34.61% (▼21.89pp)
Party	Leader	Vote %	Seats	+/–
Ata-Jurt	Aibek Matkerimov	19.07	15	New
Ishenim	Azamat Doroyev	15.03	12	New
Yntymak	Chingiz Makeshov	12.13	9	New
Alliance	Mirlan Jeenchoroyev	9.19	7	New
Butun Kyrgyzstan	Adakhan Madumarov	7.77	6	+6
Yiman Nuru	Nurzhigit Kadyrbekov	6.78	5	+5
Social Democrats	Kadyrbek Atambayev	3.51	1	+1
Independents	–	–	33	+33
This lists parties that won seats. See the complete results below.
Leading party by constituency
Speaker of the Supreme Council before	Speaker of the Supreme Council after
Talant Mamytov; Kyrgyzstan	Talant Mamytov; Yntymak

Snap parliamentary elections were held in Kyrgyzstan on 28 November 2021. They followed the annulment of the results of the October 2020 elections and the subsequent protests against the election's conduct. Six parties passed the 5% threshold needed to win seats in the parliament. Turnout hit a record low at less than 35%.

== Background ==
Following the large-scale 2020 Kyrgyz protests which resulted in the annulment of the October parliamentary election results, as well as the resignation of President Sooronbay Jeenbekov, Central Electoral Commission (CEC) head Nurjan Shyldabekova on 16 October 2020 announced that repeat elections could be held on 20 December. At a CEC meeting on 21 October, the elections were scheduled for the aforementioned date in December. However, just a day later on 22 October, the Supreme Council voted on a bill postponing the snap parliamentary elections and determining that they would be held no later than 1 June 2021, after new amendments to the Constitution would be adopted.

On 10 January 2021, the presidential elections and a government system referendum were held concurrently. As a result, Sadyr Japarov was elected as president with majority of voters approving his vision of a constitutional reform that called for a return of the country's presidential system. After Japarov assumed office, during an interview with Kazakh-based Kazinform news agency, he announced that the parliamentary elections would not be held in June, but in autumn instead.

During the course of political changes, Kyrgyzstan suffered a democratic backslide with a drop in its Freedom House world ranking to the "Not Free" category. In addition, several activists and academicians who criticised the authorities were charged with treason after being accused of calling for a violent seizure of power.

A new draft of the Constitution was unveiled in February 2021, which resulted in more calls for a referendum that was held in April 2021 and approved by a majority of voters. After coming to force on 5 May 2021, the seats in the Supreme Council were reduced from 120 to 90 along with MPs' powers, and a political advisory body People's Kurultai was formed. The head of state (President) was granted more executive authority, as well as the power to appoint almost all judges and heads of law enforcement agencies. New amendments to the Criminal Code, which were proposed by the Ministry of the Interior, were condemned by Human Rights Watch, warning that they would "endanger freedom of association and speech".

== Electoral system ==
Out of the 90 seats in the Supreme Council 54 will be elected by proportional representation in a single nationwide constituency, and 36 in single-seat districts. To win seats, parties must pass a national electoral threshold of 5% of the votes cast (down from 7% in the October 2020 elections), and receive at least 0.5% of the vote in each of the seven regions. The lists are open, with voters able to cast a single preferential vote. No one party is allowed to be given more than half of the proportional seats. Party lists are required to have at least 30% of the candidates from each gender, and every fourth candidate had to be of a different gender. Each list is also required to have at least 15% of the candidates being from ethnic minorities and 15% of under 35 years old, as well as at least two candidates with disabilities.

In addition, parliament abolished the use of Form No. 2, which allowed Kyrgyz voters to register to cast their ballots outside of their official home districts. The system was intended to allow migrant workers to vote where they worked, but after record numbers of this type of ballot were cast in the previous, annulled election, it was thought that the forms were abused to manipulate vote totals in the different regions.

== Parties admitted to the elections ==
A total of 21 parties were admitted to the elections. The Birimdik and Mekenim Kyrgyzstan parties did not participate, with former members joining other party lists.

Name				№	Ideology	Leader	2020 result	
Name				№	Ideology	Leader	Votes (%)	Seats
BK	United Kyrgyzstan; Бүтүн Кыргызстан			1	National conservatism Ethnic nationalism	Adakhan Madumarov	7.25%	13 / 120
AM	Ata Meken Socialist Party; Ата-Мекен Социалисттик Партиясы			2	Social democracy Democratic socialism	Omurbek Tekebayev	4.10%	0 / 120
Ishenim	Ishenim; Ишеним			3	Communitarianism	Azamat Doroyev	DNP	DNP
Yntymak	Yntymak; Ынтымак			4	Direct democracy	Chingiz Makeshov	DNP	DNP
UB	Uluttar Birimdigi; Улуттар Биримдиги			5	Cultural nationalism	Melisbek Myrzakmatov	DNP	DNP
AJK	Ata-Jurt Kyrgyzstan; Ата-Журт Кыргызстан			6	Kyrgyz nationalism	Aibek Matkerimov	6.96% (Note: Mekenchil)	0 / 120
YN	Light of Faith; Ыйман Нуру			7	Liberalism; Anti-corruption	Nurzhigit Kadyrbekov	3.41%	0 / 120
Alliance	Alliance; Альянс							
Alliance	Alliance; Альянс	AK	A Just Kyrgyzstan; Адилеттүү Кыргызстан	8		Mirlan Jeenchoroyev	DNP	DNP
Alliance	Alliance; Альянс	KLDP	Kyrgyz Liberal Democratic Party; Кыргыз либерал демократиялык партиясы	8	Liberalism	Janar Akaev	DNP	DNP
Alliance	Alliance; Альянс	BB	Bir Bol; Бир Бол	8	Liberalism; Russophilia	Altynbek Sulaymanov	3.08%	0 / 120
EÜ	El Ümütü; Эл Үмүтү			9		Bolot Ibragimov	DNP	DNP
Azattyk	Azattyk Democratic Party "Азаттык" демократиялык партиясы			10		Ismail Isakov	DNP	DNP
UJ	Uluu-Jurt; Улуу-Журт			11		Mirlan Orozbaev	DNP	DNP
ME	Mekenchil El Democratic Party "Мекенчил Эл" демократиялык партиясы			12	Social conservatism	Bakyt Ibraev	DNP	DNP
PPEK	Kyrgyzstan Patriotic Party of the Unity; Кыргызстандын Бириктирүүчү патриоттук партиясы			13		Bakyt Osmankulov	DNP	DNP
SDK	Social Democrats; Социал-демократтар			14	Social democracy Pro-Atambayev	Kadyrbek Atambayev	2.17%	0 / 120
Aruuzat	Party of People's Dignity - Aruuzat; Аруузат – Эл куту			15		Almakan Bekova	DNP	DNP
Ordo	The Centre; Ордо			16	Populism	Mirbek Miyarov	0.22%	0 / 120
Bagyt	Liberal Democratic Party of Kyrgyzstan "Bagyt" "Багыт" либералдык-демократиялык партиясы			17	Liberalism Liberal democracy	Belek Esenaliev	DNP	DNP
KJP	Party of Greens; Кыргызстан Жашылдар Партиясы			18	Green politics	Emil Yusuvaliev	DNP	DNP
Legalise	Political Party "Legalise"; Саясий партиясы Легалайз			19	Cannabis decriminalization	Eldar Madylbekov	DNP	DNP
KR	Strong Region; Күчтүү регион			20	Regionalism	Alexander Savitsky	DNP	DNP
JK	Long live Kyrgyzstan; Жашасын Кыргызстан			21		Toktayim Umetalieva	DNP	DNP

== Opinion polls ==
Polling firm	Fieldwork date	Sample	AJK	Yntymak	Ishenim	Ata Meken	Light of Faith	Bütün	El Ümütü	SDK	Others	Against all	Undecided	Boycott	Lead
IRI	18 November 2021	11,000	5%	1%		3%	3%	3%		4%	2%	10%	36%	14%	1%
Eurasians	16 November 2021	11,000	14.0%	11.0%	9.8%	8.2%	7.0%	6.6%	5.2%	2.7%	9.9%	6.3%	16.0%	3.30%	3%
2020 election	4 October 2020	1,990,753	7.0%	—	—	4.1%	3.4%	7.3%	—	2.2%	74.3%	1.8%	—	—	0.6%

== Results ==
Two single-member constituency seats, №27 Pervomayskiy and №29 Sverdlov, were left vacant as the against all option received the most votes.

Party	Proportional			Constituency			Total seats
Party	Votes	%	Seats	Votes	%	Seats	Total seats
Ata-Jurt Kyrgyzstan	223,705	19.07	15				15
Ishenim	176,287	15.03	12				12
Yntymak	142,262	12.13	9	6,313	0.53	0	9
Alliance	107,776	9.19	7				7
United Kyrgyzstan	91,115	7.77	6	5,099	0.43	0	6
Light of Faith	79,507	6.78	5	1,454	0.12	0	5
El Ümütü	58,197	4.96	0				0
Azattyk Democratic Party	52,655	4.49	0				0
Ata Meken Socialist Party	46,200	3.94	0				0
Social Democrats	41,200	3.51	0	7,976	0.67	1	1
Uluttar Birimdigi	31,663	2.70	0				0
Mekenchil El Democratic Party	20,626	1.76	0				0
Liberal Democratic Party of Kyrgyzstan "Bagyt"	12,704	1.08	0				0
Patriotic Party of the Unity of Kyrgyzstan	12,474	1.06	0				0
Uluu-Zhurt	9,445	0.81	0				0
Strong Region	8,237	0.70	0				0
Political Party "Legalise"	8,070	0.69	0				0
The Centre	5,980	0.51	0				0
Party of People's Dignity — Aruuzat	5,931	0.51	0				0
Long Live Kyrgyzstan	5,659	0.48	0				0
Green Party of Kyrgyzstan	5,301	0.45	0				0
Independents				1,051,703	88.68	33	33
Against all	28,202	2.40	–	113,371	9.56	2	2
Total	1,173,196	100.00	54	1,185,916	100.00	36	90
Valid votes	1,173,196	91.54		1,185,916	96.19		
Invalid/blank votes	108,426	8.46		47,008	3.81		
Total votes	1,281,622	100.00		1,232,924	100.00		
Registered voters/turnout	3,703,420	34.61		3,619,272	34.07		
Source: CEC, CEC

=== By constituency ===
№1 Leylek
Candidate	Party	Votes	%
Chingyz Ilyaskojoevich Ajibaev	Independent	10,847	34.50
Ismanali Egemberdievich Joroev	Independent	7,298	23.21
Baymurat Asanovich Bekmuratov	Independent	2,659	8.46
Ashirbay Bapovich Jusupov	Independent	2,553	8.12
Asylbek Turabaevich Mukaramov	Independent	2,358	7.50
Nazgul Nazirovna Abdiraimova	Independent	2,085	6.63
Ina Immatovich Immatov	Independent	1,908	6.07
Kasym Abdusamatovich Tashtankulov	Independent	561	1.78
Mirbek Abdrakhimovich Segizbaev	Independent	386	1.23
Against all		784	2.49
Total		31,439	100.00
Valid votes		31,439	97.27
Invalid/blank votes		884	2.73
Total votes		32,323	100.00
Registered voters/turnout		90,056	35.89

№2 Batken
Candidate	Party	Votes	%
Nurlan Askaralievich Rajabaliev	Independent	6,556	19.02
Chyntemir Kamchybekovich Ashiraliev	Independent	6,310	18.30
Begali Pirmamatovich Tölömüshov	United Kyrgyzstan	5,099	14.79
Kengesh Karimovich Salikhov	Independent	3,188	9.25
Maksatbek Dykanovich Dykanov	Independent	2,574	7.47
Gylamidin Ürüstömovich Artykbaev	Independent	1,605	4.66
Asylbek Altymyshovich Madaliev	Independent	2,251	6.53
Kanatbek Abylkasym uulu	Independent	1,815	5.27
Nomanjan Akmatovich Arkabaev	Independent	2,472	7.17
Munarbek Hudaiberdievich Yusupaliev	Independent	1,224	3.55
Against all		1,378	4.00
Total		34,472	100.00
Valid votes		34,472	97.21
Invalid/blank votes		990	2.79
Total votes		35,462	100.00
Registered voters/turnout		101,836	34.82

№3 Kadamjay
Candidate	Party	Votes	%
Yrysbek Islamovich Atajanov	Independent	6,047	16.84
Zamirbek Samamatovich Sygrabaev	Independent	4,621	12.87
Suyunbek Burkanidinovich Kurvanbaev	Independent	3,334	9.28
Nurali Orozalievich Talipov	Independent	3,021	8.41
Mukhtar Mirsalievich Mirkadyrov	Independent	2,054	5.72
Kanybek Toktomatovich Ganiev	Independent	2,043	5.69
Abdijamil Jusupovich Nasirov	Independent	1,880	5.23
Aidanbek Akmatovich Akmatov	Independent	1,824	5.08
Sherahmad Halilovich Alibekov	Independent	1,801	5.01
Nurbek Malikovich Dosanov	Independent	1,777	4.95
Bekbolot Muradilovich Muradilov	Independent	1,532	4.27
Abdunabi Salievich Nazarbaev	Independent	1,206	3.36
Mursalim Sultanalievich Maksutov	Independent	1,191	3.32
Abdulhamid Shamshidin uulu	Independent	891	2.48
Ömürkan Tursunaliyevna Mamatalieva	Independent	777	2.16
Erkeayim Gulbaevna Sadykova	Independent	603	1.68
Rozakan Sultanovna Mamanova	Independent	244	0.68
Against all		1,072	2.98
Total		35,918	100.00
Valid votes		35,918	97.00
Invalid/blank votes		1,110	3.00
Total votes		37,028	100.00
Registered voters/turnout		113,224	32.70

№4 Kok-Jar
Candidate	Party	Votes	%
Ömürbek Mirzaimovich Bakirov	Independent	10,788	33.11
Ravshanbek Rysbaevich Rysbaev	Independent	10,070	30.91
Ulanbek Adanbekovich Madmarov	Independent	5,367	16.47
Abdivap Momunovich Zulpuev	Independent	2,549	7.82
Azamat Abdilazizovich Abdrakhmanov	Independent	1,589	4.88
Chyngyz Süyünbayevich Tümönov	Independent	943	2.89
Mirlanbek Eshmamatovich Tursunkulov	Independent	476	1.46
Against all		799	2.45
Total		32,581	100.00
Valid votes		32,581	96.88
Invalid/blank votes		1,050	3.12
Total votes		33,631	100.00
Registered voters/turnout		80,070	42.00

№5 Nookat
Candidate	Party	Votes	%
Jusupbek Korgonbai uulu	Independent	13,323	44.34
Bakytbek Asamidinovich Maripov	Independent	13,274	44.17
Artykbay Turabidinovich Abdivaliev	Independent	2,588	8.61
Against all		865	2.88
Total		30,050	100.00
Valid votes		30,050	97.16
Invalid/blank votes		878	2.84
Total votes		30,928	100.00
Registered voters/turnout		81,902	37.76

№6 Araban
Candidate	Party	Votes	%
Jalolidin Payazidinovich Nurbaev	Independent	14,913	46.65
Ilkhom Abdukaharovich Mannanov	Independent	6,446	20.16
Bakytbek Toktosunovich Nurbaev	Independent	3,344	10.46
Davlatbek Mamaturdalievich Abduvaliev	Independent	2,531	7.92
Elmurat Adbuvapovich Obdunov	Independent	2,403	7.52
Adakhamjon Alimjonovich Gaipov	Independent	1,321	4.13
Against all		1,013	3.17
Total		31,971	100.00
Valid votes		31,971	96.36
Invalid/blank votes		1,206	3.64
Total votes		33,177	100.00
Registered voters/turnout		91,012	36.45

№7 Osh
Candidate	Party	Votes	%
Aybek Japarovich Osmonov	Independent	20,674	53.45
Bekbolot Oskonbaevich Arzibaev	Independent	7,160	18.51
Emil Jumabaevich Saypidinov	Independent	1,903	4.92
Jambylbek Kamchiev	Independent	1,271	3.29
Dayyr Bayamanovich Sagynbaev	Independent	1,074	2.78
Against all		6,595	17.05
Total		38,677	100.00
Valid votes		38,677	93.68
Invalid/blank votes		2,610	6.32
Total votes		41,287	100.00
Registered voters/turnout		111,058	37.18

№8 Tölöykön
Candidate	Party	Votes	%
Nurbek Kaaryevich Alimbekov	Independent	17,382	42.02
Shailoobek Karybekovich Atazov	Independent	16,258	39.30
Aybek Mamatovich Orozbaev	Independent	2,524	6.10
Vitaliy Yuryevich Jukov	Independent	1,627	3.93
Against all		3,576	8.64
Total		41,367	100.00
Valid votes		41,367	95.66
Invalid/blank votes		1,877	4.34
Total votes		43,244	100.00
Registered voters/turnout		118,699	36.43

№9 Kara-Suu
Candidate	Party	Votes	%
Iskender Ismailovich Matraimov	Independent	21,507	68.37
Tolkun Turdukulovich Ergeshov	Independent	2,434	7.74
Gavkharbek Asylbekovich Primkulov	Independent	1,533	4.87
Bakytbek Bakir	Independent	1,522	4.84
Nursultan Erkinbekovich Abdyrazakov	Independent	959	3.05
Against all		3,500	11.13
Total		31,455	100.00
Valid votes		31,455	92.09
Invalid/blank votes		2,702	7.91
Total votes		34,157	100.00
Registered voters/turnout		100,484	33.99

№10 Kurshab
Candidate	Party	Votes	%
Daniyar Ermekovich Tolonov	Independent	9,255	26.11
Erjigit Jetimishovich Pasangov	Independent	7,209	20.34
Aytmamat Tentibaevich Kadyrbaev	Independent	6,047	17.06
Ulukbek Khadjimukanovich Bakyev	Independent	3,263	9.20
Altynbek Egemberdievich Toktorov	Independent	2,701	7.62
Nurbek Adanbekovich Sadykov	Independent	2,203	6.21
Nurlan Isamidinovich Tanabaev	Independent	1,861	5.25
Tölögön Kyazovich Keldibaev	Independent	977	2.76
Against all		1,934	5.46
Total		35,450	100.00
Valid votes		35,450	95.48
Invalid/blank votes		1,679	4.52
Total votes		37,129	100.00
Registered voters/turnout		112,053	33.14

№11 Alay
Candidate	Party	Votes	%
Ulan Berdybaevich Primov	Independent	21,596	51.69
Dayirbek Teyishovich Orunbekov	Independent	6,436	15.41
Bakytbek Saipovich Saipov	Independent	6,106	14.62
Zamirbek Sabirjanovich Bojonov	Independent	4,525	10.83
Ulukmyrza Abdilashimovich Tootaev	Independent	1,223	2.93
Against all		1,891	4.53
Total		41,777	100.00
Valid votes		41,777	97.39
Invalid/blank votes		1,118	2.61
Total votes		42,895	100.00
Registered voters/turnout		114,629	37.42

№12 Uzgen
Candidate	Party	Votes	%
Elmurza Rakievich Satybaldiev	Independent	21,108	83.89
Against all		4,055	16.11
Total		25,163	100.00
Valid votes		25,163	87.54
Invalid/blank votes		3,581	12.46
Total votes		28,744	100.00
Registered voters/turnout		89,257	32.20

№13 Suzak
Candidate	Party	Votes	%
Tazabek Ikramovich Ikramov	Independent	11,912	33.14
Edelbek Mamatkulovich Kulmatov	Independent	10,134	28.19
Omurbek Kalybekovich Egemberdiev	Independent	3,054	8.50
Abdymanap Abdybakhapovich Abdybakhapov	Independent	2,275	6.33
Sabyraly Toychuevich Kebekbaev	Independent	2,146	5.97
Abdillabek Rakmanovich Kambarov	Independent	2,044	5.69
Jusupjan Amrajanovich Djeenbekov	Independent	1,265	3.52
Yulia Viktorovna Liliental	Independent	867	2.41
Manas Kutchubekovich Maksutov	Independent	526	1.46
Against all		1,724	4.80
Total		35,947	100.00
Valid votes		35,947	95.19
Invalid/blank votes		1,818	4.81
Total votes		37,765	100.00
Registered voters/turnout		111,510	33.87

№14 Jalal-Abad
Candidate	Party	Votes	%
Shairbek Kydyrshaevich Tashiev	Independent	21,287	65.04
Keldibek Erkinbekovich Jeenbekov	Independent	1,978	6.04
Manas Kanybekovich Shaimkulov	Independent	1,842	5.63
Kumarbek Kanbolotovich Mamasydykov	Independent	1,365	4.17
Taalaybek Aytyshovich Atabekov	Independent	1,173	3.58
Chyngyz Jusupovich Salymbaev	Independent	585	1.79
Against all		4,500	13.75
Total		32,730	100.00
Valid votes		32,730	95.54
Invalid/blank votes		1,527	4.46
Total votes		34,257	100.00
Registered voters/turnout		106,565	32.15

№15 Bazar-Korgon
Candidate	Party	Votes	%
Aybek Altynbekov	Independent	22,145	62.82
Kubanychbek Bakiev	Independent	7,570	21.48
Süyünbek Abitovich Arzykulov	Independent	1,351	3.83
Aygül Kazybekovna Kongurbayeva	Independent	1,086	3.08
Artur Alimjanovich Umetaliev	Independent	963	2.73
Against all		2,135	6.06
Total		35,250	100.00
Valid votes		35,250	95.98
Invalid/blank votes		1,478	4.02
Total votes		36,728	100.00
Registered voters/turnout		112,952	32.52

№16 Nooken
Candidate	Party	Votes	%
Baktybek Usenovich Sydykov	Independent	19,688	56.78
Akylbek Sovetbekovich Arstanbekov	Independent	10,038	28.95
Kadyrbek Musaevich Matsakov	Independent	1,769	5.10
Murat Kalmamatovich Kadyrkulov	Independent	1,047	3.02
Against all		2,132	6.15
Total		34,674	100.00
Valid votes		34,674	95.65
Invalid/blank votes		1,577	4.35
Total votes		36,251	100.00
Registered voters/turnout		95,142	38.10

№17 Aksy
Candidate	Party	Votes	%
Nurlanbek Turgunbekovich Shakiev	Independent	12,082	38.71
Manas Alisherovich Chomonov	Independent	6,864	21.99
Almazbek Manasbekovich Ergeshov	Independent	5,923	18.98
Akat Akynovich Momunov	Independent	2,697	8.64
Süyünbay Jumakanovich Toktobaev	Independent	1,837	5.89
Almazbek Usupbaevich Shaydiev	Independent	1,009	3.23
Against all		799	2.56
Total		31,211	100.00
Valid votes		31,211	98.27
Invalid/blank votes		549	1.73
Total votes		31,760	100.00
Registered voters/turnout		79,495	39.95

№18 Ala-Buka
Candidate	Party	Votes	%
Azizbek Atakozuevich Tursunbaev	Independent	11,279	38.57
Mederkul Ormonovich Sulaymankulov	Independent	6,779	23.18
Adylbek Sharipovich Alymov	Independent	6,519	22.29
Chyngyz Ashyrbekovich Omorov	Independent	2,176	7.44
Iskender Erikovich Turanov	Independent	1,447	4.95
Against all		1,045	3.57
Total		29,245	100.00
Valid votes		29,245	97.35
Invalid/blank votes		797	2.65
Total votes		30,042	100.00
Registered voters/turnout		80,107	37.50

№19 Toktogul
Candidate	Party	Votes	%
Kunduzbek Koshalievich Sulaimanov	Independent	7,957	22.43
Osmon Joldoshbekovich Turdumambetov	Independent	6,924	19.52
Nurbek Temirbekovich Totonov	Yntymak	6,313	17.80
Bolotbek Sogushbekovich Düyshenaliev	Independent	3,694	10.41
Timurlan Apizkanovich Karmyshov	Independent	2,607	7.35
Abdybek Düyshebekovich Bekishov	Independent	1,684	4.75
Akylbek Kalyshevich Rakaev	Independent	1,547	4.36
Bekanas Zamirbekovich Baygaziev	Independent	1,269	3.58
Janyshbek Myrzabekovich Matmusaev	Independent	832	2.35
Against all		2,646	7.46
Total		35,473	100.00
Valid votes		35,473	97.04
Invalid/blank votes		1,081	2.96
Total votes		36,554	100.00
Registered voters/turnout		99,849	36.61

№20 Manas
Candidate	Party	Votes	%
Dastanbek Artisbekovich Djumabekov	Independent	13,252	40.32
Mirlan Rysbekovich Nazarbekov	Independent	13,193	40.14
Almazbek Almanbetovich Djakeev	Independent	3,080	9.37
Zamirbek Toktogulovich Mambetkulov	Independent	1,207	3.67
Sardar Sharshenbek	Independent	859	2.61
Shadykan Myrzakanovich Jakypbekov	Independent	345	1.05
Against all		934	2.84
Total		32,870	100.00
Valid votes		32,870	97.80
Invalid/blank votes		740	2.20
Total votes		33,610	100.00
Registered voters/turnout		82,635	40.67

№21 Talas
Candidate	Party	Votes	%
Baktybek Kanybekovich Choybekov	Independent	9,773	35.06
Emilbek Myrzakulovich Abdykadyrov	Independent	7,204	25.84
Aybek Myrzakerimovich Buzurmankulov	Independent	3,589	12.88
Esen Tynybekovich Sariev	Independent	2,938	10.54
Muktarbek Mukulovich Aytkulov	Independent	1,885	6.76
Törökan Beyshenbekovich Junusbekov	Independent	821	2.95
Against all		1,665	5.97
Total		27,875	100.00
Valid votes		27,875	97.11
Invalid/blank votes		830	2.89
Total votes		28,705	100.00
Registered voters/turnout		80,183	35.80

№22 Jayyl
Candidate	Party	Votes	%
Nurlanbek Asanbekovich Azygaliev	Independent	8,689	29.11
Nurmat Ryskulbek uulu	Independent	5,261	17.62
Baktybek Kemelbekovich Rayymkulov	Independent	4,802	16.09
Emir Erkinbekovich Amankulov	Independent	3,519	11.79
Manasbek Toktogulovich Karabaev	Independent	2,608	8.74
Zamirbek Dakimovich Mamaev	Independent	1,560	5.23
Askarbek Kolkhozbekovich Bakeev	Independent	613	2.05
Against all		2,801	9.38
Total		29,853	100.00
Valid votes		29,853	95.73
Invalid/blank votes		1,332	4.27
Total votes		31,185	100.00
Registered voters/turnout		99,752	31.26

№23 Moskva
Candidate	Party	Votes	%
Karim Lamzarovich Khandjeza	Independent	5,436	20.78
Jusupbek Kamchybekovich Zikirov	Independent	4,279	16.36
Mirlan Ratynbekovich Djakshenov	Independent	3,480	13.31
Talay Madanbekovich Imankulov	Independent	2,386	9.12
Raad Bakashevich Myrzakanov	Independent	2,158	8.25
Turatbek Madylbekov	Independent	2,104	8.04
Rinat Sharshenbekovich Djabaev	Independent	1,548	5.92
Erkin Kasymovich Bulekbaev	Independent	925	3.54
Mirbek Duyshenbekovich Najiev	Independent	765	2.92
Evgeniy Ravilyevich Engalychev	Independent	581	2.22
Against all		2,493	9.53
Total		26,155	100.00
Valid votes		26,155	95.25
Invalid/blank votes		1,303	4.75
Total votes		27,458	100.00
Registered voters/turnout		87,993	31.20

№24 Sokuluk
Candidate	Party	Votes	%
Amankan Batyrbekovich Kenjebaev	Independent	5,005	20.17
Ramis Mayrambekovich Djunusaliev	Independent	4,108	16.56
Elkinbek Toktogonovich Ashirbaev	Independent	3,776	15.22
Ulan Sheyshenbekovich Sadaliev	Independent	3,285	13.24
Sooronbai Ergeshovich Abdyldaev	Independent	1,456	5.87
Gülüypa Ömürzakovna Karymshakova	Independent	1,398	5.63
Kanybek Kubanychbekovich Sarymsakov	Independent	1,117	4.50
Against all		4,665	18.80
Total		24,810	100.00
Valid votes		24,810	95.67
Invalid/blank votes		1,122	4.33
Total votes		25,932	100.00
Registered voters/turnout		100,105	25.90

№25 Alamüdün
Candidate	Party	Votes	%
Seydbek Almazbekovich Atambaev	Social Democrats	7,976	27.43
Bolotbek Kasymbekovich Begaliev	Independent	4,169	14.34
Berdibek Aybekovich Chyntemirov	Independent	3,458	11.89
Kanybek Kapashovich Imanaliev	Independent	2,978	10.24
Emil Bazarkulovich Momunkulov	Independent	2,068	7.11
Zarylbek Rubenovich Abduvaliev	Independent	1,050	3.61
Azamat Aspek uulu	Independent	967	3.33
Aybek Medetbekovich Dunkanaev	Independent	537	1.85
Talgat Melisovich Momonkulov	Independent	526	1.81
Against all		5,353	18.41
Total		29,082	100.00
Valid votes		29,082	94.92
Invalid/blank votes		1,556	5.08
Total votes		30,638	100.00
Registered voters/turnout		111,353	27.51

№26 Lenin
Candidate	Party	Votes	%
Janybek Bolotbekovich Abirov	Independent	10,914	32.60
Ravshan Batyrbekovich Djeenbekov	Independent	3,672	10.97
Maksat Kasymjanovich Kunakunov	Independent	3,508	10.48
Anarbek Ryskulovich Tashiev	Independent	1,284	3.84
Anarkul Myrzabekovna Usupbekova	Independent	1,160	3.47
Murat Kubanovich Esenamanov	Independent	1,000	2.99
Aktilek Nurlanbekovich Nurlanbekov	Independent	770	2.30
Aybek Jusupovich Alseitov	Independent	658	1.97
Kubanychbek Bektemirovich Makeshov	Independent	481	1.44
Ulugbek Abdisatarovich Kalykov	Independent	374	1.12
Against all		9,656	28.84
Total		33,477	100.00
Valid votes		33,477	96.60
Invalid/blank votes		1,178	3.40
Total votes		34,655	100.00
Registered voters/turnout		111,465	31.09

№27 Pervomayskiy
Candidate	Party	Votes	%
Ruslanbek Akylbekovich Akylbekov	Independent	4,890	15.41
Meerimbek Nurbekovich Koychumanov	Independent	3,911	12.32
Nurbek Akbarovich Toktakunov	Independent	3,840	12.10
Mavlyan Amangeldievich Askarbekov	Independent	3,272	10.31
Erkingul Abylovna Abdramanova	Independent	1,773	5.59
Edil Marlis uulu	Independent	1,716	5.41
Beyshenbek Toktobaevich Abdrazakov	Independent	1,325	4.18
Against all		11,009	34.69
Total		31,736	100.00
Valid votes		31,736	96.44
Invalid/blank votes		1,171	3.56
Total votes		32,907	100.00
Registered voters/turnout		109,558	30.04

№28 Oktyabr
Candidate	Party	Votes	%
Dastan Dalabayevich Bekeshev	Independent	15,617	49.39
Melis Toktomambetovich Turganbaev	Independent	6,322	19.99
Ruslan Jamanakovich Kydyrmyshev	Independent	3,515	11.12
Bakyt Makenovich Kerimbekov	Independent	596	1.88
Tilek Sabyrovich Usupov	Independent	587	1.86
Against all		4,983	15.76
Total		31,620	100.00
Valid votes		31,620	97.33
Invalid/blank votes		868	2.67
Total votes		32,488	100.00
Registered voters/turnout		105,800	30.71

№29 Sverdlov
Candidate	Party	Votes	%
Yrysbek Sharshenbaevich Maatkabylov	Independent	8,041	28.27
Taalaybek Esenbekovich Dayirbekov	Independent	5,208	18.31
Nurdin Talantbekovich Samonov	Independent	2,274	7.99
Aknazar Askarbekovich Kenjebaev	Independent	1,625	5.71
Against all		11,295	39.71
Total		28,443	100.00
Valid votes		28,443	95.36
Invalid/blank votes		1,383	4.64
Total votes		29,826	100.00
Registered voters/turnout		103,520	28.81

№30 Ysyk-Ata
Candidate	Party	Votes	%
Akbokon Dukenovich Tashtanbekov	Independent	4,806	16.74
Djanat Asylbekovich Edigeev	Independent	4,507	15.70
Atamsha Latifovich Dursunov	Independent	3,371	11.74
Nurbek Usenkulovich Djyrgalbaev	Independent	2,992	10.42
Maksat Borisovich Ryskulov	Independent	2,798	9.74
Bayish Jantaevich Kurmanov	Independent	2,797	9.74
Vadim Aleksandrovich Sadovnikov	Independent	1,204	4.19
Mirlan Abdybekovich Bekitaev	Light of Faith	1,110	3.87
Askar Tumurchinovich Kasymov	Independent	1,019	3.55
Akylbek Almarbekovich Kojokeev	Independent	499	1.74
Duyshombek Kadyrkulovich Budaychiev	Independent	288	1.00
Against all		3,325	11.58
Total		28,716	100.00
Valid votes		28,716	95.94
Invalid/blank votes		1,216	4.06
Total votes		29,932	100.00
Registered voters/turnout		96,866	30.90

№31 Chuy-Kemin
Candidate	Party	Votes	%
Mederbek Djamankulovich Sakkaraev	Independent	9,834	25.78
Tynaibek Kanybekovich Janseitov	Independent	8,528	22.36
Nurlan Altymyshovich Sharshenaliev	Independent	3,050	8.00
Rustam Rakhimovich Tashiev	Independent	3,036	7.96
Emilbek Askeevich Isenaliev	Independent	2,399	6.29
Kanybek Osmonaliev	Independent	2,048	5.37
Akylbek Ryskeldievich Mursaliev	Independent	1,960	5.14
Aybek Kurmanovich Botobaev	Independent	1,443	3.78
Nurlan Kadyrbekovich Duyshenaliev	Independent	743	1.95
Kubatbek Shamyrbekovich Mamyrov	Independent	676	1.77
Askar Djumabekovich Abakirov	Independent	556	1.46
Anash Toktosunovich Seytkaziev	Independent	513	1.34
Abaskan Kazakbaevich Sariev	Independent	297	0.78
Against all		3,059	8.02
Total		38,142	100.00
Valid votes		38,142	96.70
Invalid/blank votes		1,301	3.30
Total votes		39,443	100.00
Registered voters/turnout		114,731	34.38

№32 Kochkor
Candidate	Party	Votes	%
Mirlan Samyikojo	Independent	9,419	23.05
Ormon Nurbek uulu	Independent	7,800	19.08
Avtandil Ilduzovich Kulbarakov	Independent	7,461	18.25
Damira Abaskanovna Niyazalieva	Independent	6,440	15.76
Nurlan Beyshenbekovich Kerimkulov	Independent	3,107	7.60
Aybek Orozbekovich Alymjanov	Independent	2,063	5.05
Mayrambek Jekshenovich Asanbaev	Independent	1,001	2.45
Ayjan Ryskulovna Omoldoshova	Independent	649	1.59
Aktan Ayilchievich Ajymambetov	Independent	496	1.21
Sabyrbek Sardarbekov	Independent	488	1.19
Attokyr Asanalievich Djapanov	Independent	443	1.08
Maksatbek Mederbekovich Turumbekov	Light of Faith	344	0.84
Sayranbek Keneshbekovich Jumaev	Independent	257	0.63
Syezdbek Jumashalievich Turdubaev	Independent	110	0.27
Against all		793	1.94
Total		40,871	100.00
Valid votes		40,871	97.83
Invalid/blank votes		907	2.17
Total votes		41,778	100.00
Registered voters/turnout		104,084	40.14

№33 Naryn
Candidate	Party	Votes	%
Ulan Bolotbekovich Bakasov	Independent	19,621	54.63
Almazbek Baatyrbekovich Baatyrbekov	Independent	7,701	21.44
Melisbek Abdrasulovich Djunusov	Independent	1,583	4.41
Akylbek Ablabekovich Sariev	Independent	1,491	4.15
Samat Shamusaevich Ayankulov	Independent	1,187	3.31
Chyngyz Kaparovich Kaparov	Independent	904	2.52
Rayimbek Jumagulovich Abdyldaev	Independent	821	2.29
Esenbek Tokonovich Kyljyrov	Independent	507	1.41
Orozobek Kaparbekovich Madinov	Independent	336	0.94
Toygonbay Seyitkazievich Djaanbaev	Independent	137	0.38
Against all		1,625	4.52
Total		35,913	100.00
Valid votes		35,913	97.56
Invalid/blank votes		900	2.44
Total votes		36,813	100.00
Registered voters/turnout		104,720	35.15

№34 Jeti-Ögüz
Candidate	Party	Votes	%
Arslanbek Kasymakunovich Maliyev	Independent	7,337	18.82
Muratbek Kubanychbekovich Ismailov	Independent	5,096	13.07
Samatbek Kulukeevich Ibraev	Independent	3,373	8.65
Atyr Bolotbekovna Abdrakhmatova	Independent	3,293	8.45
Akyl Kanatbekovich Kemelov	Independent	2,908	7.46
Jekshen Esenbekovich Sulaev	Independent	2,406	6.17
Ruslan Tolonovich Eshmambetov	Independent	2,368	6.07
Talantbek Rysbekovich Japarov	Independent	1,889	4.85
Bakyt Talantovich Tologonov	Independent	1,515	3.89
Baktybek Kubatovich Aytakunov	Independent	1,348	3.46
Damir Cherikovich Mongoldorov	Independent	1,266	3.25
Manas Kadyrovich Alymov	Independent	1,155	2.96
Erkingul Bekbachaevna Imankojoeva	Independent	827	2.12
Arystanbek Melisovich Omuraliev	Independent	823	2.11
Zamirbek Kazakbai uulu	Independent	796	2.04
Kanat Rayimbekovich Sagymbaev	Independent	678	1.74
Bolotbek Muratbekovich Shamyrkanov	Independent	339	0.87
Against all		1,563	4.01
Total		38,980	100.00
Valid votes		38,980	97.70
Invalid/blank votes		918	2.30
Total votes		39,898	100.00
Registered voters/turnout		108,424	36.80

№35 Ak-Suu
Candidate	Party	Votes	%
Akylbek Toguzbaevich Tümönbaev	Independent	16,181	45.59
Alfira Iliyasovna Supataeva	Independent	3,878	10.93
Adil Jankorozovich Kanimetov	Independent	3,020	8.51
Akbarbek Sadyrbekovich Barakov	Independent	2,197	6.19
Ishenbay Kurmanovich Moldotashev	Independent	2,181	6.15
Kuban Bolotbekovich Musaliev	Independent	1,601	4.51
Tynchtykbek Kalmakovich Sarybaev	Independent	911	2.57
Omurbek Ayapbergenovich Bolturukov	Independent	785	2.21
Taalaybek Dyushekeevich Abdyldaev	Independent	625	1.76
Amanboldu Mederbekovich Januzakov	Independent	616	1.74
Against all		3,496	9.85
Total		35,491	100.00
Valid votes		35,491	97.21
Invalid/blank votes		1,020	2.79
Total votes		36,511	100.00
Registered voters/turnout		118,457	30.82

№36 Issyk-Kul
Candidate	Party	Votes	%
Maksatbek Kanatbekovich Sarbagyshev	Independent	5,887	21.78
Talantbek Kydyrgazievich Sarbagyshev	Independent	4,053	14.99
Mirlan Ilyichevich Maratov	Independent	3,047	11.27
Akjoltoy Shakirbekovich Tukunov	Independent	2,512	9.29
Talgat Chynybekovich Suranaliev	Independent	2,076	7.68
Jangyl Beyshenovna Adjybaeva	Independent	1,897	7.02
Kanat Zerlikovich Khasanov	Independent	1,784	6.60
Nazgul Turatbekovna Mamytova	Independent	1,157	4.28
Taalaybek Aytbaevich Orozbaev	Independent	963	3.56
Anara Khamzaevna Mambetalieva	Independent	656	2.43
Mirbek Jangybaevich Imerov	Independent	454	1.68
Iskender Erkinovich Amanbaev	Independent	333	1.23
Against all		2,213	8.19
Total		27,032	100.00
Valid votes		27,032	97.30
Invalid/blank votes		751	2.70
Total votes		27,783	100.00
Registered voters/turnout		89,726	30.96

== Reactions ==
After the announcement of preliminary results of the vote, opposition parties denounced the election at a protest held in Bishkek on 29 November 2021, citing alleged electoral fraud that occurred during the counting as a blackout at the tabulation screen had shown several parties falling below the 5% electoral threshold. Omurbek Tekebayev, leader of the Ata Meken Socialist Party, called for the results to be annulled once again, just as in the previous parliamentary election. In response to the allegations, CEC chairwoman Nurjan Shyldabekova asserted that the malfunction had occurred only at the monitor display and not within the counting process, which would have affected the results.

On 1 December 2021, Omurbek Tekebayev was attacked by unknown persons at a restaurant. In response, Tekebayev linked the incident to his activities, calling it "political terror".
