= Eldik =

"Eldik" Deputy Group «Элдик» депутаттык тобу
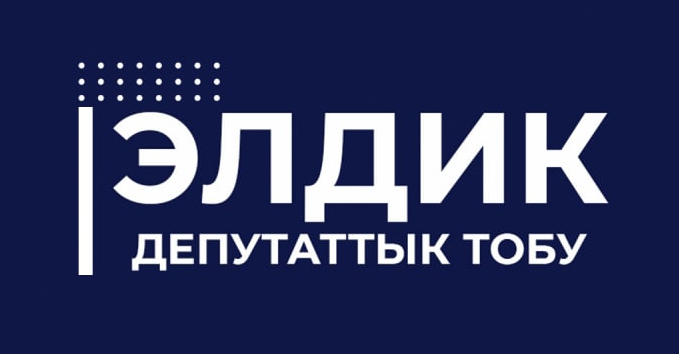
- Leader: Akylbek Tumonbayev
- Founded: 29 December 2021
- Membership (2025): 18
- Colours: Blue
- Supreme Council: 18 / 90

Website
- Facebook page

The Eldik (Kyrgyz: Элдик, lit. 'People's') is a parliamentary faction in the 7th Jogorku Kenesh of Kyrgyzstan, consisting of single-mandate deputies elected in the 2021 parliamentary election.

== History ==
The group was formed at the first session of the elected parliament on 29 December 2021. Deputy Akylbek Tumonbayev became the leader of the group.

== Current composition ==
This list contains the current composition of the parliamentary group.

Constituency		Deputy	Party	Birth year
Batken Region	Leylek	Chingiz Ajibayev	Single-mandate deputy	1991
Chüy Region	Zhayyl	Nurlanbek Azygaliyev	Single-mandate deputy	1985
Osh Region	Kok-Zhar	Omurbek Bakirov	Single-mandate deputy	1978
Jalal-Abad Region	Suzak	Tazabek Ikramov	Single-mandate deputy	1974
Chüy Region	Sokuluk	Amankan Kenjebaev	Single-mandate deputy	1967
Issyk-Kul Region	Djeti-Oguz	Arslanbek Maliyev	Single-mandate deputy	1957
Osh Region	Aravan	Jalolidin Nurbayev	Single-mandate deputy	1971
Batken Region	Batken	Nurlan Rajabaliyev	Single-mandate deputy	1975
Naryn Region	Kochkor	Mirlan Samyikojo	Single-mandate deputy	1984
Issyk-Kul Region	Issyk-Kul	Maksatbek Sarbagyshev	Single-mandate deputy	1985
Chüy Region	Issyk-Ata	Akbokon Tashtanbekov	Afghan Party (SMD)	1963
Issyk-Kul Region	Ak-Suy	Akylbek Tumonbayev	Single-mandate deputy	1972
Talas Region	Talas	Baktybek Choibekov	Single-mandate deputy	1977
