= Party of Veterans of the Afghan War =

Political Party of Veterans of the War in Afghanistan and Participants of Other Local Military Conflicts Афганистан согушунун ардагерлери жана ушул сыяктуу кагышууларга катышкандардын партиясы
- Abbreviation: Afghans' Party
- Leader: Akbokon Tashtanbekov
- Founded: 14 October 1994
- Registered: 13 September 1999
- Headquarters: Chiu Prospect, 4-a. Bishkek
- Ideology: Veterans' rights Social conservatism
- National affiliation: Eldik
- Colours: Brown
- Jogorku Kenesh: 1 / 90

Website
- partiya-afganzev.kg

The Political Party of Veterans of the War in Afghanistan and Participants of Other Local Military Conflicts (Kyrgyz: Афганистан согушунун ардагерлери жана ушул сыяктуу кагышууларга катышкандардын партиясы, romanized: Afganistan sogushunun ardagerleri jana ushul syyaktuu kagyshuularga katyshkandardyn partiyasy Russian: Политическая партия Ветеранов войны в Афганистане и Участников других локальных боевых конфликтов, romanized: Politicheskaya partiya Veteranov voyny v Afganistane i Uchastnikov drugikh lokalnykh boyevykh konfliktov), often shortened to the Afghans' Party (Kyrgyz: Афганистандын партиясы, romanized: Afganistandyn partiyasy Russian: Партия афганцев, romanized: Partiya afgantsev), is a political party in Kyrgyzstan representing the interests of veterans of the Soviet-Afghan War and other military conflicts.

In the 2021 parliamentary election, party leader Akbokon Tashtanbekov won in single-mandate constituency №30 and became a deputy.

== Election results ==
=== Jogorku Kenesh ===
Election	Leader	Votes	%	Seats	+/–	Government
2000	Akbokon Tashtanbekov	131,933	8.51 (#4)	2 / 105		Support
2010	Akbokon Tashtanbekov			0 / 120		Extra-parliamentary
2020	Akbokon Tashtanbekov	3,459	0.18 (#16)	0 / 120		Elections annulled
2021	Akbokon Tashtanbekov	single-mandate	single-mandate	1 / 90		TBD

== See also ==
- Party of Veterans of Afghanistan Ukrainian Afghan War Veteran's party
