= Cholpon Sultanbekova =

Kyrgyz politician (born 1969)

- Чолпон Султанбекова

Deputy Prime Minister of Kyrgyzstan
- In office 11 November 2016 – 20 April 2018
- President: Almazbek Atambayev; Sooronbay Jeenbekov
- Prime Minister: Sooronbay Jeenbekov; Muhammetkaliy Abulgaziyev (acting); Sapar Isakov
- Preceded by: Gulmira Kudaiberdieva
- Succeeded by: Altinai Omurbekova

Personal details
- Born: 19 August 1969 (age 56) Frunze, Kirghiz SSR, USSR, (now Bishkek, Kyrgyzstan)
- Spouse: Bayaman Erkinbaev (deceased)
- Children: 3

Cholpon Aalievna Sultanbekova (Kyrgyz: Чолпон Аалыевна Султанбекова, Çolpon Aalıevna (Aalı qızı) Sultanbekova; born 19 August 1969) is a Kyrgyz politician and ex-member of the Supreme Council who served as one the country's Deputy Prime Ministers.

== Early life and education ==
Sultanbekova was born on 19 August 1969 in Bishkek (then Frunze). She attended the Michurinsky Pedagogical Institute in Russia and graduated in law and international relations from the Kyrgyz State Academy of Law in 2006.

== Career ==
Sultanbekova worked at the registry office in Jalal-Abad before becoming Director General of Palvan in Osh in 1995. She was President of the Congress of Women of the Kyrgyz Republic in the Southern Region from 2000 until 2001 and in 2005 she founded the NGO Eco-Harmony of Women.

Sultanbekova is a member of the Respublika Party of Kyrgyzstan. After her husband's assassination in 2005, she ran for his parliamentary seat representing the Kadamjay District in a 2006 by-election but was defeated.

Sultanbekova was elected as a member of the Jogorku Kenesh in 2010. She became a member of the Committee on Education, Science, Culture and Sport and chair of the Committee of Youth Policy in 2012. In October 2013, she was elected Deputy Speaker of the parliament. From 25 January 2015 until 22 January 2017, she was a member of the Parliamentary Assembly of the Council of Europe.

On 9 November 2016, the parliament approved her nomination as Deputy Prime Minister for social affairs under Prime Minister Sooronbay Jeenbekov, replacing Gulmira Kudaiberdieva.
