= Light of Faith (political party) =

Light of Faith Ыйман нуру
- Leader: Nurzhigit Kadyrbekov
- Founder: Rais Alymkulov
- Founded: 25 April 2012
- Registered: 27 June 2012
- Headquarters: Bishkek
- Ideology: Islamic democracy; Populism; Reformism
- Political position: Centre-right
- Seats in the Supreme Council of Kyrgyzstan: 5 / 90 (2021)

Website
- nuru.kg

Light of Faith (Kyrgyz: Ыйман нуру, romanized: Iyman nuru), officially the Political Party for Justice and Development "Light of Faith" (Kyrgyz: “Ыйман Нуру” Адилетүүлүк жана өнүгүү саясий партиясы; Russian: Политическая партия справедливости и развития «Ыйман Нуру»,) and sometimes translated as Beam of Conscience or Ray of Faith, is a political party in Kyrgyzstan. The party participated in the 2020 parliamentary elections, in which they garnered 66,747 votes (3.1%), which was below the 7% electoral threshold. In the 2021 elections (for which the threshold was reduced to 5%), the party performed better, obtaining a 5.98% stake and five seats.
