= Ata Meken Socialist Party =

Ata-Meken Socialist Party Ата-Мекен Социалисттик Партиясы
- Leader: Omurbek Tekebayev
- Founded: November 1992
- Headquarters: Bishkek, Kyrgyzstan
- Ideology: Social democracy Third Way
- Political position: Centre-left
- Continental affiliation: Forum of Socialists of the CIS Countries
- Seats in the Supreme Council of Kyrgyzstan: 0 / 120

Website
- www.atameken.kg

The Ata-Meken Socialist Party (Kyrgyz: Ата-Мекен Социалисттик Партиясы, romanized: Ata-Meken Sotsialisttik Partiyası, lit. 'Fatherland Socialist Party'; sometimes shortened to simply Ata-Meken) is a social-democratic political party in Kyrgyzstan. Its current Chairman and founder is Omurbek Tekebayev, who is a former speaker of the Kyrgyz Parliament. The party was registered on December 16, 1992, following a split between Tekebayev (as well as more moderate party members) and the conservative Erkin Kyrgyzstan party. Ata-Meken eventually moved into the centre-left of the political spectrum.

The party's platform calls for a democratic state, economic reforms, and evolutionary social development. It favors reasonable compromise between various social sectors and government bodies. The party supported Tekebayev in the 2000 Presidential elections, where he came second with 14%.

On May 20, 2004, the party joined the For Fair Elections electoral alliance in preparing for the February 2005 parliamentary elections. The party won one seat in the first round of the 2005 parliamentary elections.

In the December 2007 parliamentary elections, despite receiving more than 10% of the total vote, Ata-Meken won no seats in parliament. This was due to a requirement that a party had to obtain at least 0.5% of the vote in each of the country's seven regions and its two cities (Bishkek and Osh) in order to win representation. According to official counts, Ata-Meken failed this requirement in Osh. Ata-Meken accused the Central Electoral Commission of Kyrgyzstan of falsifying these results to deny them representation.

Ata-Meken received the votes of 5.6% of eligible voters in the 2010 parliamentary elections, giving it 18 of 120 seats in parliament. This result made the party the fifth of five parties to surpass the support threshold of 5% of eligible voters necessary to enter parliament.

== See also ==
- Natalya Nikitenko
