= United Kyrgyzstan =

United Kyrgyzstan Бүтүн Кыргызстан
- Leader: Adakhan Madumarov
- Founded: 1 December 2006
- Registered: 2010
- Headquarters: 109/1 Turusbekov Street, Bishkek
- Ideology: National conservatism; Ethnic nationalism
- Political position: Centre-right to right-wing
- National affiliation: Ak Jol (2007–2010)
- Colors: Red; White; Blue
- Supreme Council: 6 / 90 (2021)

Party flag

Website
- butun.kg

United Kyrgyzstan (Kyrgyz: Бүтүн Кыргызстан, romanized: Bütün Kyrgyzstan) is a nationalist political party in Kyrgyzstan founded in 2010. It is generally more popular in the south of the country. The party is led by Adakhan Madumarov, who unsuccessfully ran for president of Kyrgyzstan in 2011 and 2017, coming second and third, respectively. It holds an ethnic nationalist ideology and supports a presidential system of government. The party was originally created to support Kyrgyz migrant laborers in Russia. The party won its first seats in the Supreme Council in the October 2020 parliamentary election, which was subsequently annulled. The party passed the 3% threshold in the 2021 parliamentary election and therefore is represented in the national legislature.

== History ==
Initially, the political party was created to support Kyrgyz migrant workers in Russia. United Kyrgyzstan won its first seats in parliament in the 2020 elections, which, however, the party itself did not recognize, and after the protests, the voting results were declared invalid. After the elections, United Kyrgyzstan entered the Coordinating Council of the Opposition of Kyrgyzstan.

The party was founded before the 2010 parliamentary election, and party chairman became Adakhan Madumarov, a former deputy from the Ata-Zhurt party. After its founding, the party received support from several members of parliament, including primarily supporters of former President Kurmanbek Bakiyev and delegates from Ata-Zhurt, which is also aligned with national conservatives. In the 2010 parliamentary elections, the party came in sixth place with 140,000 votes, but failed to enter parliament due to the 5% hurdle. In the 2011 presidential election, the party nominated its own candidate for the first time, Madumarov, who received 14.7% of the votes cast, the second most votes behind the winner Almazbek Atambayev.

In the 2015 parliamentary election, the party ran in an electoral alliance with the Emgek party, but once again failed to enter the Kyrgyz parliament with 6.14% of the votes cast, as a 7% threshold applied in the parliamentary election. In the 2017 presidential election, the party was again represented by party chairman Madumarov, who came in third behind election winner Sooronbay Jeenbekov and challenger Ömürbek Babanov.

In the run-up to the 2020 parliamentary election, a controversy developed over the registration of United Kyrgyzstan by the Central Election Commission. On September 3, the commission announced that it would not register the party for the election, citing evidence of manipulation of the signatures of supporters needed for registration. The party leadership then filed a complaint with the Administrative Court in Bishkek, which demanded that the party be admitted to the election, whereupon the Election Commission finally admitted United Kyrgyzstan to the election. In the election on October 4, 2020, the party received 7.3% of the votes cast and would thus have entered the Kyrgyz parliament for the first time. However, due to the annulment of the election results as a result of mass protests after the election, the parliament of the previous legislative period without the participation of United Kyrgyzstan remained unchanged until the next election in the summer of 2021.

== Notable members ==
- Jenish Moldokmatov
- Melis Turganbaye, former Deputy Minister of the Interior
- Almurza Satybalidiev
- Turdakun Usubaliev, First Secretary of the Central Committee of the Communist Party of Kirghizia between 1961 and 1985.
- Asanbek Alymkozhoev, former Chief of General Staff of Armed Forces of the Kyrgyz Republic
