= Mekenchil =

Mekenchil Мекенчил
- Leader: Sadyr Japarov
- Chairman: Kamchybek Tashiev
- Founded: 16 June 2010
- Split from: Ata-Zhurt
- Headquarters: Bishkek, Kyrgyzstan
- Ideology: Kyrgyz nationalism; National conservatism; Right-wing populism
- Political position: Right-wing
- Slogan: Бийлик – элге, Уурулар – түрмөгө Biilik – elge, Uurular – türmögö ('Power to the people, thieves to prison!')
- Seats in the Supreme Council of Kyrgyzstan: 19 / 90

Mekenchil, (Note: /ˌmɛkɛnˈtʃɪl/; Kyrgyz: Мекенчил [ˌmekʰeɲˈt͡ɕʰɪ́l]; lit. 'Patriot') officially the "Patriot" Political Party, (Note: Kyrgyz: «Мекенчил» саясий партиясы, romanized: «Mekenchil» saiasii partiasy) is a national conservative political party in Kyrgyzstan, which was founded in 2010.

== History ==
The Mekenchil was founded on 16 June 2010 by Sadyr Japarov and Kamchybek Tashiev; both were co-founders of the party. Mekenchil had close personal ties with the nationalist Ata-Zhurt party where several politicians moved from there to the separate new party.

Japarov served as the de facto leader of Mekenchil until his imprisonment in October 2013. Despite being arrested for the second time in 2017 and sentenced to several years in prison on the charges of attempted kidnapping, Japarov remained as one of the party leaders. In October 2020, the party for the first time participated in the 2020 parliamentary elections which was headed by Tashiev after Mekenchil submitted an application to the CEC for participation on 4 July 2020.

Following the 2020 Kyrgyzstani protests that led to the cancellation of the election results, Japarov was released from prison and from there, quickly mobilized a large following and gained influence through massive demonstrations in Bishkek and the support of numerous right-wing affiliated MP's of Supreme Council. On 10 October 2020, Japarov was elected as the Prime Minister. After the resignation of President Sooronbay Jeenbekov, Japarov became the acting president. With his rise to power, the Mekenchil party as a whole gained influence, with several politicians or close supporters of the party occupying important positions, including Tashiev, who was appointed head of the State Committee for National Security on 16 October 2020.

On 23 February 2021, Mekenchil officials reported that the party would not participate in the 2021 parliamentary elections and local council elections. Instead, a new party named Ata-Zhurt Kyrgyzstan will campaign for seats in the Parliament. Adinai Maripova stressed that this party has nothing to do with the Ata-Zhurt that the Mekenchil split itself from.

On 6 October 2022, the parliamentary group "Mekenchil" was created from single-mandate deputies who broke away from the group "Ata-Jurt Kyrgyzstan".

== Political stances ==
The following are some of the political stances held by the party:

- Direct elections of members of district and city courts
- Allowing the Supreme Council to screen judges of oblasts and the Supreme Court
- Transfer the headquarters of the Border Service to Osh
- Allowing the people to determine their chosen form of government through a referendum
- Changing the electoral system for legislative elections from a region-based proportional representation one electing 120 total members to one based on single-member districts which elect 75 total members
- Restoration of the death penalty, which was abolished in 2007
- Introduction of a "People's Kurultai"
- Allowing dual citizenship

== Electoral history ==
=== Presidential elections ===
Election	Nominee	Votes	%	Result
2021	Sadyr Japarov	1,105,248	79.83%	Elected ✓

=== Parliamentary elections ===
Party leader	Election	Votes	%	Seats	Position	Government
Sadyr Japarov; Kamchybek Tashiev	2020	136,276	6.96%	0 / 120	New	Extra-parliamentary
