= Central Electoral Commission of Kyrgyzstan =

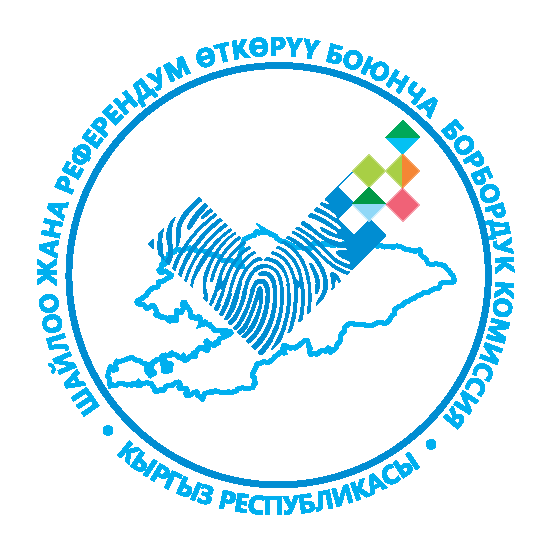
Emblem of the Central Election Commission of Kyrgyzstan

The Central Electoral Commission of Kyrgyzstan, officially the Central Commission on Elections and Referenda of the Kyrgyz Republic (Kyrgyz: Кыргыз республикасынын шайлоо жана референдум өткөрүү боюнча борбордук комиссиясы, romanized: Kırgız respublikasının şayloo jana referendum ötkörüü boyunça borborduk komissiyası), is the body in Kyrgyzstan responsible for the running of elections. In the run up to the 2007 Kyrgyz Parliamentary elections the Commission was accused of suppressing the political opponents of President Kurmanbek Bakiyev.
