= Yntymak (political party) =

Cohesion Ынтымак
- Leader: Chingiz Makeshov
- Founded: 4 October 2012
- Headquarters: Altymyshev 165, Leninsky District, Bishkek
- Ideology: Social conservatism
- Colours: Cyan; Orange
- Jogorku Kenesh: 3 / 90

Website
- yntymak2021.kg

Yntymak (Kyrgyz: Ынтымак; lit. 'Cohesion') is a pro-Japarov political party in Kyrgyzstan.

According to the preliminary results of the 2021 parliamentary election, the party came in third with 10 seats.

== Election results ==
=== Parliamentary elections ===
Election	Leader	Votes	%	Seats	+/–	Rank	Government
2021	Chingiz Makeshov	142,262	12.13	9 / 90	New	3rd	Support
2025	Chingiz Makeshov	40,260	2.72	3 / 90	▼6	1st	Support
