= Alliance (Kyrgyz political party) =

Alliance Альянс
- Leader: Mirlan Jeenchoroyev
- Founded: 12 October 2021
- Merger of: A Just Kyrgyzstan; Bir Bol; Kyrgyz Liberal Democratic Party
- Ideology: Liberalism; Populism
- Political position: Centre to centre-left
- Colours: Blue
- Jogorku Kenesh: 7 / 90 (2021)

Website
- Facebook page

Alliance (Kyrgyz: Альянс, romanized: Alyans) is a political party in Kyrgyzstan formed by the merger of A Just Kyrgyzstan, Bir Bol and the Kyrgyz Liberal Democratic Party.

The leader of the party is Mirlan Jeenchoroyev, who previously led the party Respublika in the 2020 parliamentary election.

According to the preliminary results of the 2021 parliamentary election, the party came in fourth with eight seats.
