= Ishenim =

Trust Ишеним
- Leader: Azamat Doroyev
- Founded: 10 October 2011
- Ideology: Communitarism
- Political position: Centre-right
- Colours: Blue; Purple
- Jogorku Kenesh: 12 / 90 (2021)

Website
- ishenim-team.kg

Ishenim (Kyrgyz: Ишеним; lit. 'Trust' or 'Belief') is a pro-Japarov political party in Kyrgyzstan.

According to the preliminary results of the 2021 parliamentary election, the party came in second with 12 seats.
