= Adakhan Madumarov =

Kyrgyz politician (born 1965)

- Адахан Мадумаров
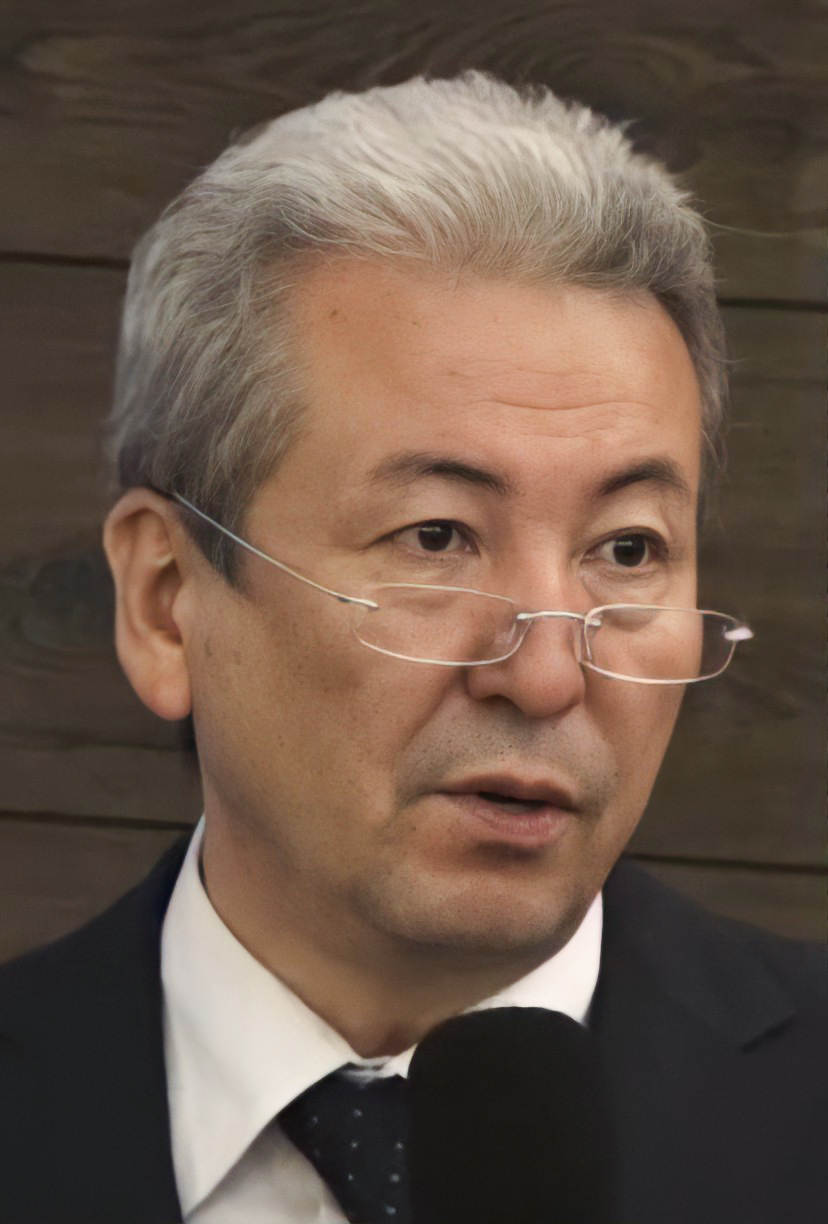
- Madumarov in 2017

Chairman of United Kyrgyzstan
- Incumbent
- Assumed office 2010

Member of the Supreme Council
- In office 1995–2005

Personal details
- Born: 9 March 1965 (age 61) Kurshab, Uzgen District, Kirghiz SSR, Soviet Union
- Party: United Kyrgyzstan
- Other political affiliations: Ak Jol
- Children: 2
- Education: Tver State University; Kyrgyz National University
- Occupation: Politician; historian; lawyer; teacher

Adakhan Kimsanbayevich Madumarov (Kyrgyz: Адахан Кимсанбаевич Мадумаров; born 9 March 1965) is a Kyrgyz lawyer, historian, and politician, who serves as the party chairman of United Kyrgyzstan since 2010, and previously served as a member of the Supreme Council of Kyrgyzstan from 1995 to 2005.

== Early life and education ==
Adakhan Kumsanbavevich Madumarov was born on 9 March 1965 in the village of Kurshab, a town in the Osh Oblast of what was then the Kirghiz Soviet Socialist Republic in the Soviet Union. After graduating high school in Kurshab, he worked as a farmer in his home district of Uzgen.

In 1987, Madumarov attended Tver State University, and in 1992 he received a diploma of a historian-teacher of history and political science. He also became a Republican Press Minister, and then took the post as editor-in-chief of the Turk Alamy. He led an editorial on child and youth programs at the Republican State National Broadcasting Company. In 1999, Madumarov graduated from Kyrgyz National University.

== Political career ==
=== Supreme Council ===
In the 1995 Kyrgyz parliamentary election, Adakhan Madumarov was elected to the Supreme Council, the parliament of the newly established Kyrgyz Republic. During his tenure, he led the committee on social policy, labor and veterans. He would serve in the Supreme Council until 2005.

=== Presidential campaigns ===
Madumarov unsuccessfully ran for president in 2005, 2011, 2017, and 2021.

== Political positions ==
Madumarov opposes the constitutional reforms proposed by Sadyr Japarov.

He does not accept the results of the 2021 Kyrgyz presidential election.
