= Elmira Ibraimova =

Kyrgyz civil servant, politician and deputy prime minister

- Эльмира Ибраимова
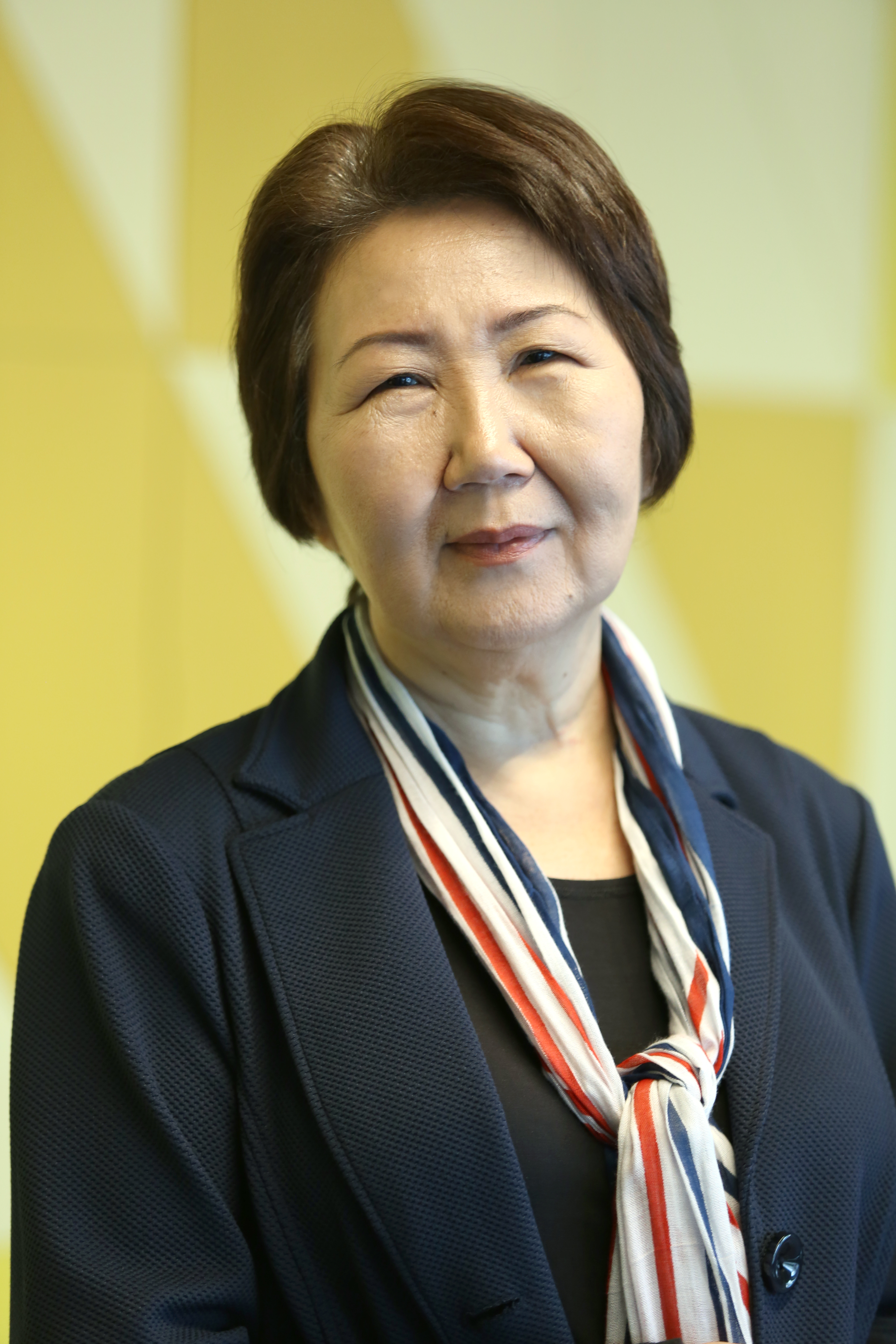
- Ibraimova in 2021

Deputy Prime Minister of Kyrgyzstan
- In office May 2008 – January 2009
- Prime Minister: Igor Chudinov

Personal details
- Born: 13 April 1962 (age 64) Frunze, Kirghiz SSR, Soviet Union (now Bishkek, Kyrgyzstan)
- Party: Ak Jol (2007–2009)
- Parent: Sultan Ibraimov
- Relatives: Ainura Ibraimova (sister))
- Education: Moscow State University; University of Massachusetts Amherst

Elmira Sultan kyzy Ibraimova (Эльмира Султан кызы Ибраимова; born 13 April 1962) is a Kyrgyzstani former civil servant and politician who was Deputy Prime Minister of Kyrgyzstan in Igor Chudinov's government following the Tulip Revolution.

== Early life and career ==
Elmira Sultanovna Ibraimova was born in Frunze (now Bishkek), then part of the Kirghiz Soviet Socialist Republic. At the time, her father, Sultan Ibraimov, was minister of Land Reclamation and Water Management in the government of Bolot Mambetov. She studied at Moscow State University and obtained a master's degree in political economics in June 1984. She then worked seven years (1984–1991) in an electronic machinery plant in Frunze, rising to senior economist in its research & development section. From 1986 to 1991 she was also second secretary of one of the district committees of the Komsomol in Frunze.

== Civil service ==
Following the dissolution of the Soviet Union Ibraimova joined the Kyrgyz civil service in May 1991, where she served until October 1996. There she held various positions in the administration of the Supreme Council, culminating with that of Head of the General Administration Department and then Chief of the Secretariat. This service was interrupted from September 1993 to April 1995 when she studied with a Muskie Fellowship at the University of Massachusetts Amherst and obtained a master's degree in public administration. From October 1996 until December 1998 she was auditor of the Supreme Council in the Supreme Auditing Chamber, and subsequently from December 1998 to September 1999 she was Deputy Chief of the Foreign Policy Department in the Presidential Administration.

From September 1999 through April 2001, she was Kyrgyzstan's Permanent Representative and Ambassador Extraordinary and Plenipotentiary to the United Nations.

Following a year without a government appointment, she was named in May 2002 to head the preparation unit for the Village Investment Project under the Prime Minister's Administration, and from October 2003 until 2007 she was executive director of the Community Development and Investment Agency (Agentstvo Razvitiya i Investirovaniya Soobshestv – ARIS) of Kyrgyzstan, established to implement this and subsequent rural and community development projects. Under her leadership ARIS became the main agency for implementing foreign aided projects in the rural communities of the country. In 2005 Ibraimova was one of the recipients of the Prize for Women's Creativity in Rural Life, awarded annually by the Women's World Summit Foundation in Geneva, Switzerland.

When President Kurmanbek Bakiyev, who had come to power in the wake of the Tulip Revolution in 2005, formed the Ak Jol party in October 2007, he asked her to join and to serve as one of its co-chairs. The party won 71 of the 90 seats in the Supreme Council in the 2007 elections, and Ibraimova became leader of its parliamentary faction. She subsequently served in Prime Minister Igor Chudinov's cabinet first as Deputy Minister of Foreign Affairs (2007–May 2008) and then as Deputy Prime Minister responsible for the social sectors. She resigned from this position in January 2009 over policy differences and was expelled from Ak Jol for publicly criticizing President Bakiyev's policies.

In the provisional government under President Roza Otunbayeva and Prime Minister Almazbek Atambayev of the Social Democratic Party of Kyrgyzstan, formed after the Kyrgyz Revolution of 2010 and governing until 31 December 2011, Ibraimova was briefly one of its members as Coordinator of the Social Sector, Public Relations and Mass Media, until she was reappointed in 2010 to her old position as executive director of ARIS. In November 2012 she was appointed chair of the Chamber of Accounts of Kyrgyzstan, where she served until retiring in 2016.
