= Bakyt Torobayev =

Kyrgyz politician (born 1973)

- Бакыт Төрөбаев
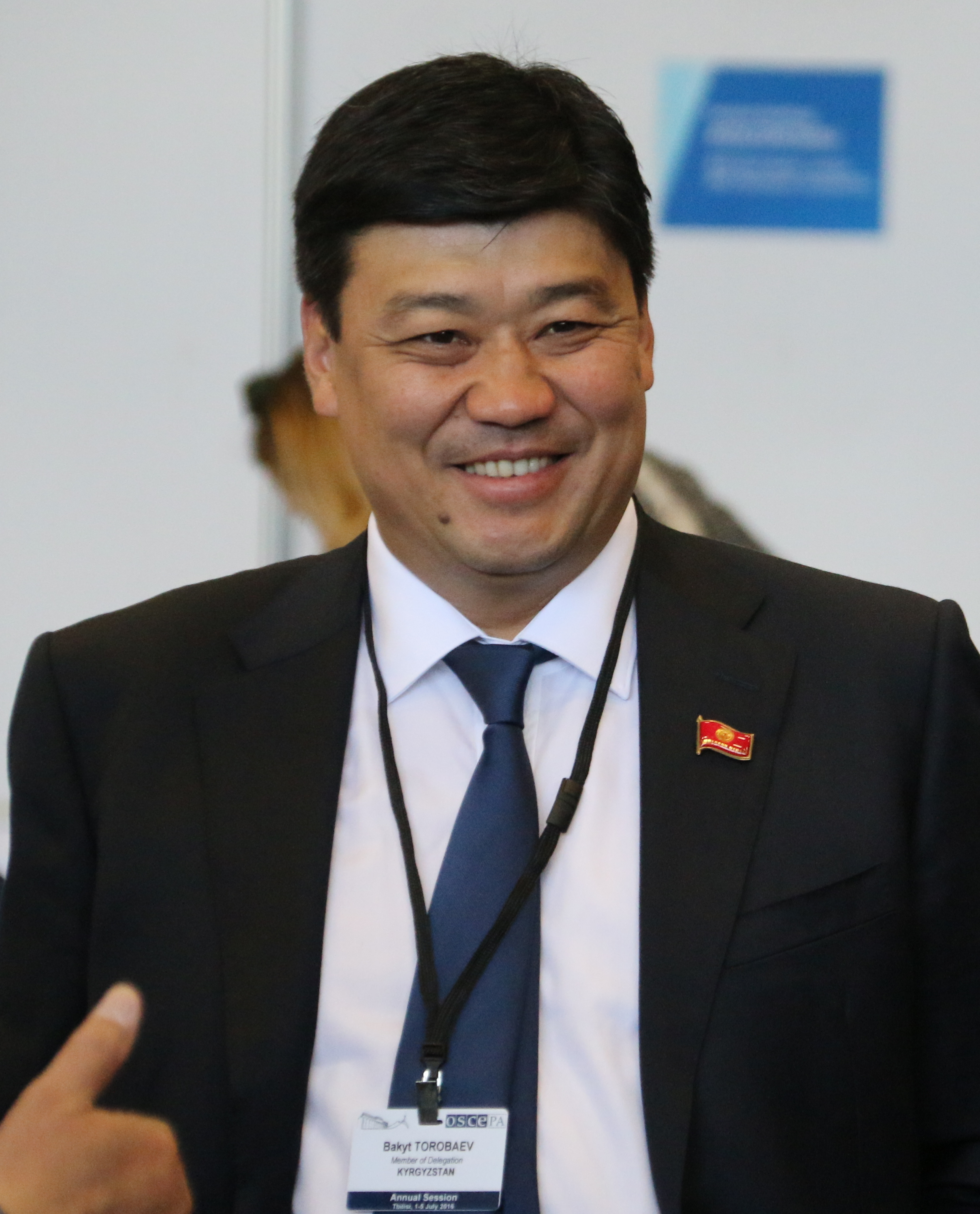
- Torobayev in 2016

Leader of Onuguu–Progress
- Incumbent
- Assumed office 25 April 2013
- Preceded by: position established

Minister of Emergency Situations
- In office 15 December 2009 – 2010

Member of the Supreme Council of Kyrgyzstan
- Incumbent
- Assumed office 16 December 2007

Personal details
- Born: Bakyt Ergeshevich Torobayev; April 5, 1973 (age 53) Jalal-Abad, Kirgiz SSR, Soviet Union (now Kyrgyzstan)
- Party: Ak Zhol (2007–2010); Respublika Party of Kyrgyzstan (2010–2012); Onuguu–Progress (2012–present)
- Children: 5
- Parent: Ergesh Torobayev (father)
- Education: Kyrgyz State National University

Bakyt Ergeshevich Torobayev (Kyrgyz: Бакыт Эргешевич Төрөбаев, Russian: Бакыт Эргешевич Торобаев, born 5 April 1973) is a Kyrgyz politician who has been the leader of the Onuguu-Progress party since 2013.

After working in various managerial roles, Torobayev was elected as a deputy for the Supreme Council of Kyrgyzstan in the 2007 parliamentary election, joining Kurmanbek Bakiyev's Ak Zhol party. After the 2010 Kyrgyz revolution in which Bakiyev was overthrown, he joined the Respublika Party of Kyrgyzstan, but clashed with party leader Omurbek Babanov, leading him to join Onuguu-Progress.

Torobayev was also an official candidate for the 2017 presidential election in Kyrgyzstan, until he withdrew nine days before the start of the election.

== Early life, education and managerial career ==
Torobayev was born on 5 April 1973 in the city of Jalal-Abad, in south-west Kyrgyzstan (then the Soviet republic of the Kirgiz SSR). He started work in 1995 as a director of Zhamlia i K, a Kazakhstan-based production and commercial company, specialising in the sale of petroleum products and the construction of filling stations. Between 1998 and 1999, he worked on a farm named "Asia-Suzak" as its chairman.

He also, in 1999, graduated from the economics faculty of the Kyrgyz State National University with a degree in finance and credit. Between 2000 and 2009, he worked as the CEO of Mariam, a flour factory.

== Political career ==
Torobayev entered the Supreme Council after the 2007 parliamentary election as a member of Kurmanbek Bakiyev's Ak Zhol party. From 15 December 2009 to 2010, he was the Minister of Emergency Situations, which included the period of the 2010 Kyrgyz revolution. After the overthrow of Bakiyev, Torobayev joined the Respublika Party of Kyrgyzstan, led by Omurbek Babanov. However, Torobayev and Babanov frequently clashed in the party, which led to Torobayev leaving Respublika and founding Onuguu–Progress.

In 2016, Torobayev stood as a candidate for speaker of the Supreme Council, along with Kanat Isayev of the Kyrgyzstan Party. Both failed to receive the required 61 votes to become speaker, as Isayev and Torobayev received 51 votes each.

=== Onuguu–Progress ===
Originally a political movement, Onuguu–Progress held its first congress on 1 February 2012, and it was formally registered as a party sixteen days later. At its second congress, on 23 April 2015, it elected Torobayev as its leader. The party first stood candidates in the 2015 parliamentary election, winning 13 of the 120 seats in the Supreme Council, coming fourth.

As leader of the party, Torobayev supports the strengthening of Kyrgyzstan's parliamentary democracy and transfer of more powers from the office of the president to the office of the prime minister, while at the same time stating that "[continued discussion of whether to have a presidential or parliamentary system has] really tired people with [such] business." He has placed himself and the party under a "centrist" and "neoconservative" label, supporting property rights, a market economy and more political competition.

=== 2017 presidential campaign ===
On 10 February 2017, Torobayev confirmed that he was running in the 2017 presidential elections; on 27 June delegates from his own party unanimously confirmed that he was running under the Onuguu–Progress name.

After his confirmation, he tried twice to broker deals with other parties and politicians; the first in August when Torobayev announced that Onuguu–Progress would merge with two other parties, Mekenim-Kyrgyzstan and Respublika–Ata Zhurt, in an attempt to receive a better electoral vote, and to allow all three party leaders a government post if their candidate were to be elected president. On 4 September he announced that a conference would be held a week later to formally announce the presidential candidate of the new party, named as "Kaira Zharaluy", but the merger failed, as Respubika–Ata Zhurt chairman Kamchybek Tashiyev decided to support the Social Democratic Party of Kyrgyzstan for the elections. Six days later Torobayev joined up with Omurbek Babanov, agreeing that should Babanov win, he would become prime minister. Initially one of the thirteen registered candidates, Torobayev eventually withdrew from the race on 6 October.

Torobayev's campaign was based upon the creation of a "dictatorship of law", where he would promote creation of jobs, especially for young people, and making sure that citizens feel "legally and socially" protected, an attempt to appeal to the city-dwelling entrepreneurial class and also to the burgeoning traditionalist electorate. He did not take up his 15-minute airtime slot on OTRK, Kyrgyzstan's national broadcaster, after the station accused his supporters of bribing voters.

=== Post-election ===
From the fallout of Babanov failing to secure the presidency, three deputies from his party attempted to launch a leadership challenge against Torobayev; an internal vote subsequently expelled them from the party, and the newspaper Vecherny Bishkek, described by analysis site EurasiaNet as a 'privately owned government mouthpiece', made comments about how Torobayev may "lose control [...] over the Onuguu-Progress faction".

== Personal life ==
Torobayev is married with five children. He has four brothers and one sister, Askarali, who works as deputy chairman for the State Service for Combating Economic Crimes, and Batyr, who heads the association of millers at the Union of Entrepreneurs of the Republic.
