= 2011 Kyrgyz presidential election =

- 30 October 2011
- Registered: 3,032,666
- Turnout: 61.29% (▼17.91pp)
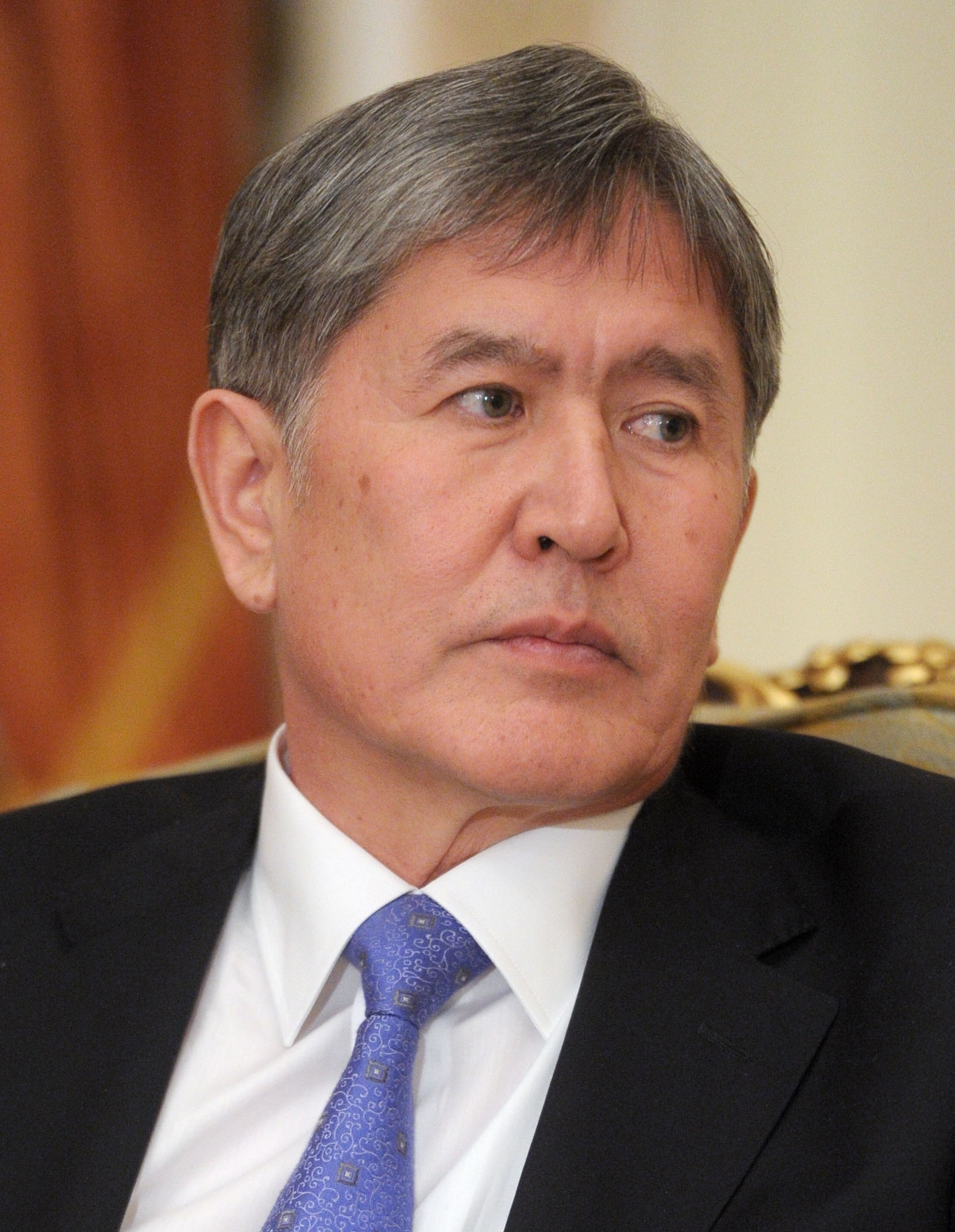

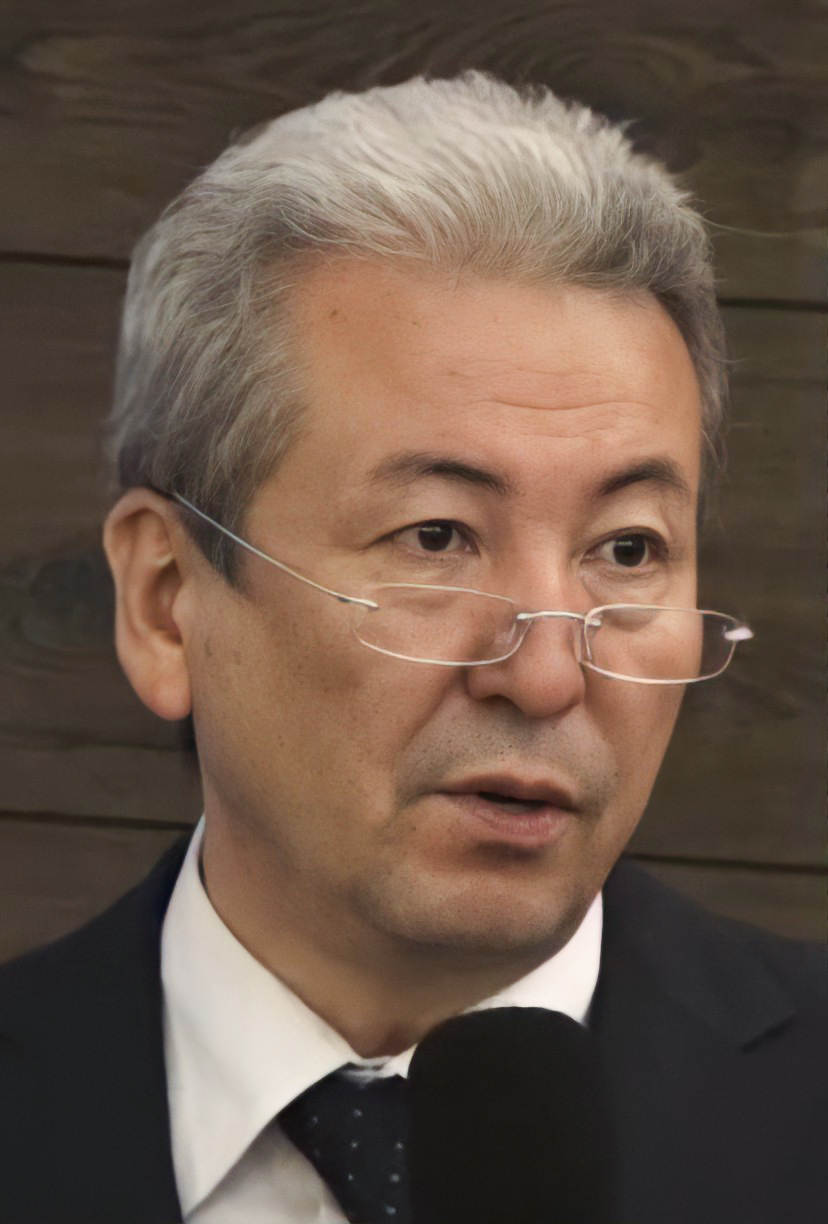

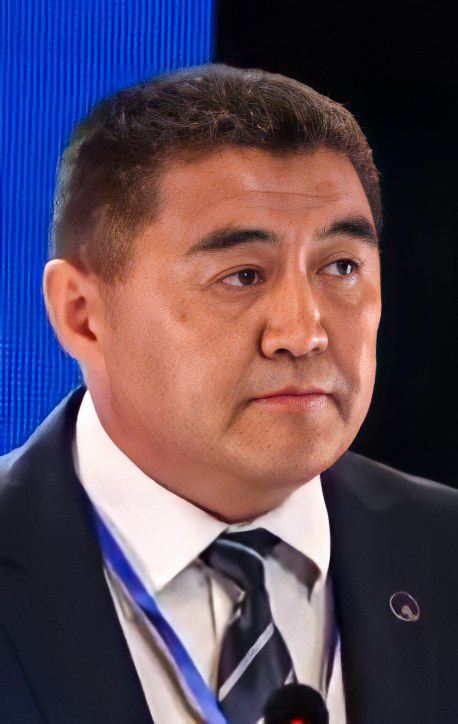
Nominee	Almazbek Atambayev	Adakhan Madumarov	Kamchybek Tashiev
Party	SDPK	Butun Kyrgyzstan	Ata-Zhurt
Popular vote	1,161,929	274,639	266,189
Percentage	63.83%	15.09%	14.62%
- Results by district
President before election
Roza Otunbayeva
SDPK
Elected President
Almazbek Atambayev
SDPK

Early presidential elections were held in Kyrgyzstan on 30 October 2011 to replace Interim President Roza Otunbayeva. Former Prime Minister Almazbek Atambayev of the Social Democratic Party of Kyrgyzstan won in the first round.

== Background ==
The election followed the 2010 Kyrgyzstani riots, during which the incumbent President Kurmanbek Bakiyev was ousted by protesters and an interim government led by Roza Otunbayeva was formed. An election and reform plan was unveiled on 19 April 2010.

== Presidential terms ==
Under the new constitution, the presidential term is six years long, but re-election is barred.

== Date ==
The election date was announced on 22 April 2010; a constitutional referendum to reduce presidential powers and strengthen democracy was held on 27 June 2010.

On 19 May 2010, it was announced that the presidential elections would not be held on 10 October 2010 together with parliamentary elections, but rather in October 2011, and that Otunbayeva would remain president until 31 December 2011.

== Candidates ==
The Central Election Commission announced that eighty-three candidates filed to run in the election by the deadline of 16 August. 16 candidates were nominated by parties, while the rest self-nominated. The candidates would have to collect 30,000 signatures, pay a fee of 100,000 Kyrgyzstani soms and pass a televised language test to run for the office of president. Sixteen candidates then qualified to run in the election.

The candidates included:

- Prime Minister Almazbek Atambayev, party leader of the Social Democratic Party of Kyrgyzstan, who resigned his post in September to run for president. He is seen as the "flagbearer of reforms" that resulted in and from the new constitution.
- Former Emergency Situations Minister Kamchybek Tashiyev, party leader of Ata-Zhurt
- Former head of State Security Adakhan Madumarov
- Former Prosecutor-General Kubatbek Baibolov
- Sooronbay Dyikanov
- Former President of the Supreme Court Kurmanbek Osmonov
- Former Mayor of Bishkek Marat Sultanov

The incumbent Otunbayeva stated that she would not run in the election. Omurbek Tekebayev, party leader of the opposition Ata Meken Socialist Party, declared he would not be a candidate for the presidency on 22 September.

== Campaign ==
Atambayev had the most funds for his campaign and gained a significant share of exposure, thus he said the election could be over in one round. He added "I have bright hopes; it is time for our country to live, achieve harmony and flourish. People are tired of political battles and meetings." However Tashiyev and Madumarov on multiple occasions suggested that there could be vote-rigging during the election. Tashiyev said that: "The main thing is that there should be no evidence of fraud and the election results must not be falsified."

Following the ethnic riots in 2010, tensions between the indigenous Kyrgyz and Uzbeks continue to be volatile in the south with the region being viewed as a political battleground.

== Opinion polls ==
Opinion polls suggested Atambayev was the clear favourite, with Madumarov and Tashiyev, both from the south, being Atambayev's closest challengers.

== Conduct ==
The CEC announced on 21 July that it had accredited 40 television and radio broadcasting companies, as well as 103 print media outlets to cover the election, however it refused to consider doing so for 11 internet news agencies. The OSCE said that almost 400 international observers from 41 countries would monitor the election.

Douglas Wake, a monitor from the Office for Democratic Institutions and Human Rights, said that the election was competitive, but there were some issues in regards to the voter lists and the transparency of the process. Sooronbay Dyikanov said that he could not vote because his name was not on the voter list. The central election committee said that this was a mistake, and regional election commissions were the ones who were responsible for this. At the same time Dyikanov said that this was done deliberately. There were numerous other voters who could not vote for the same reason.

Adakhan Madumarov and five other candidates said they would reject the result as several people could not vote according to their "constitutional rights" and that there had been multiple voting.

== Results ==
Former Prime Minister Atambayev won the presidential election by a large margin in the first round and became the new President of Kyrgyzstan. Over 60% voter turnout was recorded.

Candidate	Party	Votes	%
Almazbek Atambayev	Social Democratic Party	1,161,929	63.83
Adakhan Madumarov	Butun Kyrgyzstan	274,639	15.09
Kamchybek Tashiev	Ata-Zhurt	266,189	14.62
Temirbek Asanbekov	Meken Yntymagy	17,232	0.95
Omurbek Suvanaliev	Independent	16,143	0.89
Kubatbek Baibolov	Independent	15,427	0.85
Tursunbai Bakir Uulu	Erkin Kyrgyzstan	15,195	0.83
Anarbek Kalmatov	Ar-Namys	13,609	0.75
Arstanbek Abdyldayev	El Uchun	8,770	0.48
Marat Imankulov	Independent	5,578	0.31
Kubanychbek Isabekov	Independent	3,239	0.18
Kurmanbek Osmonov	Independent	2,452	0.13
Akbaraly Aitikeev	Independent	2,081	0.11
Torobaev Kolubaev	Independent	1,941	0.11
Sooronbai Dyykanov	Independent	1,339	0.07
Almazbek Karimov	Independent	1,305	0.07
Against all		13,419	0.74
Total		1,820,487	100.00
Valid votes		1,820,487	97.95
Invalid/blank votes		38,145	2.05
Total votes		1,858,632	100.00
Registered voters/turnout		3,032,666	61.29
Source: CEC

== Reactions ==
After voting, Atambayev said that: "A parliamentary system is more suited to the nomadic spirit of the people." After 95% of the preliminary results suggested Atambayev had more than 60% of the vote, his campaign spokesman Kadyr Toktogulov said that "Atambayev secured a national victory. There is a very small split in the number of votes he got in the north and the south."
