= 2009 Kyrgyz presidential election =

- 23 July 2009
- Registered: 2,939,413
- Turnout: 79.20% (▲6.68pp)
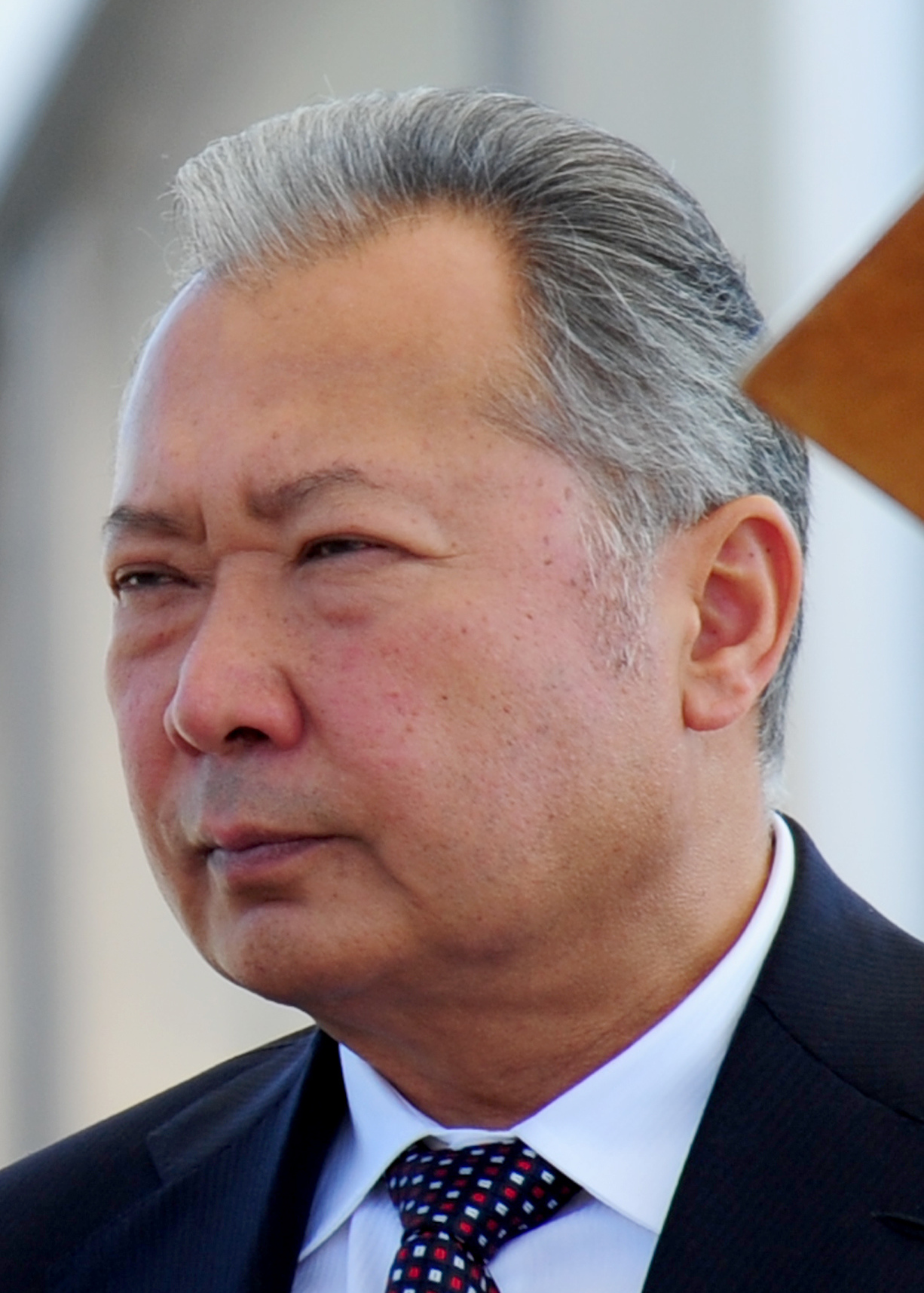

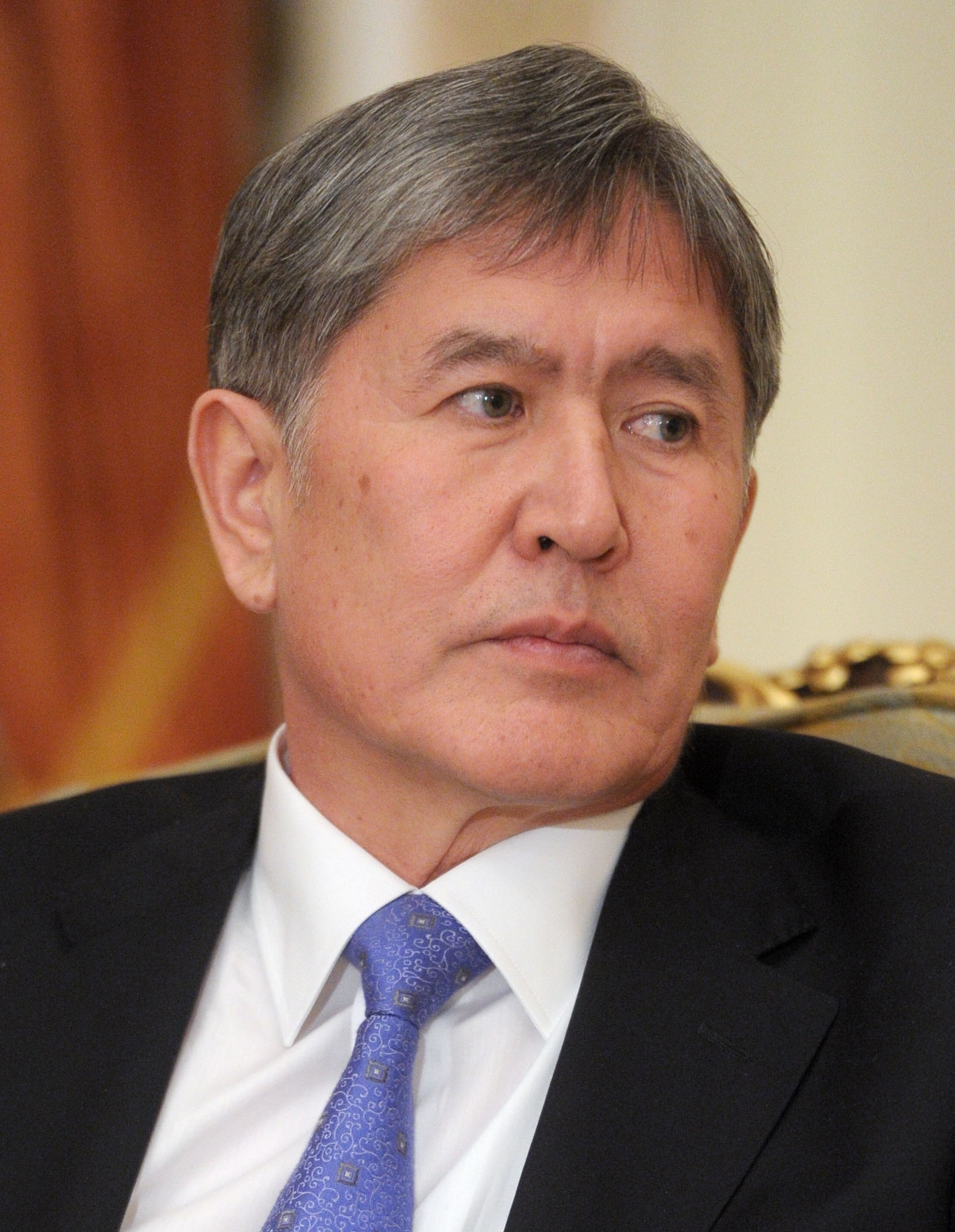

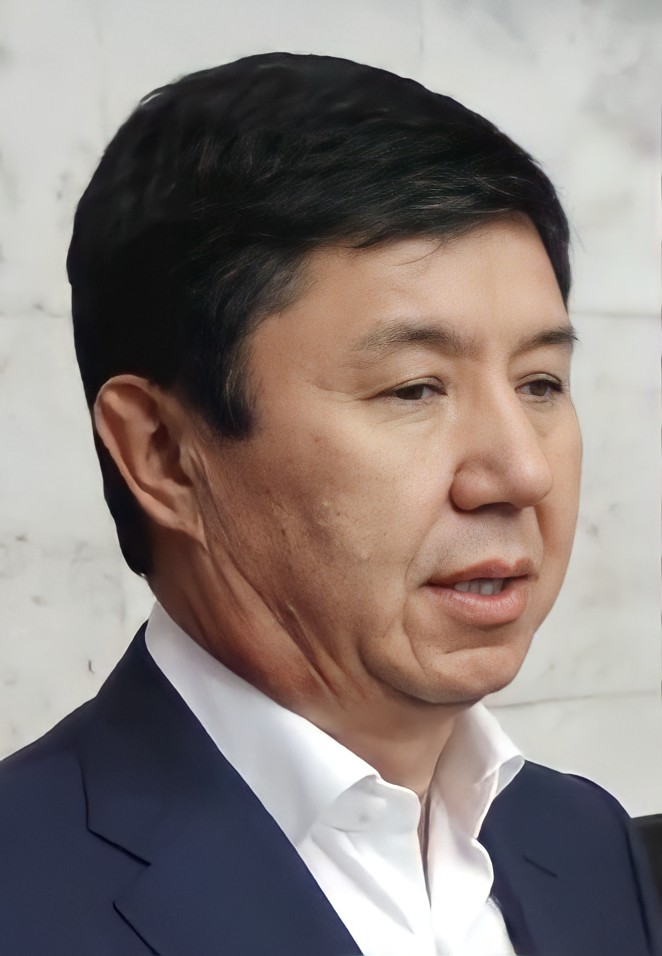
Nominee	Kurmanbek Bakiyev	Almazbek Atambayev	Temir Sariyev
Party	Ak Jol	SDPK	Akshumkar
Popular vote	1,779,417	195,291	149,658
Percentage	77.44%	8.50%	6.51%
President before election
Kurmanbek Bakiyev
Ak Jol
Elected President
Kurmanbek Bakiyev
Ak Jol

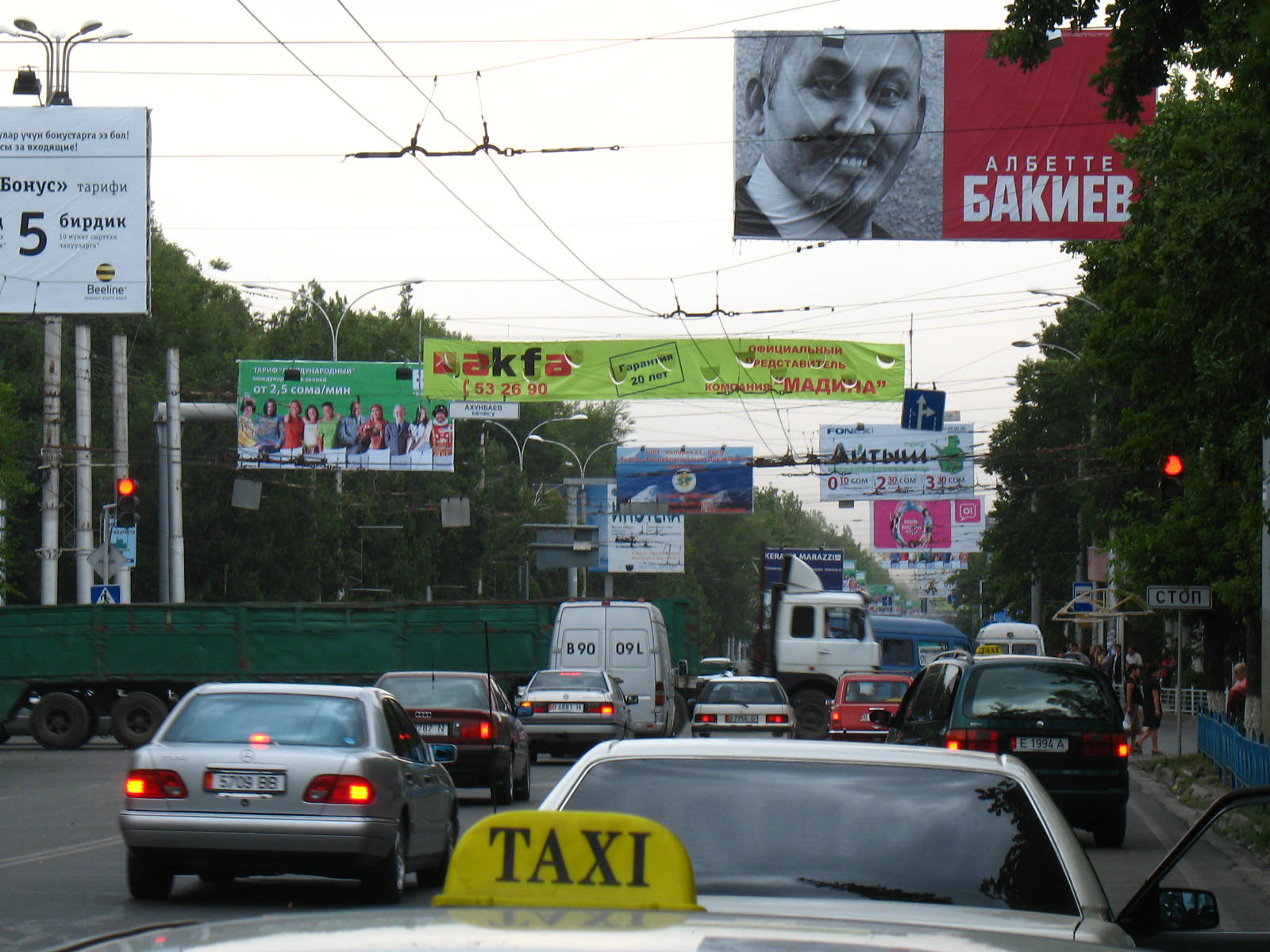
A billboard in Bishkek advertising Bakiyev for the election in Kyrgyzstan, reading "Bakiyev of course". The man depicted is supposed to represent a subset of his constituency.

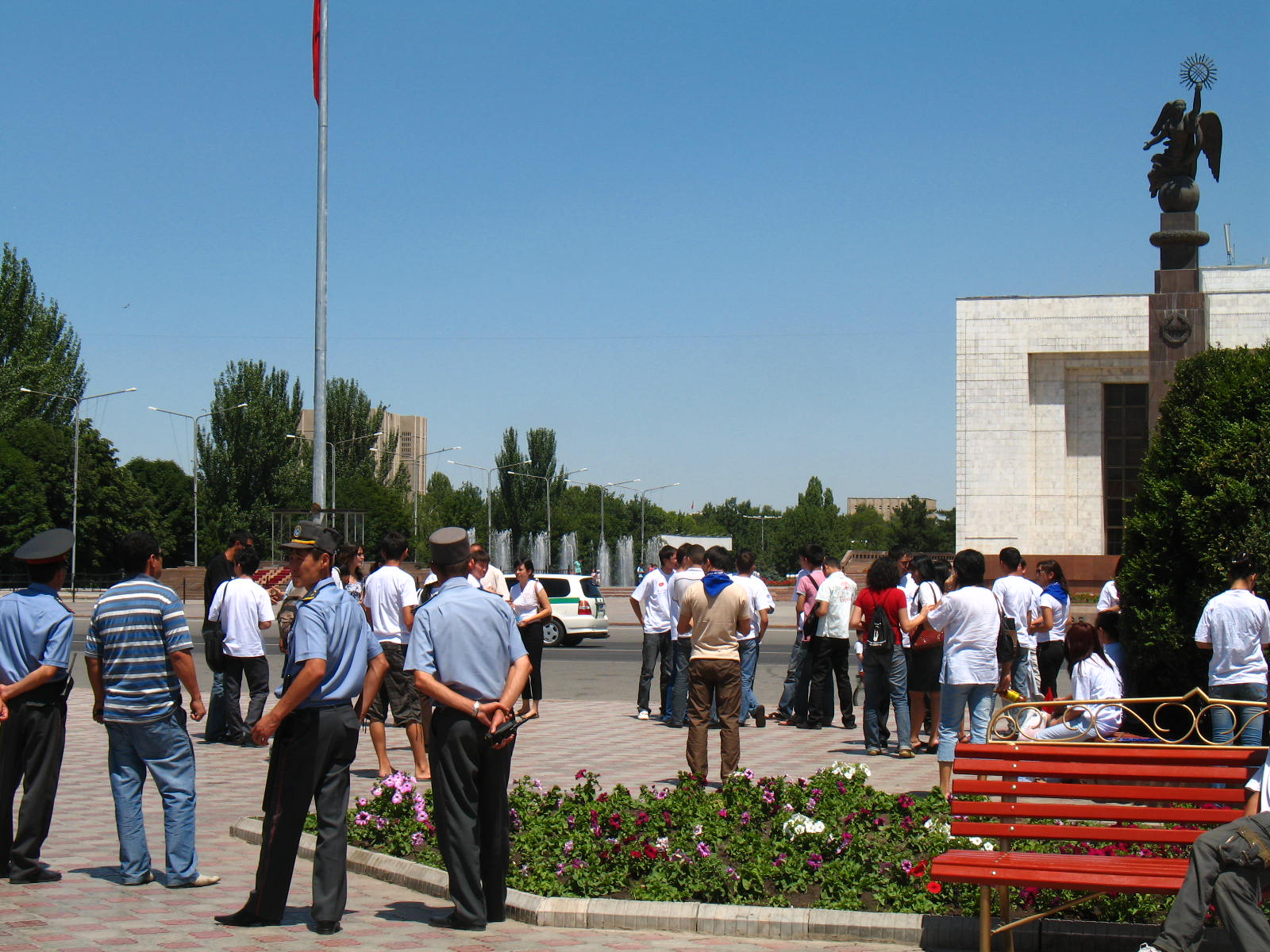
A student rally in Ala-Too Square in early July for Atambaev

Presidential elections were held in Kyrgyzstan on 23 July 2009. The date was set after the constitutional court ruled that the extension of the presidential term from four to five years did not apply until the next presidential election, calling for elections by 25 October 2009; in response, a parliament committee proposed the July election date, which was then passed by the incumbent president Kurmanbek Bakiyev's Ak Jol-dominated parliament. Bakiyev had previously announced his intention to run for reelection. Bakiyev was re-nominated on 1 May 2009.

On election day the main opposition candidate Almazbek Atambayev withdrew from the contest, citing his belief that fraud was employed extensively and thus considers the election illegitimate. The Organization for Security and Co-operation in Europe (OSCE) also claimed that Bakiyev had unfair advantages in terms of superior media coverage of his campaign, and vote rigging. Eventually, Bakiyev was declared the winner of the election with 76% of the vote. An opposition rally on election day was broken up by Kyrgyz police.

== Candidates ==
On 20 April 2009, the United Opposition announced its candidate – Almazbek Atambayev, the leader of the Social Democratic Party of Kyrgyzstan, the only opposition party represented in parliament. Another opposition politician, former defence minister Ismail Isakov, announced on 19 May 2009 that he would withdraw from the race to improve Atambayev's chances, reducing the field from 18 to 17 potential candidates.

Apart from Bakiyev and Atambayev, three more candidacies were approved: Those of Toktayym Ümötalieva (chairwoman of the Association of Nongovernmental and Nonprofit Organizations), physician Jengishbek Nazaraliev and Temir Sariyev.

Bakiyev's advertising campaign consisted primarily of television ads, billboards, and paper fliers in windows of stores, companies, and kiosks. Nazaraliev's advertising campaign consisted mainly of propaganda fliers and journals passed out to residences in Kyrgyzstan, as well as small paper advertisements stuck to walls and posts throughout Bishkek. Atambaev held rallies and also had paper advertisements posted. Motuev had at least one billboard, near ZUM.

== Election day ==
On polling day Atambayev withdrew his candidacy claiming widespread fraud; he stated: "Due to massive, unprecedented violations, we consider these elections illegitimate and a new election should be held." Independent candidate Jenishbek Nazaraliev also withdrew on election day. The OSCE stated that Bakiyev gained an "unfair advantage" and that the media bias "did not allow voters to make an informed choice." Additionally, they found that the election was "marred by many problems and irregularities", citing ballot stuffing and problems with the vote counting.

An opposition rally of 1,000 people in Balykchy during election day was broken up by riot police.

== Results ==
As of 22:00 on 26 July 2009 (with 2,282 of 2,330 polling districts reporting), Bakiev was reported had won the election with 78% of the vote. Earlier in the day (00:40 local time), the results showed the same number of districts reporting, but the numbers were significantly different, showing that Bakiyev had won with 82.62% of the vote.

The day after the election the opposition said it planned to hold more protests.

Candidate	Party	Votes	%
Kurmanbek Bakiyev	Ak Jol	1,779,417	77.44
Almaz Atambaev	Social Democratic Party	195,291	8.50
Temir Sariyev	Akshumkar	149,658	6.51
Toktayym Ümötalieva	Independent	25,096	1.09
Nurlan Motuev	Joomart	21,754	0.95
Jengishbek Nazaraliev	Independent	19,198	0.84
Against all		107,317	4.67
Total		2,297,731	100.00
Valid votes		2,297,731	98.70
Invalid/blank votes		30,338	1.30
Total votes		2,328,069	100.00
Registered voters/turnout		2,939,413	79.20
Source: OCSE, Ministry of Justice
