= United People's Movement =

The United People's Movement may refer to:

- United People's Movement (Antigua and Barbuda)
- United People's Movement (Cayman Islands)
- United People's Movement (Colombia)
- United People's Movement (Kyrgyzstan)
- United People's Movement (Namibia)
- United People's Movement (Saint Vincent and the Grenadines)
