= Osh Regional Committee of Communist Party of Kyrgyzstan =

The Osh Regional Committee of the Communist Party of Kirghizia, commonly referred to as the Osh CPK obkom, was the authority in the Osh region in the Kirghiz Soviet Socialist Republic. The position was created in 1939, and abolished on 25 August 1991. The First Secretary was considered the de facto governor of the Minsk region. The First Secretary was appointed by the Politburo.

== List of First Secretaries of the Regional Committee ==
Name	Term of Office	
Name	Start	End
Pyotr Kolosov	November 1939	1943
Djamankulov Toygombaev	1952	1955
Boris Yakovlev	1955	1958
Mederbek Abdykulov	1958	1960
Tiuregel'dy Baltagulov	1960	1962
Ahmatbek Suyumbaev	1962	1968
Sultan Ibraimov	1968	1978
Temirbek Koshoev	1978	1981
Vyacheslav Makarenko	1981	?
Renat Kulmatov	June 1981	1990
Usen Sydykov	1990	April 1991
Mirza Kaparov	April 1991	August 25, 1991

== See also ==
- Communist Party of the Soviet Union
- Communist Party of Kirghizia
- Osh Region
