= Democratic Movement of Kyrgyzstan =

Political party in Kyrgyzstan

Democratic Movement of Kyrgyzstan (Kyrgyz: Кыргызстан демократиялык кыймылы, Kyrgyzstan demokratialyk kyimyly; Russian: Демократическое движение Кыргызстана) is a political party active in Kyrgyzstan. The party was founded on 27 June 1993 with Jypar Jeksheev as Chairman until 2000, when he was succeeded by Edilbek Sarybaev.

In 2000, the movement joined with the supporters of the barred Ar-Namys Party of former Prime Minister Felix Kulov to form an electoral alliance to contest the parliamentary elections. The alliance collapsed when the Ar-Namys Party was registered.

In 2004, this movement joined the People's Movement of Kyrgyzstan electoral alliance.

== Historical background ==
Initially there was an opposition umbrella bloc, called the Kyrgyzstan Democratic Movement (Kyrgyzstan Demokratiyalyk Kyimyly, KDK). It was established on 25–26 May 1990 as a bloc of several anti-Communist political parties, movements and nongovernment organizations in Kyrgyzstan. The bloc elected five co-chairmen: Dr. Topchubek Turgunally (Turgunaliev), Kazat Akmatov (a Kyrgyz writer, then lawmaker), Jypar Jekshe (one of the leaders of the Ashar movement), Tolon Dyikanbaev and Kadyr Matkaziev (leader of the Asaba Party).

The draft of the program of the KDK was prepared by Dr. Kamilya Kenenbayeva (Women Pedagogy Institute in Bishkek, now the Pedagogy University named after Ishenally Arabayev), and the draft regulations of the movement was prepared by Dr. Tyntchtykbek Tchoroev (Kyrgyz State University, now the Kyrgyz National University). The movement consisted of democracy-minded intellectuals, workers, and students from ethnic groups (Kyrgyz, Russian, Ukrainian, German, Jew, Uzbek, Dungan, etc.)

The movement was dispersed into several political parties after the collapse of the Soviet Union and emergence of the independent Kyrgyz Republic. It took a few years (1991–1993) and one of its groups emerged as the Party of the Democratic Movement of Kyrgyzstan (June 1993).
