= Tursunbai Bakir Uulu =

Kyrgyzstani politician

Tursunbai Bakir Uulu (born March 17, 1958, in Kara-Suu, Osh Oblast) is a Kyrgyz politician, former ombudsman and presidential candidate. He is leader of the political party Erkin Kyrgyzstan (ErK). A teacher by training, a historian, and a doctor of philosophy he is married with four children.

== Biography ==
He graduated at the Kyrgyz National University's history faculty (1982). He also studied in Ukraine. In 1989–95, he was a member of the Association of the Young Historians of Kyrgyzstan. He worked at the Osh State University in the city of Osh in Southern Kyrgyzstan as a teacher (1990–1992).

He was first elected in 1995 as a member of the legislative assembly, after he helped set up the Erkin Kyrgyzstan Progressive Democratic Party political party. In 2000 he was given a fresh mandate, and two years later was elected Kyrgyzstan's first Ombudsman. He served in the position until February 2008.

Regularly vocal in his opposition to Askar Akayev, the Kyrgyz President ousted on 24 March 2005 during the Tulip Revolution, Bakir Uulu called for the abolishment of the death penalty, the release of Felix Kulov from prison, an end to the ban on the Islamic movement Hizb ut Tahrir, and called the 2005 legislative election the least free and fair the nation had ever seen.

Bakir Uulu ran in July 2005 presidential elections and lost to former president Kurmanbek Bakiev.

Since 2009 he is the Kyrgyz Ambassador to Malaysia.

He was elected to the Kyrgyz Parliament in October 2010 as a member of the Ar-Namys party, and was sworn in as a member of parliament on November 10, 2010.

== Electoral history ==
Electoral history of Tursunbai Bakir Uulu
Year	Office	Party	Votes received				Result
Year	Office	Party	Total	%	P.	Swing	Result
2000	President of Kyrgyzstan	Free Kyrgyzstan Party	18,774	0.98%	5th	—N/a	Lost
2005	President of Kyrgyzstan	Erkin Kyrgyzstan	78,701	3.97%	2nd	+2.99	Lost
2011	President of Kyrgyzstan	Erkin Kyrgyzstan	15,195	0.83%	7th	-3.14	Lost
