= 2005 Kyrgyz presidential election =

- 10 July 2005
- Registered: 2,760,530
- Turnout: 72.52% (▼5.88pp)
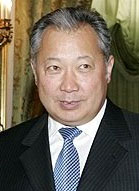
Nominee	Kurmanbek Bakiyev	Tursunbai Bakir Uulu
Party	Independent	ErK
Popular vote	1,776,156	78,701
Percentage	89.50%	3.97%
President before election
Kurmanbek Bakiev (acting)
Independent
Elected President
Kurmanbek Bakiev
Independent

Presidential elections were held in Kyrgyzstan on 10 July 2005. The result was a landslide victory for acting President Kurmanbek Bakiyev, marking the end of his interim government formed after the previous president, Askar Akayev, was overthrown in the revolution in March 2005.

== Post-revolution transition ==
On Thursday 24 March 2005, President Akayev fled the country as protesters overran government buildings. The Prime Minister Nikolai Tanayev also resigned within the same day creating a power vacuum. The constitution clearly states “If the President becomes unable to carry out their duties for reasons such as death, illness or impeachment, the Prime Minister shall carry out their duties until the election of a new head of state. This must take place within three months of the termination of their Presidency.” This therefore presented the Kyrgyz parliament with a legal problem. Ishenbai Kadyrbekov, the Speaker of Parliament immediately assumed power, unconstitutionally. The next day, opposition leader Kurmanbek Bakiyev was appointed prime minister and thus interim president.

The interim period was one of increasing political tension and a breakdown in the rule of law. The new unicameral parliament – elected amid allegations of fraud – went into session on 22 March. However, its mandate was revoked just two days later, with the Supreme Court declaring the old chamber the rightful body. This decision was then once more revoked by an agreement between the rival chambers. The “old” parliament dissolved itself, and the “new” parliament gained recognition as the legitimate body (although a number of individual seats remained in dispute and subject to review by courts). This drew some protests from people who argued that the uprising was in direct relation to the rigged election which had created the new legislature. Additionally Bermet Akayeva and other politicians were allowed to sit in the new chamber for a significant period, before also having their mandates declared null and void.

The former president, Akayev refused to resign until April, creating a legally questionable period whereby two heads of state existed (The parliament had allowed Bakiyev to take over without impeaching Akayev or initiating any legal process that formally ended his Presidency). The former leader's lawyers are still claiming that he legally remains President of Kyrgyzstan.

An upsurge in violence also occurred following the revolution. On 1 June hundreds of people forced their way into Kyrgyzstan's Supreme Court, ejecting protesters who had held it for more than a month. The occupation was being held in support of candidates who lost during the parliamentary elections in April. The sit-in had prevented the court from operating. After an hour of clashes, unarmed police and soldiers reportedly managed to separate the two groups, whilst one witness said they had seen several injured people taken away in ambulances.

Kyrgyz legislator Jyrgalbek Surabaldiev was shot dead in Bishkek on 10 June, following an attack on another politician Bayaman Erkinbayev in April. During the same day protesters, allegedly demonstrating against Erkinbayev, were fired on in the southern city of Osh. At least one person was killed, and five others were injured as a result of the violence.

== Candidates ==
The Central Election Commission completed registering presidential candidates on 13 June. Elections had last been held on October 29, 2000, with the next previously scheduled for late 2005. The 2000 election was marred by allegations of fraud, heightened by the high percentage of the vote for President Akayev - 74%. His nearest rival was Omurbek Tekebayev who polled 14%. Former Vice-President and opposition leader Felix Kulov had initially decided to run in the 2005 poll, but later withdrew from the race. This followed an agreement with acting President Bakyiev, whereby Kulov would become prime minister should the interim leader win the election. Urmatbek Baryktabasov, a businessman from eastern Karakol, was refused registration for the election, after authorities cited his alleged Kazakh citizenship. More than 100 Kyrgyz protesters demanding his registration subsequently stormed Bishkek's main government building, occupying it for several hours.

Six candidates were registered: acting President Kurmanbek Bakiyev; businessman Akbaraly Aitikeev; ombudsman Tursunbai Bakir uulu; former Interior Minister Keneshbek Duishebaev; Democratic Movement of Kyrgyzstan head Jypar Jeksheev; and Non-governmental organization activist Toktaim Umetalieva. Former Jalalabad Province Governor Jusupbek Sharipov, a seventh candidate, withdrew from the race on 23 June. He said that he wished to support Bakiev-Kulov, and work towards national unity.

The candidates met each other in a series of televised head-to-head debates from 4 July, culminating in a gathering of all individuals on Friday 8 July.

== Conduct ==
Over 80 international organisations requested accreditation for the election including: Organization for Security and Co-operation in Europe (369 observers), Commonwealth of Independent States Mission (261), National Democratic Institution (32), “Future without corruption” PU (24), Shanghai Cooperation Organisation, International Democratic Institution, embassies and other organisations. In total, 810 observers and 187 foreign correspondents intend to cover the ballot.

The OSCE declared the process as "tangible progress toward meeting OSCE and other international commitments" in its internet press release the following day. However, election monitors observed a "small number of serious irregularities," particularly during vote counting. Kimmo Kiljunen, head of the OSCE Parliamentary Assembly delegation, told a news conference in Bishkek on 11 July. Representatives of the CIS-EMO however stated "It is impossible to say that the presidential elections in Kyrgyzstan were fair and met the international standards in full". The group had previously said that the disputed 2005 Kyrgyz parliamentary elections were "free and fair".

Maksim Maksimovich, the lawyer of former president Akayev, claimed he could not vote in Moscow because his name had not been included on a voter list. His daughter, Bermet Akaeva however voted without incident in Bishkek. She claimed to have voted for the candidate who would not lead the country into catastrophe, according to RIA-Novosti news agency.

== Results ==
With Bakiev expected to easily win, the authorities feared a low turnout. However by 17:00 (Bishkek time) the Central Election Commission declared that around 53 percent of voters had participated. The law states that one vote over 50 percent is needed for the election to be deemed valid. The preliminary results of the ballot show that after 1,967 polling stations out of 2,181 (90.19%) returned results Bakiev has secured a landslide.

Candidate	Party	Votes	%
Kurmanbek Bakiyev	Independent	1,776,156	89.50
Tursunbai Bakir Uulu	Erkin Kyrgyzstan	78,701	3.97
Akbaraly Aitikeev	Independent	72,604	3.66
Zhapar Dzheksheyev	Independent	18,166	0.92
Toktayym Ümötalieva	Independent	10,445	0.53
Keneshbek Dushebaev	Independent	10,253	0.52
Against all		18,197	0.92
Total		1,984,522	100.00
Valid votes		1,984,522	99.13
Invalid/blank votes		17,482	0.87
Total votes		2,002,004	100.00
Registered voters/turnout		2,760,530	72.52
Source: Constitutional Court, IFES

== Aftermath ==
Bakiyev was sworn into office in Bishkek on 14 August.
