= Toktayum Umetalieva =

Kyrgyzstani physicist, political coordinator

- Токтайым Уметалиева

Personal details
- Born: 4 April 1962 (age 64) Leninpol, Kyrgyzstan
- Children: 3
- Occupation: Physicist, political coordinator, activist

Toktayum Umetalieva (Kyrgyz: Токтайым Уметалиева) (born 4 April 1962 in Leninpol) is a Kyrgyzstani physicist, political coordinator and activist. She was the only female candidate for the 2005 and 2009 Kyrgyz presidential elections.

== Biography ==
Born in the village of Leninpol in Talas District, she graduated from Kyrgyz State National University with a degree in physics in 1984. She worked a lecturer and became a director for an industrial and commercial company. In 1997, she was appointed chief editor of the newspaper Ай-Данек, and she has published several papers on science and politics. She has sat on numerous advisory councils in her native country for Supreme Council and has led the political party known as "Long Live Kyrgyzstan" ("Жашасын Кыргызстан").

She heads the Association of Nongovernmental and Noncommercial Organizations and was running as an independent.

Umetalieva been employed as a national coordinator for UNICEF and is associated with the World Bank. Between 2000 and 2010 she was the chair of Kyrgyzstan's Association of Nongovernmental and Noncommercial Organizations. She stood as a presidential candidate for the 2009 elections to raise awareness of women's rights issues. In 2011 she advocated the dismantling of the statue of Erkindik on Ala-Too Square in Bishkek.

She is married and has three daughters: Mirgul, Nazgul, and Burulayim.
