= Tyntchtykbek Tchoroev =

Kyrgyzstani writer and historian (born 1959)

Tynchtykbek Chorotegin
- Lang Ying and T. Chorotegin in Beijing, 19 October 2015
- Born: 28 March 1959 (age 67); On-Archa, Naryn District, Kyrgyz SSR, USSR
- Other name: Tyntchtykbek Tchoroev
- Awards: The Order of Manas III degree (2016); The Glory (Dank) Medal of Kyrgyzstan (2011)

Academic background
- Education: Kyrgyz National University, Bishkek; Oriental Institute of Uzbekistan's Academy of Sciences, Tashkent
- Doctoral advisor: Bori Akhmedov

Academic work
- Discipline: History, Oriental studies, Turkic studies, journalism
- Institutions: Kyrgyz National University, (in 1980-2006 with intervals)

Tynchtykbek Chorotegin (Kyrgyz: Тынчтыкбек Чоротегин [tʰɯɲtɕtʰɯ̥χˈpec tɕʰɔɾɔtʰeˈʝiɲ]), also previously known as Tynchtykbek Kadyrmambetovich Tchoroev (Russian: Тынчтыкбек Кадырмамбетович Чороев), is a Kyrgyz historian, publicist and journalist. He has served as President of the Kyrgyz History Society since his election on 11 February 2012, and holds the degrees of Doctor of History (1998) and the title of Professor at Kyrgyz State National University, named after Jusup Balasagyn (2002). Chorotegin is widely recognised as an independent researcher, Turkologist and journalist. Until September 2011, he worked as a broadcaster at Radio Azattyk, the Kyrgyz Service of Radio Free Europe/Radio Liberty, and served as Director of the Kyrgyz Service from 1 January 2003 to 30 September 2010. Between 30 August 2013 and 4 May 2017, he was chairman of the Board of the Muras (Heritage) Foundation, attached to the Office of the President of the Kyrgyz Republic.

== Early life and education ==
Chorotegin was born on 28 March 1959 in the village of Echki‑Bashy, in the On‑Archa rural district of Naryn province, northern Kyrgyzstan. His grandfather, Choro‑Hajji (né Aity uulu), was a prosperous figure who undertook the pilgrimage to Mecca well before the 1916 anti‑Tsarist uprising of the Kyrgyz. Choro‑Hajji died in 1927, shortly before the Stalinist regime launched its campaign of expropriation against wealthy Kyrgyz in the closing years of the 1920s. His mausoleum, built between 1927 and 1928, still stands near the village of Echki‑Bashy. A grandson of Choro‑Hajji through his elder son, Bekbolot, perished in the Stalinist purges on account of the family’s wealthy background.

Choro‑Hajji’s wife, Suyumkan Malay kyzy, was the daughter of a prosperous man from the neighbouring village of Ming‑Bulak. She had received some education before the Soviet period and was able to read the Quran in Arabic. Her elder son, Kadyrmambet Choroev, married his cousin Aliya Kydyraaly kyzy, whose mother, Seidana Malay kyzy, was likewise a literate woman, able to read the Quran and write in Arabic script. The Arabic script was officially suppressed in Kyrgyzstan between 1928 and 1929, when the Soviet Kyrgyz were transferred to the Latin alphabet (which remained in use until 1939–40), and in consequence both of Chorotegin’s grandmothers were officially classed as “uneducated”.

Kadyrmambet and Aliya had five sons and three daughters; Chorotegin was their fourth child. In his earliest years he was raised by both of his grandmothers, Suyumkan and Seidana. Until the autumn of 1966, he would accompany the family to the summer pasture of Solton‑Sary. He was taught the alphabet at home by his older brothers and sister before ever attending school.

In September 1966, Chorotegin entered the village school at Echki‑Bashy. After completing the eighth grade there, he moved to Naryn to continue his studies at the No. 1 Toktogul Satylgan‑uulu Secondary School, from which he graduated with a silver medal in 1976. He then enrolled in the history faculty of the Kyrgyz State University (now the Kyrgyz National University, named after Jusup Balasagyn). While a student in the capital, then called Frunze (present‑day Bishkek), he took an active part in the university’s academic and literary circles. He completed his degree at the university with a so‑called “red diploma” in 1981.

He then studied at the Oriental Institute named after Abu Reihan Beruni of the Uzbekistan Academy of Sciences in Tashkent from 1983 to 1988, where he defended his first doctoral thesis on the migrations of Eastern Turkic groups in the 9th–13th centuries according to medieval Muslim sources (in Russian language; Tashkent, December 1988).

He led the Chair of Ancient and Medieval History (1989–1991) and the Chair of Asian and African States History (1992–1994) at the Kyrgyz National University. He subsequently studied for his doctorate at the same university (1994–1997) and defended his doctoral thesis on the life and era of Mahmud al-Kashghari (al-Barsqani), an Eastern Turkic scholar of the 11th century, and his scholarly legacy. The thesis was defended at the Kyrgyzstan National Academy of Sciences on 10 April 1998 (in Kyrgyz language). A monograph on the subject was published by the Muras Foundation in September 2017.

His name and surname was officially changed in Kyrgyzstan to Tynchtykbek Chorotegin since 9 June 2026 (it was just his pen name before).

== Textbooks and Turkology publications ==
Chorotegin has published several monographs and books in Kyrgyz and Russian languages (since 1990) and several textbooks devoted to the ancient and medieval history of the Kyrgyz people and their neighbors in Central and Inner Asia.

The first post-Soviet Kyrgyz textbooks for the secondary schools in Kyrgyzstan by him in co-authorship with Professor Toktorbek Omurbekov have been translated from Kyrgyz into Russian and Uzbek languages.

The textbooks for secondary schools have been officially distributed by the Education Ministry in Kyrgyzstan since 1996.

Some of his articles on Kyrgyz history and medieval sources were published by UNESCO, International Journal of Middle East Studies, Kyrgyz National Encyclopedia, Soviet Encyclopedia, etc. (in Kyrgyzstan, the United States, Western Europe, Russia, Turkey, China, Uzbekistan).

== Public activities ==
In his youth, Chorotegin was a member of the Kyrgyzstan Komsomol, as was common for young people in the Soviet Union at the time.

At the time, he was unaware that his father's elder brother had been a victim of the Stalinist purge and had died in a Gulag camp somewhere in Soviet Russia. His worldview gradually shifted between 1980 and 1988, a period that encompassed the Perestroika era. In 1987–1988, he was among the Kyrgyz intellectuals who campaigned for the Kyrgyz language to be granted equal status alongside Russian as an official language of the republic. In 1989, he became one of the young Kyrgyz intellectuals who advocated for the national identity of the Kyrgyz people.p He was a founding member and one of the leaders of the Kyrgyzstan's Young Historians Association, the first nongovernmental organization of the Kyrgyz historians to challenge the official Soviet Kyrgyz historiography. The Kyrgyz Soviet parliament adopted the State Language Law on 23 September 1989, which permitted Kyrgyz citizens to adopt the surname suffix '-tegin' in place of the Russian suffixes '-ov' or '-ev'. Shortly after the law was implemented, Tchoroev began using the name "Chorotegin". Thus, most of his post-Soviet works were published under the surname Chorotegin.

He served first as deputy chairman and later as chairman of the Kyrgyzstan Young Historians Association, which had been established on 3 June 1989 despite opposition from the Communist leadership in Kyrgyzstan. It was the first nongovernmental organization to hold its founding conference in the Kyrgyz language with a simultaneous Russian translation. The Kyrgyzstan Writers Union, led by the writer and statesman Chingiz Aitmatov, supported the young Kyrgyz historians by providing the Union's hall for their conference at no cost.

He was the co-author of the new program of the Kyrgyz history for the secondary schools published in September 1989 in both Kyrgyz and Russian languages in the Mugalimder Gazetasy (The Teachers' Newspaper), the official media outlet of the Kyrgyz Education Ministry, where the previous Kyrgyz historiography views were challenged by the new ideas.

He was elected as a member of the Board of the Kyrgyz Republic's Public Radio and TV Broadcasting Company (KTRK) by the Kyrgyzstan Parliament on 18 April 2012 and served until the end of the term (April 2017).

He became a member of the official commission for the development of historical science under the Kyrgyz President, established by a decree signed by President Almazbek Atambayev on 25 April 2012.

== Political activities ==
In 1990 January and February, Tchoroev (Chorotegin) participated at the protest rally of the democracy-oriented Kyrgyz youth in Bishkek. Then he was one of the main organizers of the round tables with participation of the young Kyrgyz scholars, students and young workers and the Kyrgyz Soviet officials (February – April 1990).

In April, Tchoroev (Chorotegin) became a member of the underground political party of Asaba (Flag), and participated at the first ever anti-Communist rally organized by the party on 1 May 1990 in Bishkek. The columns of the rally participants followed by the officially allowed Communist-run columns through the Central Ala-Too square in Bishkek.

The difference of the Asaba Party's column was in their slogans written on the blue placards demanding to build democracy and to stop the one-party-ruling system in Soviet Kyrgyzstan.

Tchoroev (Chorotegin) was one of the organizers of the Democratic Movement of Kyrgyzstan (Kyrgyzstan Demokratialyk Kyimyly, KDK), the first umbrella bloc for several opposition parties, movements and nongovernmental organizations in Kyrgyzstan (1990 - 1993). (See: Democratic Movement of Kyrgyzstan.)

The founding Congress of the KDK was held in Bishkek on 25–26 May 1990. At the Congress, he presented a report on the Regulations of the KDK (he was the author of the draft of the Regulations. The core ideas of the KDK's Regulations were based upon similar documents of the anti-Communist democratic movements of the Baltic states).

In October 1990, he participated at the international conference of the anti-Communist organizations from several Soviet republics, including some separatist republics, in Kiev. He witnessed the anti-Communist hunger strike of the Ukrainian students there.

In 19–27 October 1990, Tchoroev (Chorotegin) also was amongst organizers and active participants of the similar hunger strike action in Frunze (nowadays Bishkek), the capital city of Kyrgyzstan, organized by the KDK.

The protest action with demands to democratize then the Soviet Central Asian republic, ended with the victory of the democracy-oriented politicians: Askar Akayev, a Kyrgyz academician who started to criticize the ruling Communist regime, was elected by the parliament as the first ever Kyrgyzstan President.

In 1992, he was one of the co-authors of the alternate draft of the post-Soviet Kyrgyzstan Constitution (published in both Kyrgyz and Russian). He was a member of the Free Kyrgyzstan (Erkin Kyrgyzstan) Democratic Party at that time.

At the beginning of 1993, Tchoroev (Chorotegin) ceased all the political activities (including the party membership) due to his journalism duties and scholarly career.

== Journalism, literature, and reporting ==
His first political pamphlet was published by the monthly satirical magazine Chalkan (Stinging-Nettle) in October 1974, when he was still a schoolboy. It was written under the influence of the Soviet propaganda apparatus regarding the Western world.

Chorotegin published numerous humorous short stories in Kyrgyz in various newspapers, magazines, almanacs and a small book (1974–1986).

He published numerous reports and journalistic articles on the cultural and social life of Kyrgyzstanis and peoples of Central Asia and China, in both Kyrgyz and Russian.

He edited several books in Kyrgyz and Russian, including monographs by the Kyrgyz orientalist Omurkul Kara uulu (Karaev), the Russian archeology professor Yuliy Khudiakov, the Kyrgyz historians Arslan Koichiev, Akylbek Kylychev, and Oljobay Karatayev, the lawyer Sabyrbek Kojonaliev, and several English–Kyrgyz dictionaries for children.

In April 1991, Chorotegin became the second freelancer to work for the Kyrgyz Service of Radio Free Europe/Radio Liberty from within the country.

He was the first chief of the Bishkek Bureau of Radio Azattyk (the Kyrgyz Service of Radio Free Europe/Radio Liberty) from 1992 to 1995 and again from 1996 to 1998.

Chorotegin worked as a producer for the BBC Kyrgyz Service (based in London) from April 1998 to July 2000.

He became a broadcaster for Radio Azattyk (the Kyrgyz Service of Radio Free Europe/Radio Liberty, based in Prague) on 25 July 2000. He served as director of the service from 1 January 2003 to 30 September 2010.

On 16 August 2011, he ceased his broadcaster's position at the Prague headquarters of Radio Azattyk.

He is one of the active members of the Kyrgyz-language Wikipedia movement (since 2009).

He served as chairman of the Board of the Muras (Heritage) Foundation under the Office of the President of the Kyrgyz Republic from August 2013 to May 2017.

=== Translations of works from foreign languages into Kyrgyz ===
He translated several books from English and Russian into Kyrgyz.

One of them, entitled The Fatal Conceit: The Errors of Socialism, 1988, by Friedrich August von Hayek, was translated by Chorotegin alone and published in Kyrgyz in Bishkek in 1998 (ISBN 9967-11-025-2).

Another monograph, entitled The Rise of the West: A History of the Human Community: With a Retrospective Essay, 1991, by William Hardy McNeill (its ancient and early medieval sections), was translated in collaboration with Dr. Arslan Koichiev and Dr. Taalaibek Abdiev. It was published in Kyrgyz in Bishkek in 2002 (ISBN 9967-11-133-X). Both translations were published by the Soros-Kyrgyzstan Foundation.

He was also among three Kyrgyz translators of Deng Xiaoping During the Cultural Revolution by Maomao (Deng Rong). It was translated from Russian into Kyrgyz and published by the Roza Otunbayeva Initiatives International Public Foundation (Bishkek, 2015. – 592 pages, ill. – Personalities with the Exemplary Life Series. – ISBN 978-9967-27-745-8). The other translators were Esenbai Nurushev and Abibilla Pazylov.

In November 2015, he completed his translation of An Autobiography or The Story of My Experiments with Truth by Mahatma Gandhi (from English into Kyrgyz). The "Roza Otunbayeva Initiative" International Public Foundation published the book in Kyrgyzstan as part of the Personalities with the Exemplary Life Series.

He translated Profiles in Courage by John Fitzgerald Kennedy from English into Kyrgyz. It was published by the Arcus Publishing House in Bishkek in early 2020 as part of the "Roza Otunbayeva Initiative" International Public Foundation's translation projects, with sponsorship from the U.S. Embassy in Bishkek.

He also translated the 6th and 10th volumes of "The Governance of China" series from English into Kyrgyz in 2020; both were published by the Arcus Publishing House in Bishkek at the end of 2020.

== Family ==
He married Nurgul Dykanalieva (1957-2012), a Kyrgyzstan citizen, on 15 May 1982.

She had graduated the bibliography and librarian branch of the philology faculty at the Kyrgyz women pedagogy university (now - the Kyrgyz State Pedagogy University named after Eshenally Arabay uulu.) A native speaker of Kirghiz, she was also fluent in Kazakh, Russian, English, and Czech. She died in the Bishkek city hospital due to massive stroke on 17 September 2012.

He then married Dr. Aishat Botobekova (now Tchoroeva), a philologist and expert on Kyrgyz people's sign and gesture systems, in Bishkek on 9 November 2013.

He has a son and four daughters.

In accordance with new legislation in Kyrgyzstan and his own volition, his name and surname were changed to Tynchtykbek Kadyrmambet-uulu Chorotegin, effective June 9, 2026. He announced this on his Facebook page on June 12, 2026.

== Awards ==
- The Order of "Manas" III degree (31 December 2016).
- Laureate of the Tashkent Region's Komsomol (in the field of science; for the cycles of scholarly articles on Makhmud Kashghari); 1989 (Uzbekistan).
- Laureate of the Kyrgyzstan Youth Union (in the field of science; for the monograph on Makhmud Kashghari); 1992 (Kyrgyzstan).
- Academician of the International Aitmatov Academy. 1994 (Kyrgyzstan).
- Prize-winner of the Kyrgyzstan Historians' Society; 1995 (Kyrgyzstan).
- The Dank (Glory) medal (2011) (Kyrgyzstan).
- Diploma of the State Language Commission under the Kyrgyz President (2012) (Kyrgyzstan).
- The International Organization of Turkic Culture (TurkSOY) Media awards (2013) (Ankara, Turkey).
- KTRK's Jubilee medal devoted to the 55th anniversary of the Kyrgyzstan TV Broadcasting (2013) (Kyrgyzstan).
- Certificate of Honour of the International Turkic Academy (Astana, Kazakhstan, August 2015).
- Awards by the Valeh Hacilar International Scientific and Cultural Foundation for the 2014 Year (2015) (Erzurum, Turkey).
- The Honorary Citizen of the Naryn region (2015) (Kyrgyzstan).
- The Honorary Citizen of the city of Naryn (2015) (Kyrgyzstan).
- The Jubilee medal devoted to the 25th anniversary of the Kyrgyzstan Democratic Movement (2015) (Kyrgyzstan).
- Honorary Professor of 3 universities in Kyrgyzstan (the Kyrgyz State University named after Ishenally Arabayev, Naryn State University named after Satybaldy Naamatov and Talas State University) (2019).

== Selected bibliography ==
As a sole author

1. Çorotegin, Tınçtıkbek. Mahmud Kaşgari Barskaninin «Divanu lugati t-türk» emgegi türk elderinin tarihi boyunça köönörgüs bulak: İlimiy basılış / Redkollegiya: K.S.Moldokasımov (töraga), j.b.; ilimiy redaktorlor T.Ömürbekov, K.Moldokasımov. – Bişkek: "Turar" basması, 2017. - 376 b., süröt, karta. – "Muras" fondu. ["Tarıh jana muras" türmögü]. - "Kırgız Tarıh Koomu" el aralık koomduk birikmesi. - ISBN 978-9967-15-701-9. (Chorotegin (Tchoroev), Tynchtykbek. Divanu Lugati t-Türk, the work by Mahmud Kashgari Baskani, as an Inexhaustible Source on the History of the Turkic Peoples / Editorial Board: K.Moldokasymov (Chairman), etc. Edited by Toktorbek Omurbekov and Kyias Moldokasymov. – Bishkek: Turar Printing House, 2017. – 376 pages, ill., map. – The Muras Foundation. – The History and Heritage Series. – The Kyrgyz History Society international public association. – ISBN 978-9967-15-701-9. - In Kyrgyz language.)
2. Historiography of Post-Soviet Kyrgyzstan, in: International Journal for Middle East Studies, 2002, Vol. 34, pp. 351–374 (USA); (2002 Cambridge Un-ty Press 0020-7438/02 )
3. The Kyrgyz Republic, in: The Turks (English language edition) / Edited by Hasan Celal Güzel, C. Cem Oguz, and Osman Karatay. – Ankara: Yeni Turkiye Research & Publishing Center, 2002. – 6 volumes. – ISBN 975-6782-55-2. (Volume 6: Turkish World. pp. 201–213.)
4. Etnicheskiye situatsii v tyurkskikh regionakh Tsentral'noi Azii domongol'skogo vremeni: Po musul'manskim istochnikam IX-XIII vv., edited by Professor Bori Ahmedov. - Bishkek, 1995. – 208 p., ill., map. (in Russian);
5. Makhmud Kashghari (Barskani) jana anyn "Divanu lughati t-turk" söz jyinaghy: (1072–1077), edited by Omurkul Kara-uulu. Bishkek, 1997. – 160 p., ill., map. (in Kyrgyz); (ISBN 5-655-01222-7)
6. 'The Kyrgyz'; in: The History of Civilisations of Central Asia, Vol. 5, Development in contrast: from the sixteenth to the mid-nineteenth century /Editors: Ch. Adle and Irfan Habib. Co-editor: Karl M. Baipakov. – UNESCO Publishing. Multiple History Series. Paris. 2003. Chapter 4, pp. 109–125. (ISBN 92-3-103876-1)
7. Çorotegin, Tınçtıkbek. Atlah salgılaşuusunun tarıhıy ordu: din jaatındagı ayrım aşıkça baa berüülörgö sın köz karaş [The Historical Place of the Battle of Atlah: A Critical Look at Some Overestimations Regarding the Religion], in: Talas Savaşı ve Tarihi Önemi / Editörler Fahri Solak, Mairam Baigonusheva, Tynchtykbek Chorotegin, Moimol Cusupova. İstanbul, 2022. 406 s. Türk Dünyası Belediyeler Birliği (TDBB) Yayınları No: 34. (in Kyrgyz).
8. Ocherki istorii kyrgyzov i Kyrgyzstana: (From Ancient Times Until the End of the 18th Century), in: Kyrgyzy: 14-ti tomnik. 11-i tom. Istochniki, istoriya, etnografiya, kul'tura, fol'klor / Sostaviteli Kengesh Jusupov, Kanybek Imanaliev; redaktory Temir Asanovm Ryskul Joldoshov. - Bishkek: Biyiktik Publishing House, 2011. - pp. 157–195. – ISBN 978-9967-13-792-9. (In Russian.)
9. Kratkiy kurs po izucheniyu arabskoi grafiki sovremennykh kyrgyzov KNR: Uchebnoie posobiye dlya studentov-istorikov / Otv. red. Prof. T.N.Omurbekov. - Bishkek: Kyrgyznatsuniversitet, 2002. - 22 p. – ISBN 9967-403-49-7. (In Russian.)
10. Chorotegin T. A New Book On Törökul Aitmatov, His Life Journey And His Era: Tarïxtïn Aktay Baraktarï [The Blank Pages Of History]: By Roza Törökulovna Aitmatova. Edited By T. Shaydullaeva And N. Jeenalieva. - Bishkek: Uchkun, 2013. 216 Pages. (In Kyrgyz). Journal of Central and Inner Asian Dialogue. Volume 2, Issue No. 1, Winter 2015. ISSN 2330-6610. pp. 78–82.
11. The Early Stages of Kyrgyz Ethnicity and Statehood (201 BCE – 10th Century CE); in: International Journal of Eurasian Studies. – Beijing, 2019. – Vol. 9. Special Issue on the Study of Kirghiz History and Culture / Editors-in-Chief Yu Taishan and Li Jinxiu. p. 33–60.
12. Chorotegin (Tchoroev), Tyntchtykbek. Migration Processes in Central Asia From the Middle of the Eighth to Early Tenth Century and Their Consequences // Heritage and Identity in the Turkic World: Contemporary Scholarship in Memory of Ilse Laude-Cirtautas (1926–2019) / Edited by: Alva Robinson, Kağan Arık, Elmira Köchümkulova and Jonathan North Washington. – Berlin: De Gruyter, 2023. – pp. 45–62. – Volume 33 in the series Studien zur Sprache, Geschichte und Kultur der Turkvölker. – doi:10.1515/9783110720228. – eBook Published: October 24, 2023. ISBN 978-3-11-072022-8. Hardcover Published: October 24, 2023. ISBN 978-3-11-071992-5.
13. Chorotegin, Tynchtykbek. On the Place, Time and A Source of the Method of Writing the Work "Divanu Lugati t-Turk" by Mahmud Kashgari Barsqani (the 11th century) [O meste, vremeni i metode napisaniya truda «Divan lugat at-turk» Makhmuda Kashgari Barskani]. In: Turkic Studies Journal. Astana, 2026, Volume 8, Special Issue, Number 2. – Pp. 242–269. DOI: https://doi.org/10.32523/2664-5157-2026-2SI-242-269
14. Tchoroev (Chorotegin), Tynchtykbek. Kyrgyzstan as the Centre of the Nomad World: Tourism and the World Nomad Games, In: Journal of Intercultural Dialogue. Ulaanbaatar: International Institute for the Study of Nomadic Civilizations under the auspices of UNESCO, 2024. – Vol. II. – Pp. 92–106. ISSN 3005-3579. URL: www.unesco-iisnc.com

Books published in collaboration

1. with B.Urstanbekov: Kyrgyz tarykhy: Kyskacha entsiklopediyalyk sözdük, Frunze, Kyrgyz Sovet Entsiklopediyasynyn Bashky redaktsiyasy, 1990. – 288 pages. (in Kyrgyz); (ISBN 5-89750-028-2)
2. with T.Omurbekov: "Tündük Kyrgyzstandyn Orusiiaga karatylyshy (1855–1868)", Bishkek, 1992 (in Kyrgyz);
3. with T.Omurbekov: Kyrgyzdardyn jana Kyrgyzstandyn tarykhy: Ezelki zamandan VII k. bashyna cheyin: 6-klass, Bishkek, 1997 (in Kyrgyz); (re-published in new version in 2002. Bishkek.)
4. with T.Omurbekov: Kyrgyzdardyn jana Kyrgyzstandyn tarykhy: VII k. bashy - XVIII k. ayaghy: 7-klass, Bishkek, 1998 (in Kyrgyz); (re-published in new version in 2002. – Edited by Oskon Osmonov. Bishkek. 2002. – 202 pages, ill., map. ISBN 5-655-01416-5)
5. with T.Omurbekov: Kyrgyzdardyn jana Kyrgyzstandyn tarykhy: (XIX k. bashy - 1917-jyl): 8-klass, Bishkek, 1998 (in Kyrgyz); (re-published in new version in 2003. – Bishkek.)
6. with Omurbekov Toktorbek, Marchenko Larisa. Istoriya Kyrgyzstana: (S drevneishih vremion do nachala IX v. n. e.): Nachal’niy kurs. 6-y klass. / Spets. Redactor Murat Imankulov. Translated from Kyrgyz into Russian by J.Judemisheva and J.Alymkulov. – Bishkek: Pedagogika Printing House. 2001. – 152 pages, ill. Map. (ISBN 9967-415-41-X)
7. with Omurbekov Toktorbek. Istoriya Kyrgyzstana: (IX – XVIII vv. ). 7-y klass. / Spets. Redactor Oskon Osmonov. Translated from Kyrgyz into Russian by J.Judemisheva. – Bishkek: Izdatel'skiy tsentr Ministerstva obrazovaniya I kul’tury "Tekhnologiya". 2003. – 184 pages, ill., map. (ISBN 5-85580-007-5)
8. with Omurbekov Toktorbek. Istoriya Kyrgyzstana: (XIX v. – 1917 g.). 8-y klass. / Spets. Redactor Oskon Osmonov. Translated from Kyrgyz into Russian by M. Nurtumova. – Bishkek: Izdatel'skiy tsentr Ministerstva obrazovaniya I kul’tury "Tekhnologiya". 2003. – 192 pages, ill. (ISBN 5-85580-007-5)
9. with T.Omurbekov: Kyrgyzdardyn jana Kyrgyzstandyn tarykhy: XVII - XX k. bashy, Bishkek, 1995 (in Kyrgyz);
10. with K.Moldokasymov: Kyrgyzdardyn jana Kyrgyzstandyn kyskacha taryhy, Bishkek, 2000 (in Kyrgyz);
11. with K.Moldokasymov: Istoriya Kyrgyzstana; in: Kyrgyzstan: Entsiklopediya, Bishkek, 2001 (in the separate Kyrgyz and Russian editions);
12. with U.A.Asanov, A.Z.Jumanazarova: Kto est' kto v kyrgyzskoi nauke: Bio-bibliograficheskiy spravochnik, Bishkek, 1997 (in Russian);
13. with U.A.Asanov, A.Z.Jumanazarova: Kyrgyzskaia nauka v litsah: Kratkiy istoricheskiy I bio- bibliograficheskiy svod / Otv. Red. U.A.Asanov. – Bishkek: Tsentr gosyazyka I entsiklopedii. 2002. – 544 pages, ill., map. (ISBN 5-89750-142-4)
14. with T.Turgunally, K.Asanaliev, M.Kerimbaev: Kyrgyz Jumuriyatynyn Konstitutsiyasynyn dolbooru: Al'ternativdik dolboor. Proyekt Konstitutsii Respubliki Kyrgyzstan: Al'ternativnyi proekt, Bishkek, 1992 ( An Alternative Draft of the Kyrgyz Republic's Constitution; in Kyrgyz and Russian); etc.

== Sources ==
- The Academicians of the Aitmatov Academy / by Dildebek Andashev; edited by Dr. Chetin Jumagulov. - Bishkek: Editorial Board of the Kyrgyz Encyclopaedia, 2011. - p. 96. - In Kyrgyz. - Aitmatov akademiyasynyn akademikteri / Jyinakty tu'zgo'n Dildebek Andashev; jooptuu redaktor Chetin Jumagulov. - Bishkek: Kyrgyz entsiklopediyasynyn bashky redaktsiyasy. - 104 pages, ill. - ISBN 978-9967-14-087-5.
- The Kyrgyz History: An Encyclopaedia / edited by Abylabek Asankanov. - Bishkek: The Center for State Language and Encyclopaedia, 2003. - p. 421. - in Kyrgyz. - Kyrgyz taryhy: Entsiklopedia / Jooptuu redaktor A. Asankanov. - Bishkek: Mamlekettik til jana entsiklopedia borboru, 2003. - 464 p., ill. – ISBN 5-89750-150-5.
- Asanov U.A., Jumanazarova A.Z., Chorotegin T. Kyrgyzskaya nauka v litsakh (The Kyrgyz Science in Faces). - Bishkek, Main Editorial Board of the Kyrgyz Encyclopedy, 2002. p. 499. - ISBN 5-89750-142-4
- Gundula Salk. Die Sanjira Des Togolok Moldo (1860–1942). Wiesbaden. Harrassowitz Verlag. 2009. - S. 2–3. - ISBN 978-3-447-06161-2.
- Karatayev, Olcobay; Yılmaz, Mehmet Serhat; Yakuboğlu, Cevdet. "Dîvânu Lugâti 't-Türk" Adlı Eserin Tamamlanmasının 940. Yıldönümü: Şarkiyatçı, Tarihçi, Antropolog Prof. Dr. Tınçtıkbek K. Çorotegin’in Araştırmaları (940th Anniversary of the Completion of "Dîvânu Lugâti 't-Türk": Researches of Orientalist, Historian, Anthropologist Prof. Dr. Tınçtıkbek K. Çorotegin) // Alınteri Sosyal Bilimler Dergisi. - Kastamonu Üniversitesi, 2017. - Volume 1 (2). pp. 89–99. - ISSN 2564-6583.
