= Jengishbek Nazaraliev =

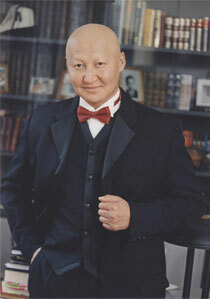
Jenishbek Nazaraliev in 2008.

Jenishbek Nazaraliev (Kyrgyz: Жеңишбек Назаралиев [dʒeŋiʃbek nɑzɑrɑˈlijev]) is a drug rehabilitation professional and politician in Kyrgyzstan. He ran for the presidency in the presidential election of 2009, but withdrew on election day, claiming irregularities in the voting process.

== Life ==
Nazaraliev was born on 8 May 1961 in the city of Tokmok in Soviet Kyrgyzstan. Since he was born the day before Victory day, his parents named him Jenish (meaning "victory" in Kyrgyz). His father was a psychiatrist and his mother was a teacher. Nazaraliev has three brothers (two older, one younger), and two younger sisters.

Since his father was sent to work at a dispensary in Osh, Nazaraliev spent his childhood there, finishing Russian primary school #16. When he was young, he was very interested in sports, and practiced free-style wrestling and Karate.

In 1984, he graduated from the Bishkek National Medical Institute. He first worked at a local psycho-neurological dispensary before moving to Moscow in 1991 for other opportunities. In 1993, he returned to Bishnek and opened the region's first private narcological clinic. The clinic, which is known for using atropine comas and other outdated methods, is still operated by Nazaraliev.

In 1989, he received fame from publishing an article called "Змиелов" ("Snake-catcher" in Russian) in the newspaper Komsomolskaya Pravda.

Nazaraliev is the father of a daughter and a son.

== 2009 presidential election ==
Nazaraliev ran for President of Kyrgyzstan in 2009, his campaign slogan was "Everything's within your reach" (Kyrgyz: "Баардыгы өзүңдүн колуңда"). Nazaraliev withdrew from the election on election day, considering the election illegitimate. In the end, he received 19,283 (0.83%) votes.

== External resources ==
- Nazaraliev's campaign site
- Nazaraliev’s Rehabilitation Center
