= Iskenderbek Aidaraliyev =

Acting Prime Minister of Kyrgyzstan

Prime Minister of Kyrgyzstan Acting
- In office 28 November 2007 – 24 December 2007
- President: Kurmanbek Bakiyev
- Preceded by: Almazbek Atambayev
- Succeeded by: Igor Chudinov

Personal details
- Born: November 13, 1955 (age 69); Jalal-Abad Province, Kirghiz SSR, USSR

Iskenderbek Rysbekovich Aidaraliyev (born 13 November 1955) is a former Acting Prime Minister of Kyrgyzstan. He was appointed to that position on November 28, 2007, following the resignation of Almazbek Atambayev, and was replaced by Igor Chudinov on December 24, 2007, following the December 2007 parliamentary election. Previously, he was Acting First Deputy Prime Minister and had been Governor of Jalal-Abad Province from January 31, 2006 until November 27, 2007. Before that he had been Governor of Talas Province.

Political offices
Preceded by Almazbek Atambayev	Acting Prime Minister of Kyrgyzstan; 2006 - 2007	Succeeded by Igor Chudinov
Preceded by Zhusupzhan Dzheembekov	Governor of Jalal-Abad Province	Succeeded by ?
