= Ainura Ibraimova =

Kyrgyz health professional, civil servant and deputy minister of health

- Айнура Ибраимова
- Born: 19 May 1957 (age 68); Frunze, Kirghiz SSR, Soviet Union (now Bishkek, Kyrgyzstan)
- Occupations: Health professional, civil servant
- Parent: Sultan Ibraimov
- Relatives: Elmira Ibraimova (sister)

Ainura Sultan kyzy Ibraimova (Айнура Султан кызы Ибраимова; born 19 May 1957) is a Kyrgyz health professional, former civil servant and former deputy minister of health.

== Early Years ==
Ibraimova was born on 19 May 1957 in Frunze, in the Soviet Union's Kirghiz Soviet Socialist Republic. She is one of five children of Sultan Ibraimov (1927 – 1980), Chairman of the Council of Ministers of the Kirghiz Soviet Socialist Republic from 22 December 1978 until his assassination in 1980. Elmira Ibraimova, former deputy prime minister of Kyrgyzstan, is her sister.

Ibraimova studied medicine at the Kyrgyz State Medical Academy, where she graduated in 1985. This was followed by post-graduate studies at the Cardiology Center of the USSR Academy of Medical Sciences, where she obtained her doctorate in medicine in 1985. She then served until 1994 in a hospital of the public health service of the Kirghiz Soviet Socialist Republic and subsequently, after independence in December 1990, of the Kyrgyz Republic.

== Public service ==
In 1994 she was among a group of health experts recruited by the Ministry of Health to conceptualize and design a modernized health service system for the country to replace the essentially defunct system inherited from the Soviet period. This team of about 25 consultants, the "Manas Team", completed its work in 1996. As implementation of the new health care and financing system began, Ibraimova undertook further post-graduate studies in health economics at the Centre for Health Economics at the University of York in the United Kingdom. Upon returning to Kyrgyzstan she served from 1997 to 2000 as First Deputy Director General of the Kyrgyz State Health Insurance. In 2000 she was appointed Deputy Minister of Health and Head of the Directorate responsible for the implementation of the mandatory state health insurance system and from 2001 to 2008 she was Deputy Minister of Health and Director General of the Mandatory Health Insurance Fund. Under her leadership the "Manas Taalimi" strategy document was developed, the blueprint for the second phase of the country’s health sector reform.

After leaving government service she worked as a freelance consultant for the WHO Regional Office for Europe. From 2010 to 2015 she was deputy director of the USAID-funded "Quality Health Care Project" (QHCP) in the Central Asian republics. Since 2014 Ibraimova has been Chief-of-Party for two successive longer-term projects, funded by the USAID in Kyrgyzstan, both aimed at strengthening the government's ability to diagnose, treat and cure people drug-resistant tuberculosis (2014-2019 "Defeat Tuberculosis", and 2019-2024 "Cure Tuberculosis").
