= 2017 Kyrgyz presidential election =

- 15 October 2017
- Registered: 3,014,434
- Turnout: 56.32% (▼4.97pp)
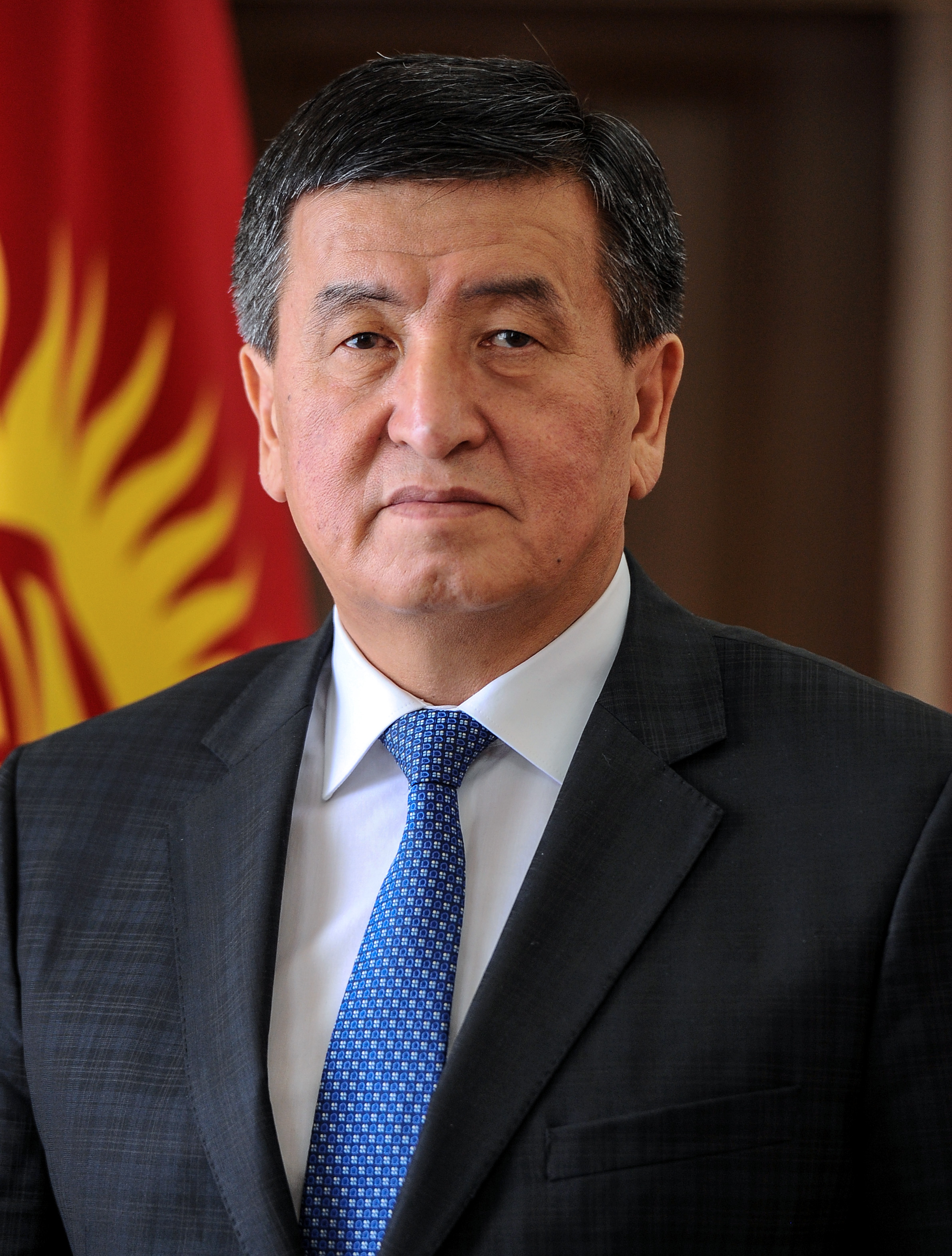

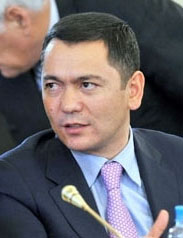

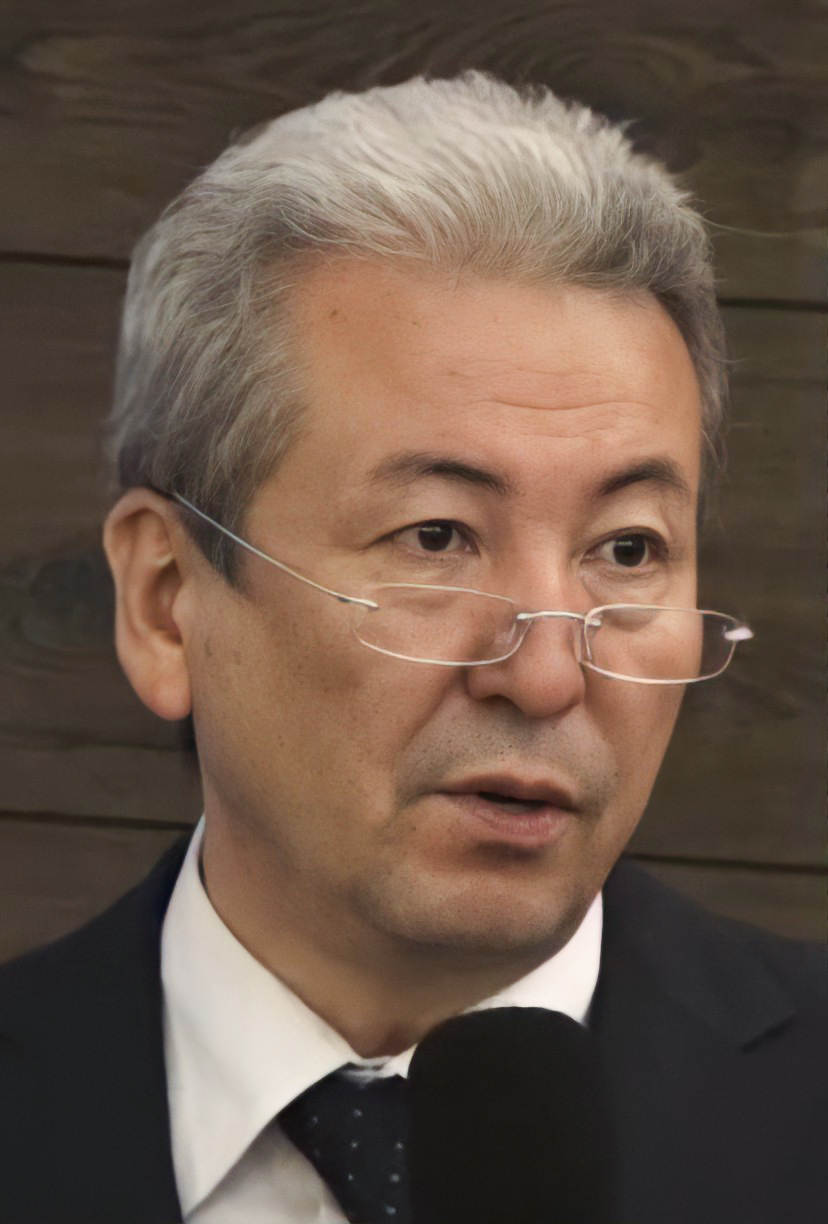
| Nominee | Sooronbay Jeenbekov | Ömürbek Babanov | Adakhan Madumarov |
| Party | SDPK | Independent | Butun Kyrgyzstan |
| Popular vote | 920,620 | 568,665 | 110,284 |
| Percentage | 54.67% | 33.77% | 6.55% |
- Results by district
President before election
Almazbek Atambayev
SDPK
Elected President
Sooronbay Jeenbekov
SDPK

Presidential elections were held in Kyrgyzstan on 15 October 2017. Incumbent President Almazbek Atambayev was not allowed to run again because the constitution sets a single six-year term for the head of state. Eleven candidates registered for the race, and from this field Sooronbay Jeenbekov of the Social Democratic Party of Kyrgyzstan won more than 50% of the vote, avoiding a runoff. Following certification of the results on 30 October, Jeenbekov was inaugurated as President of Kyrgyzstan on 24 November.

The elections marked the first change of president that was not the result of the death of the incumbent or a revolution. Some described the vote as Central Asia's first genuinely competitive presidential election.

== Background ==
The elections were originally scheduled for the third Sunday in November (19 November 2017), but since Atambayev's term was set to expire on 1 December, opposition lawmakers in the Supreme Council demanded that the date be brought forward, so that there would be room for a second round of voting and the inauguration ceremony before 1 December, as to prevent a conflict of law. Atambayev announced on 29 May 2017 that the elections would be held on 15 October.

In December 2016, a referendum was held on strengthening the power of the Prime Minister and was approved by 80% of voters.

In early August 2017, the leaders of three opposition parties – Onuguu–Progress, United Kyrgyzstan, and Respublika–Ata Zhurt – announced the creation of a coalition called Kaira Zharaluu (Revival), which was to field a single candidate – Bakyt Torobayev. This agreement fell through, with each leader registering separately to participate in the election. Going into the election, Temir Sariyev, Ömürbek Babanov, and Sooronbay Jeenbekov, all former prime ministers, were considered to be the leading candidates.

In September 2017, after Kazakh president Nursultan Nazarbayev met Kyrgyz opposition leader Ömürbek Babanov, the Kyrgyz Ministry of Foreign Affairs accused Kazakhstan of interfering in the Kyrgyz election.

== Electoral system ==
The elections were held using the two-round system, although none of the presidential elections held since independence from the Soviet Union had gone to a second round. Under the 2010 constitution, the presidential term is six years. Re-election is not permitted.

In order to register, candidates had to be nominated by a political party or complete the relevant documentation for running as an independent, pay a deposit of 1 million soms, collect signatures from 30,000 registered voters and pass an exam certifying above-average proficiency in the Kyrgyz language. The CEC accepted signatures until the end of 25 August 2017, and registered candidates until 10 September.

== Candidates ==
A total of 59 people initially declared their intention to run for the presidency; 48 self-nominees and 11 nominated by political parties. The Central Election Commission announced on 16 August 2017 that the number of applicants had dropped to 50. One high-profile potential candidate, opposition leader Omurbek Tekebaev, was convicted on corruption and fraud charges on 16 August 2017, and as such could not run for president. On the next day the Central Election Commission invalidated the list of signatures presented by Tekebaev because he violated financing rules.

Jeenbekov resigned as Prime Minister on 21 August 2017, after being named as an official candidate. He stated that he "[wanted] to be in an equal position with other presidential candidates". The incumbent, Atambayev, has been criticised by opponents for using his position to promote the candidacy of Jeenbekov, a longtime ally.

On 26 August, the CEC reported that 24 people had submitted the required number of signatures. Meanwhile, 15 people had failed to provide any signatures and five people had failed the required Kyrgyz language test in addition to not providing signatures. Of the eleven candidates nominated by political parties, six of them—Turat Akimov (Chon Kazat), Kanatbek Isaev (Kyrgyzstan Party), Akhmatbek Keldibekov (Respublika–Ata Zhurt), Iskhak Masaliev (Party of Communists of Kyrgyzstam), and Tursunbek Akun (Human Rights Party)—were all rejected by the CEC for not collecting enough valid signatures from voters.

By 10 September – the end of the registration period – the CEC had rejected a total of 37 people and nine had withdrawn. The remaining 13 were officially registered as participants in the election. Finally, 13 people were registered to participate in the elections and listed on the ballot papers. However, a number of candidates subsequently withdrew; Kamchybek Tashiev decided to withdraw in favour of Sooronbay Jeenbekov on 25 September. On 17 September, Bakyt Torobayev formed an alliance with Ömürbek Babanov and agreed that should Babanov win, he would become prime minister. Yet on 6 October, Torobayev announced his withdrawal from the race. On 13 October, Azimbek Beknazarov bowed out of the race. All three of the above remained on the ballot because they withdrew after the ballot papers had been finalised and printed.

The remaining ten candidates, most of which were independents, were officially registered and participated in the elections:

| Number on ballot | Name | Occupation | Nominated by |
|---|---|---|---|
| 1 | Ernis Zarlykov | Ex-First Vice Mayor of Bishkek | Independent |
| 2 | Toktaiym Umetalieva | Civic activist | Independent |
| 3 | Temir Sariyev | Leader of Akshumkar, ex-Prime Minister (2015–16) | Akshumkar |
| 4 | Ulukbek Kochkorov | Leader of Zhany Door | Independent |
| 5 | Taalatbek Masadykov | International relations specialist | Independent |
| 6 | Ömürbek Babanov | Leader of Respublika–Ata Zhurt, ex-Prime Minister (2011) | Independent |
| 7 | Arstanbek Abdyldayev | Businessman | Independent |
| ~~8~~ | ~~Azimbek Beknazarov~~ | ~~Lawyer~~ | ~~Independent~~ |
| 9 | Sooronbay Jeenbekov | Ex-Prime Minister (2016–17) | Social Democratic Party of Kyrgyzstan |
| 10 | Adakhan Madumarov | Leader of United Kyrgyzstan | United Kyrgyzstan |
| ~~11~~ | ~~Kamchybek Tashiev~~ | ~~Co-chairman of Respublika–Ata Zhurt~~ | ~~Respublika–Ata Zhurt~~ |
| 12 | Arslanbek Maliyev | Leader of Aalam | Independent |
| ~~13~~ | ~~Bakyt Torobayev~~ | ~~Leader of Onuguu–Progress, Member of the Supreme Council of Kyrgyzstan~~ | ~~Onuguu–Progress~~ |

== Opinion polls ==
| Date | Pollster | Sariyev | Babanov | Torobaev | Tekebaev | Jeenbekov | Madumarov | Tursunbek | Undecided | Against all |
|---|---|---|---|---|---|---|---|---|---|---|
| 1–15 July 2017 | SKDS | 18% | 14% | 11% | 7% | 4% | 4% | 3% | 19% | 20% |

Which politicians or public figures do you trust the most? (Three spontaneous answers)

| Date | Pollster | Babanov | Atambaev | Torobaev | Tashiev | Madumarov | Tekebaev | Sariyev | Murzakmatov | Jeenbekov |
|---|---|---|---|---|---|---|---|---|---|---|
| 15 February–2 March 2017 | CISR | 35% | 31% | 11% | 11% | 7% | 7% | 3% | 3% | 3% |

== Conduct ==
A total of 773 international monitors from 59 countries and 44 international organisations were registered to observe the elections,

== Results ==
Establishment candidate Sooronbay Jeenbekov won the elections with more than 50% of the vote. Final results were released within three days of the election. As the results were not disputed, Jeenbekov was inaugurated on 24 November. Election monitors from the Organization for Security and Co-operation in Europe gave a "generally positive" report of the election's fairness, but made note of concerns over "misuse of public resources, pressure on voters and vote buying", as well as media bias and the arrest of opposition leader Omurbek Tekebayev and some of Babanov's supporters before the vote.

| Candidate | Party | Votes | % |
|---|---|---|---|
| Sooronbay Jeenbekov | Social Democratic Party | 920,620 | 54.67 |
| Ömürbek Babanov | Independent | 568,665 | 33.77 |
| Adakhan Madumarov | United Kyrgyzstan | 110,284 | 6.55 |
| Temir Sariyev | Akshumkar | 43,311 | 2.57 |
| Taalatbek Masadykov | Independent | 10,803 | 0.64 |
| Ulukbek Kochkorov | Independent | 8,498 | 0.50 |
| Azimbek Beknazarov | Independent | 2,743 | 0.16 |
| Arstanbek Abdyldayev | Independent | 2,015 | 0.12 |
| Arslanbek Maliyev | Independent | 1,621 | 0.10 |
| Ernis Zarlykov | Independent | 1,554 | 0.09 |
| Toktaiym Umetalieva | Independent | 1,473 | 0.09 |
| Against all | | 12,371 | 0.73 |
| Total | | 1,683,958 | 100.00 |
| Valid votes | | 1,683,958 | 99.18 |
| Invalid/blank votes | | 13,910 | 0.82 |
| Total votes | | 1,697,868 | 100.00 |
| Registered voters/turnout | | 3,014,434 | 56.32 |
Source: CEC, CEC
