= 2007 Kyrgyz parliamentary election =

- 16 December 2007
- All 90 seats in the Supreme Council; 46 seats needed for a majority
- Turnout: 73.86%
Party	Leader	Vote %	Seats	+/–
Ak Jol	Igor Chudinov	61.73	71	New
SDPK	Roza Otunbayeva	9.35	11	+10
KKP	Iskhak Masaliyev	6.95	8	+5
This lists parties that won seats. See the complete results below.
Results by region
Prime Minister before	Prime Minister after
Iskenderbek Aidaraliyev (acting); Independent	Igor Chudinov; Ak Jol

Early parliamentary elections were held in Kyrgyzstan on 16 December 2007. The election was called by President Kurmanbek Bakiyev after the constitutional referendum on 21 October 2007 approved a new electoral system and constitutional reform proposals, enlarging the parliament to 90 MPs and introducing party-list voting.

== Campaign ==
Twenty-two parties filed to run in the election, but some reconsidered and six were rejected by the authorities, including Taza Koom ("Clean Society"). Thus the following parties contested the election:

- Ata Meken Socialist Party ("Fatherland Socialist Party")
- Party of Communists of Kyrgyzstan
- Ar-Namys ("Dignity")
- Aalam ("Universe", party of independent people)
- Erkindik ("Freedom")
- Asaba ("Flag")
- Social Democratic Party of Kyrgyzstan
- Jangy Kuech ("New Force", party of women and youth of Kyrgyzstan)
- Ak Jol ("Bright Path Popular Party")
- Erkin Kyrgyzstan ("Free Kyrgyzstan")
- El Dobushu ("People's Voice")
- Turan

== Controversy ==
On 28 November 2007, Prime Minister Almazbek Atambayev from the Social Democratic Party resigned and Iskenderbek Aidaraliyev became Acting Prime Minister until the election; the resignation was reportedly over differences between Atayev and Bakiyev.

To enter parliament, a party had to pass two thresholds:

- Obtain at least 5% of the vote nationwide
- Obtain at least 0.5% of the vote in each of the country's seven regions and its two cities (Bishkek and Osh)

== Results ==
According to preliminary results based on 81% of the polling stations, turnout was over 60%, but no party apart from Ak Jol had managed to pass both thresholds. Ak Jol reportedly received 47.8% of the vote. Ata Meken received 9.3% of the vote nationwide, but failed the regional thresholds in three regions. Ak Jol therefore appeared to be the only party to enter parliament. International monitors from the Organization for Security and Co-operation in Europe heavily criticised the election. Monitors from the Commonwealth of Independent States, however, claimed the election met democratic standards. Later results showed that two other parties, the Social Democratic Party and the Communist Party, narrowly managed to pass the national threshold.

The Supreme Court overturned the second, regional threshold two days after the vote (thus potentially broadening parliamentary representation from three to four different parties). Final results are expected to be announced on by the end of December.

According to the central electoral commission, Ak Jol received 71 seats, the Social Democratic Party received 11 seats and the Communist Party received 8 seats. It is unclear whether the CEC is ignoring or reinterpreting the Supreme Court ruling which would entitle the Ata Meken party to seats despite failing to win at least 0.5% of the vote in all seven regions and two cities. The newly elected parliament convened on 21 December 2007 for the first time and will have to confirm a new government before 1 January 2008.

According to official results, Ata Meken failed to gain the necessary votes in Osh, yet party activists claimed to have proof of having attained more than the necessary votes.

Party	Votes	%	Seats	+/–
Ak Jol	1,245,331	61.73	71	New
Ata Meken Socialist Party	228,125	11.31	0	New
Social Democratic Party	188,585	9.35	11	+10
Party of Communists	140,258	6.95	8	+5
Turan	55,628	2.76	0	New
Ar-Namys	44,048	2.18	0	New
Erkin Kyrgyzstan	28,315	1.40	0	New
Erkindik	25,753	1.28	0	New
Asaba	23,459	1.16	0	New
Aalam	13,502	0.67	0	New
Glas Naroda	12,074	0.60	0	New
Novaya Sila	5,823	0.29	0	New
Against all	6,481	0.32	–	–
Total	2,017,382	100.00	90	0
Valid votes	2,017,382	99.18		
Invalid/blank votes	16,579	0.82		
Total votes	2,033,961	100.00		
Registered voters/turnout	2,753,727	73.86		
Source: IFES, Ermatov
