= Arstanbek Abdyldayev =

Kyrgyz politician and businessman (1968–2024)

- Арстанбек Абдылдаев
- Born: 28 April 1968; Naryn Region, Kyrgyz SSR, USSR
- Died: 5 January 2024 (aged 55); Moldavanovka, Kyrgyzstan
- Other name: Arstan Alai
- Occupations: Politician; businessman
- Political party: El Uchun (2011 presidential election); Independent (2017 presidential election)

Arstanbek Beishanalievich Abdyldayev (28 April 1968 – 5 January 2024), also known as Arstan Alai, was a Kyrgyz politician and businessman. He most notably was one of 86 initial candidates in the 2011 presidential election, where he received 8,770 votes and came in 9th. During his campaign, he became famous for his promise that there would be no winter, and the West would suffer from floods.

== Career ==
Abdyldayev, a businessman born in the Naryn Region of Kyrgyzstan, was the founder of the El Uchun party. He took part in the 2011 presidential election in Kyrgyzstan but gained less than 0.5 percent of the votes, taking the 9th place out of 16 candidates.

Abdyldayev gained immediate fame after holding a press conference shortly after the election, where he declared that there would be no winter in Kyrgyzstan, and that his home country is the core of the Earth. A year afterwards, he made the claim that Russian President Vladimir Putin is a "complex biorobot," further adding that the Russian President was capable of saving humankind, but only with Kyrgyzstan's help.

Abdyldayev also ran in the 2017 Kyrgyz presidential election, this time as an Independent candidate. He received 0.12 percent of the votes, taking the 8th place out of 10 candidates, most of which also ran as Independents.

In October 2019, Abdyldayev faced prosecution after having declared himself a God. The prosecution was related to other comments made by Abdyldayev in August of the same year, where he announced that the "soul of God" had come to reside in him, and that he would come to reign over the universe by the end of the following year.

== Beliefs ==
Abdyldayev claimed to have received an Ayan (Kyrgyz for "vision of future") from the Cosmos, learning about the "universal energy", "universal program", and the role of the Kyrgyz people in the Universe: "Kyrgyz people are... the inheritors of Mankind's original code", "The nomadic people, the Kyrgyz know the language of Nature", "The Kyrgyz nation will take the role of God and save the universe", "Life on Earth began from the Kyrgyz". According to his words, he had become the "New God" by receiving "the Soul of God" (also known as the "Divine Energy" and "Universe Energy").

The Kyrgyz people, Abdyldayev said, are the most ancient nation, whose "heroes" and "shamans" (including the characters of the Epic of Manas) had the "universal energy" and could perform "magical rites". Furthermore, he constantly predicted the "end of the era of technology" and the coming "Golden Era" or "Era of Equality". In the "Golden Era", as he said, "the human gene will be ready and pineal gland will activate to channel the creative power", while "high-frequency energy will fill the air" and cause "Higher Forces" to enter the human body, turning "anatomy into a new kind of astrology". Those "Higher Forces" were often referred to by him as "aliens" or "angelic spirits". He said that through his "Divine Energy" he could cure disease and control the forces of nature. For example, he claimed to have sent COVID-19 alongside "storms and clouds" to the People's Republic of China because the PRC had not abolished the debt of Kyrgyzstan.

Abdyldayev and his teachings became an Internet meme in the former Soviet Union, with the most popular video about him gathering more than two million views on YouTube.

== Death ==
Abdyldayev was found dead of an apparent suicide by hanging in the canteen of the special medical correctional institution No. 31 of the Kyrgyzstan Penitentiary Service at 05:31 on 5 January 2024. He had been transferred there on 28 December 2023 on the recommendation of a psychiatrist. Abdyldayev was 55.
