= Akbaraly Aitikeev =

Kyrgyzstani politician

Akbaraly Aitikeev (born March 9, 1958) was a candidate in Kyrgyzstan's 2005 and 2011 presidential elections. He combines his career as a businessman, with the chairmanship of the Party of Protection, which he founded in 1996. In both elections, he received less than 5% of the vote.
