= Jypar Jeksheev =

Kyrgyz politician (1947–2020)

Jypar Jeksheev (Kyrgyz Жыпар Жекше; 26 May 1947 – 21 July 2020) was a Kyrgyz politician who founded the Democratic Movement of Kyrgyzstan in 1993. He was born in Taldy-Suu, Issyk Kul in 1947, and was active in Kyrgyz politics from 1989 until his death in 2020. He was active in the democratic movements that emerged near and shortly after the Dissolution of the Soviet Union.
