= United People's Movement (Kyrgyzstan) =

United People's Movement is a coalition currently active in Kyrgyzstan. The coalition was formed in December, 2008 as an umbrella group representing various factions in opposition to Kyrgyz President Kurmanbek Bakiyev, and includes parties such as Ata Meken, Ak Shumkar, Asaba and Jany Kyrgyzstan, as well as the Social Democrats – which is the only party represented in parliament besides the ruling, and pro-Bakiyev, Ak Zhol.

On 20 April 2009, the United People's Movement announced its candidate – Almazbek Atambayev, the leader of the Social Democratic Party of Kyrgyzstan, the only opposition party represented in parliament.
