= Sultan Ibraimov =

Kyrgyz politician (1927–1980)

- Султан Ибраимов

Chairman of the Council of Ministers of the Kirghiz SSR
- In office 22 December 1978 – 4 December 1980
- Preceded by: Ahmatbek Suyumbaev
- Succeeded by: Pyotr Hodos

Personal details
- Born: 20 September 1927 Alchaluu, Kirghiz ASSR, Russian SFSR, Soviet Union (now Chuy Region, Kyrgyzstan)
- Died: 4 December 1980 (aged 53) Cholpon Ata, Kirghiz SSR, Soviet Union (now Kyrgyzstan)
- Resting place: Ala-Archa Cemetery, Bishkek
- Party: Communist Party of the Soviet Union (1954–1980)
- Children: Ainura, Gulmira, Elmira, Ermek, Aibek
- Education: Tashkent Institute of Engineers of Irrigation and Agriculture Mechanization
- Profession: Engineer, civil servant

Sultan Ibraim uulu Ibraimov (Note: Kyrgyz: Султан Ибраим уулу Ибраимов Russian: Султан Ибраимович Ибраимов.) (20 September 1927 – 4 December 1980) was a Soviet politician who served as Chairman of the Council of Ministers of the Kirghiz Soviet Socialist Republic from 22 December 1978 until his assassination in 1980. The slow movement of the investigation created distrust in the Soviet system during a period of intense corruption, and the eventual discovery of the perpetrator's identity as an ethnic Russian ethnonationalist exacerbated ethnic tensions. Since his death, Ibraimov has become an important figure in Kyrgyzstan.

== Early life and career ==
Sultan Ibraimovich Ibraimov was born on 20 September 1927 in the village of Alchaluu, in the north of what was then the Kirghiz Autonomous Socialist Soviet Republic of the Russian SFSR. During the Second World War, Ibraimov first worked on a local kolkhoz before getting a job as a tractor driver for a state company. Afterwards, he entered the Kyrgyz Academy of Sciences, serving as a teacher from 1957 to 1959. From 1961 to 1966, Ibraimov was minister of Land Reclamation and Water Management in the government of Bolot Mambetov.

== Career in Kyrgyzstan ==
In January 1968, Ibraimov was appointed as First Secretary of the Osh Regional Committee of the Communist Party of Kirghizia. Immediately following his taking power, he began a crackdown on corruption in the region, and greatly increased the development of infrastructure. During his ten-year tenure, several roads, residential buildings, hospitals, factories, and hydroelectric power plants were constructed. There was also expansion of canals and reservoirs, in an effort to prevent drought.

Ibraimov was known for his closeness to the people, frequently travelling through Osh region and speaking to farmers, asking about their current conditions. Following these visits, he would speak with other local government officials, promoting the positions of the rural working class. According to one story, Ibraimov assisted firefighters in rescuing workers from a fire at a cotton mill. These actions protected his position and shielded him from allegations of corruption while many other politicians from the Central Asian SSRs were being convicted on charges of corruption during the Uzbek cotton affair.

On 25 August 1978, Ibraimov was promoted to Chairman of the Presidium of the Kirghiz Supreme Soviet. The promotion proved short-lived, for five months had not yet passed before he was again promoted, this time to Chairman of the Council of Ministers of the Kirghiz SSR. This put him in a powerful position, as the de jure head of government of Kirghizia.

Ibraimov also made himself known at the national level as a maverick within the party, on one occasion openly criticising Internal Affairs Minister Nikolai Shchelokov during a meeting of the Supreme Soviet in Moscow, while General Secretary Leonid Brezhnev was in attendance. At the next meeting of the Supreme Soviet, Shchelokov refused to allow Ibraimov's entrance, allegedly saying, "Get out of here, I'm not your minister; you can criticise me elsewhere."

== Assassination ==
On the night of 4 December 1980, Ibraimov, was fatally shot in his sleep while staying at his state-provided mansion in Cholpon-Ata, on Issyk-Kul in northern Kyrgyzstan. Ibraimov's wife, Reva, was awoken by the gunshots, and saw the killer jumping out the window. Ibraimov was 53 years old at the time of his death. Ibraimov's assassination remains shrouded in mysteries to this day. The specialised garrison for protection of government officials within the Kirghiz SSR was on leave, and the two policemen who were meant to be guarding the mansion were not present at the time. According to his daughter Ainura, Ibraimov was coerced by his close allies within the Supreme Soviet into going to the mansion against his will.

=== Investigation ===
Following Ibraimov's assassination, an investigation headed by KGB Deputy Chairman Filipp Bobkov was quickly launched. The events of Ibraimov's assassination were quickly established; first, Ibraimov's personal driver, who had been sleeping on the first floor and had seen the intruder, had been shot. Next, the intruder moved upwards to the second floor before shooting Ibraimov twice in the head while he was sleeping, before jumping out of the window and fleeing the scene.

Though the killer could not be identified, the gun used in the killing was found at the scene. For several months, the investigation remained at a standstill, even after the interrogation of hundreds of suspects. Finally, Bobkov made the choice to examine the fingerprints on the gun - a first in the Soviet Union.

Using fingerprinting, the KGB was able to find the culprit, an ethnic Russian from Cholpon-Ata. He was later found, having been hanged by a scarf, at a train station in Chapayevsk in the Russian SFSR. In his hand there was a note "To the Deputies of the Supreme Soviet of Kyrgyzstan", which was widely circulated in Kyrgyz media and included the names and personal information of the deputies of the Supreme Soviet of the Kirghiz SSR, including Ibraimov.

The assassin was not known to have any personal relations to Ibraimov, but was instead suspected of being a Russian ethnonationalist due to writings in his notebook which professed violently anti-Kyrgyz views. Here, the case ended, but discontent in the Kirghiz SSR mounted, as many suspected that the assassination had been planned by First Secretary of the Communist Party of Kirghizia Turdakun Usubaliev, out of a desire to maintain his position.

== Legacy ==
Following his death, Ibraimov's popularity in Kyrgyzstan surged, and he has since been held in high regard by the Kyrgyz people and political leaders alike, and has become known as a patriotic figure. Almazbek Atambayev throughout his rule repeatedly praised and compared himself to Ibraimov, on one occasion defending himself from allegations of nepotism by saying that he, much like Ibraimov, started out with humble beginnings.

On 29 August 2019, Kyrgyz President Sooronbay Jeenbekov posthumously awarded him with the Hero of the Kyrgyz Republic award, the highest state award of Kyrgyzstan. Ibraimov Street in Bishkek was named in his honour in 1993 from its original name of Pravda Street, and Papan Reservoir is also officially named after him. There is also a memorial to Ibraimov near Osh Kyrgyz Drama Theater, also named after him.

Ibraimov's children have continued to serve in the Kyrgyz political scene. His son Ermek served as the Kyrgyz ambassador to Turkey, Belarus, Poland, the Czech Republic, Slovakia, Hungary, Latvia, and Estonia. One of his daughters, Elmira, served as chairperson of the Audit Chamber of Kyrgyzstan, Kyrgyz ambassador to the United Nations, founding and long-time chairperson of the community development agency ARIS, and Deputy Prime Minister. Another daughter, Ainura, a health professional, served as deputy minister of health.
