= Kubatbek Baibolov =

Kyrgyzstani politician

Kubatbek Baibolov (born 2 Jan 1952) (Russian: Кубатбек Байболов) was an Interior Minister of Kyrgyzstan. He also served as commander of Jalal-Abad.

Before becoming a politician, he served as a KGB colonel and then as a businessman.

In 2006 he chaired the constituent assembly responsible for drafting a new constitution
