= Igor Chudinov =

Kyrgyz politician (born 1961)

- Игорь Чудинов
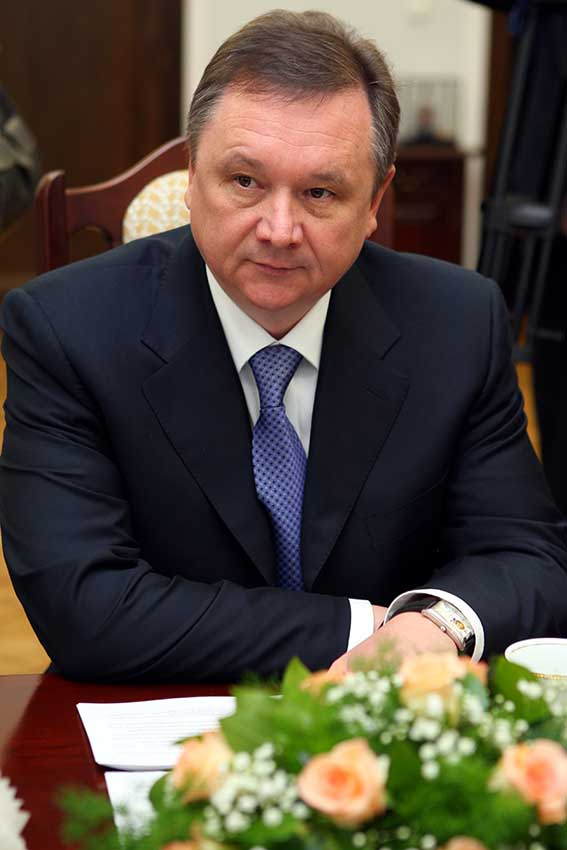
- Chudinov in 2008

12th Prime Minister of Kyrgyzstan
- In office 24 December 2007 – 21 October 2009
- President: Kurmanbek Bakiyev
- Preceded by: Iskenderbek Aidaraliyev (Acting)
- Succeeded by: Daniar Usenov

Personal details
- Born: 21 August 1961 (age 64) Frunze, Kirghiz SSR, USSR, (now Bishkek, Kyrgyzstan)
- Party: Ak Jol

Igor Vitalyevich Chudinov (Russian: Игорь Витальевич Чудинов; born 21 August 1961) is a former Prime Minister of Kyrgyzstan. He was appointed to that position on 24 December 2007, following the resignation of Iskenderbek Aidaraliyev. Prior to his appointment, he was an energy and industry minister in the Kyrgyz government.

== Early life and career ==
Chudinov was born on August 21, 1961 in the city of Frunze. In 1983, he graduated from the Kyrgyz State University with a degree in mathematics. That same year, he began working as a software engineer at the Frunze Computer Plant. In 1990, he took up the post of second secretary of the Central Committee of the Leninist Communist Youth Union (Komsomol) of the Republic. From 1991 to 1992, Chudinov attended the International Business School in Moscow. He was then was involved in business from 1994 to 2005. In the spring of 2005, information surfaced that Chudinov had "recently headed a company supplying energy resources to Kyrgyzstan."

== Prime Minister ==
Chudinov was nominated for the position by the Ak Zhol party, which won a large majority of seats in the Kyrgyz parliament - the Jogorku Kenesh - in the elections of 16 December 2007. He was confirmed as prime minister by President Kurmanbek Bakiyev on 24 December.

=== Economic policy ===
During his tenure, Chudinov focused on stimulating the country's economic development, particularly in the areas of agriculture, mining, energy, and tourism. One of his key policies was to support projects to develop the processing industry, initiatives to increase agricultural exports, and the creation of a state reserve fund financed by revenues from gold mining.

Additionally, he focused on deepening cooperation with Russia and Kazakhstan, and took steps to normalize relations with Uzbekistan, a key supplier of natural gas to the region. His government also sought to increase the attraction of foreign investment, particularly in energy and infrastructure projects. On 21 September 2009, Chudinov was named Honorary President of the Kyrgyz-North America Trade Council, in recognition of his role in promoting trade and investment between the USA/Canada and Kyrgyzstan.

=== Energy ===
In energy policy, Chudinov advocated the construction and modernization of hydroelectric power plants, as well as the diversification of the country's energy sources to reduce dependence on imported electricity. He actively promoted Kyrgyzstan internationally as a promising destination for ecotourism, emphasizing the republic's unique natural resources.

== Post-premiership ==
On November 6, 2009, Chudinov was appointed General Director of the Development Fund of the Kyrgyz Republic. Following the Kyrgyz Revolution, in August 2010, he was arrested on charges of abuse of office and misuse of a government loan. On August 12 of that year, he was released on bail. Following the October 2015 Kyrgyz parliamentary election, he became a Deputy of the Jogorku Kenesh. On December 19, 2017, Igor Chudinov was found guilty of abuse of office and sentenced to a large fine. On June 14, 2018, the Central Electoral Commission of Kyrgyzstan expelled Chudinov from parliament.

On 14 May 2024, Chudinov was appointed the General Director of the Directorate of Power Plants under Construction OJSC, under the Ministry of Energy of Kyrgyzstan. Later that day, President Sadyr Japarov canceled the order, reprimanding Energy Minister Taalaibek Ibraev for the fact that he was not informed about the decision.

== Personal life ==
As his surname implies, he is Russian of Chud heritage, and does not speak Kyrgyz.

Political offices
| Preceded by Iskenderbek Aidaraliyev; Acting | Prime Minister of Kyrgyzstan; 2007–2009 | Succeeded by Daniar Usenov |
