= Ak Jol =

Political party in Kyrgyzstan

Bright Path People's Party Ак Жол элдик партиясы
- Leader: Igor Chudinov
- Founder: Kurmanbek Bakiyev
- Founded: 15 October 2007
- Dissolved: 15 April 2010
- Preceded by: People's Movement of Kyrgyzstan
- Headquarters: Toktogul 175, Bishkek
- Ideology: Kyrgyz nationalism National conservatism Communitarianism; Pro-welfare state Pro-free markets Authoritarianism; Illiberalism; Crony capitalism (accused)
- Political position: Centre-right
- Colours: White; Red

Website
- akjolnarod.kg

The Ak Jol People's Party (Kyrgyz: Ак Жол элдик партиясы), also simply Ak Jol (Ак Жол, IPA: [ɑq ˈdʒoɫ]), was a political party in Kyrgyzstan, founded by President Kurmanbek Bakiyev on 15 October 2007 to contest the parliamentary election that was held in December 2007.

It gained 71 of the 90 seats in the 2007 elections and was one of the three parties to enter into the parliament, obtaining most of its support from the south of the country. However, following the Kyrgyz Revolution of 2010, snap elections were called, and the party lost all of its seats. It did not re-enter parliament thereafter, and it is defunct.

== Election results ==
=== Jogorku Kenesh ===
| Election | Leader | Votes | % | Seats | +/– | Government |
|---|---|---|---|---|---|---|
| 2007 | Igor Chudinov | 1,245,331 | 61.73 (#1) | 71 / 90 | | Supermajority |

=== Presidential ===
| Election | Candidate | First round | | Second round | | Result |
| Election | Candidate | Votes | % | Votes | % | Result |
|---|---|---|---|---|---|---|
| 2009 | Kurmanbek Bakiyev | 1,779,417 | 77.44 | | | Won |
