= Judiciary of Kyrgyzstan =

The judicial system of Kyrgyzstan comprise a number of courts:

- Constitutional Court of Kyrgyzstan
- Supreme Court of Kyrgyzstan
- Military Courts of Kyrgyzstan (until December 2016)
- Appeal courts of second instance at the oblast level
- Local courts of first instance. There were 78 of these in 2008.

== Courts ==
The Constitutional Court is the highest body responsible for the protection of the Constitution of Kyrgyzstan. It was abolished on 7 April 2010 with the adoption of the 2010 constitution and its powers transferred to the Supreme Court. In 2021, however, the Constitutional Court was re-established as a result of a new version of the constitution. It consists of a chairman, a deputy chairman and seven other judges. Judges must be elected by a majority of the members of the Jogorku Kenesh, the parliament of Kyrgyzstan. The chairman is selected by the President of Kyrgyzstan and a majority of the Jogorku Kenesh for a term of five years (previously 15 years). The chairman in turn nominates the deputy chairman, who is approved by the president, also for a five-year term.

The Supreme Court is the highest judicial body with "civil, criminal, and administrative jurisdiction". It consists of a chairman, a deputy chairman and 20 judges.

In addition, an informal method of dispute resolution exists for "minor civil, family, labor, and property disputes" called aksakal courts. Aksakal means "white beard" in the Kyrgyz language and refers to village elders who run such courts outside the formal legal system but sanctioned by the constitution. The members must be over 50 years old, have a secondary education, have resided in the area for at least five years and be respected. As of 2025, about 84% were men, 16% women. This harkens back to the biys, elected judges and administrators of the Kazakh Khanate, which lasted until the early 19th century, and was not abolished until the 1920s.

== Concerns ==
Longstanding concerns have been expressed about the neutrality of the courts. Askar Akayev, the president of Kyrgyzstan from 1990 to 2005, used the courts against his political enemies. On 25 October 2022, at least 20 government critics were jailed.

Non-governmental organisations exist to monitor selection and rotation processes within the judiciary, including the Institute for Public Analysis, headed by Rita Karasartova.

== See also ==
- Central Electoral Commission of Kyrgyzstan
- Council for the Selection of Judges
