= Klara Sooronkulova =

Kyrgyzstani lawyer (born 1969)

- Клара Сооронкулова
- Born: 18 March 1969 (age 57); Sopu-Korgon, Kirghiz SSR, Soviet Union
- Education: Kyrgyz National University
- Occupations: Lawyer; judge
- Known for: Serving on the Supreme Court of Kyrgyzstan

Klara Syrgakbekovna Sooronkulova (Kyrgyz: Клара Сыргакбековна Сооронкулова; born 18 March 1969) is a Kyrygzstani lawyer and activist. After contributing to the creation of a new constitution following the 2010 Kyrgyz Revolution, she became a judge on the Supreme Court of Kyrgyzstan from 2011 until her dismissal in 2015. Since then, Sooronkulova has become known as a human rights activist, which led to her being imprisoned between 2022 and 2024.

== Early life and education ==
Sooronkulova was born on 18 March 1969 in Sopu-Korgon in what was then the Kirghiz Soviet Socialist Republic. After completing high school, she moved to Bishkek to study law; by the time she graduated in 1992, Kyrgyzstan had become an independent country following the dissolution of the Soviet Union. Between 1994 and 2011, Sooronkulova worked as a law professor at Kyrgyz National University.

== Judicial career ==
In 2010, following the Kyrgyz Revolution which saw the fall of the government of Kurmanbek Bakiyev, Sooronkulova took part in the drafting of a new constitution that aimed to promote democratisation in Kyrgyzstan, including the transition from a presidential republic to parliamentarism. The constitution was adopted following a referendum held in June 2010. Between 2010 and 2011, Sooronkulova was a member of the Central Election Commission, which was responsible for overseeing elections and referendums, including the first post-revolution elections.

In 2011, Sooronkulova became a member of the Supreme Court of Kyrgyzstan, acting as a judge in its constitutional law chamber. In 2015, the court heard a case around a 2014 law which introduced a biometric voter registration system ahead of elections the following year. Introduced by the government of Almazbek Atambayev, who stated the measures would prevent electoral manipulation, human rights groups claimed that the system would breach citizens' rights, including to data privacy. Sooronkulova provided an advisory in which she concluded that the biometric system was "incompatible" with the Kyrgyzstani constitution. A subsequent vote by the chamber ruled that the 2014 law was constitutional, and an investigation was opened into Sooronkulova's conduct.

The investigation lasted six days instead of the usual two months, and Sooronkulova was not permitted a hearing to present her views; on 18 June 2015, Sooronkulova was removed as a judge, citing "disciplinary issues" including her criticisms of supporters of the 2014 law. Sooronkulova described the decision as a "blatant and shameless display of executive power" and expressed concern for the independence of the judiciary. A demonstration in support of Sooronkulova was held on 24 June in front of the Supreme Council and the White House, and the Council of Europe's advisory Venice Commission called on Kyrgyzstani authorities to review Sooronkova's dismissal.

== Political career ==
After leaving the Supreme Court, Sooronkulova worked for a time at the University of Central Asia in Bishkek, before focusing more in politics. She became a noted critic of Atambayev, condemning his government's legal action against independent media outlets, which she said was a violation of the constitutionally-guaranteed right to freedom of the press.

In March 2019, Sooronkulova joined the executive committee of the Ulutar Birimdigi party, led by Melis Myrzakmatov. In 2020, she left the party to join the newly founded Reforma party, where she elected chairwoman. She led crowdfunding efforts to enable the party to contest in the 2020 elections; she was top of the party's list, but was not elected to the Supreme Council after the party failed to reach the 7% threshold to enter parliament, ultimately receiving 1.64% of the vote. Sooronkulova took part in protests that led to the 2020 Kyrgyz Revolution, stating that the election had been marred by electoral manipulation and vote buying, and criticising the "true lawlessness" during campaigning and election day. The election results went on to be annulled, and Sooronbay Jeenbekov resigned as president.

On 11 November 2020, Sooronkulova was announced as the Reforma candidate for the 2021 presidential elections. She was the only woman among 17 candidates. She received 0.99% of the votes, placing seventh; she notably received 4.76% of the vote in Bishkek.

On 12 November 2026, Sooronkulova notified the Central Election Commission that she intended to run as a candidate in the 2027 Kyrgyz presidential election as an independent candidate.

== Activism ==
As a human rights activist, Sooronkulova founded the non-governmental organisations School of Law and the Committee to Protect Political Prisoners.

On 22 October 2022, Sooronkulova, alongside Rita Karasartova, Gulnara Dzhurabayeva, Asya Sasykbayeva and Perizat Suranova, formed the Committee for Protection of the Kempir-Abad Reservoir over a secret border deal between Kyrgyzstan and Uzbekistan which they raised concerns could endanger local water security from the Kempir-Abad Reservoir.They were arrested the following day, accused of "conspiring to organise mass riots", and, in January 2023, of "forcible seizure of power".

In February 2023, Sooronkulvoa was hospitalised after going on hunger strike to protest her detention. The United Nations Working Group on Arbitrary Detention determined that the government of Kyrgyzstan violated international human rights law by subsequently detaining the women the following day and were imprisoned for five months before being transferred to house arrest between March and June 2023 . Their trial began on 22 June 2023; on 14 June 2024, the women were acquitted, they remained on house arrest pending an appeal, which ended on 14 July 2024.
