= 2007 Constitution of Kyrgyzstan =

2007–2010 constitution of Kyrgyzstan

A new constitution of Kyrgyzstan was passed by referendum on 21 October 2007. It is based on the first post-Soviet constitution originally adopted on 5 May 1993.

The 1993 constitution had been amended several times: first on 10 February 1996, then on 2 February 2003, and finally twice in quick succession on 9 November 2006 and 15 January 2007 after the Tulip Revolution of March 2005. The last two amendments were adopted under pressure from protracted public protests in the capital Bishkek, but they were annulled in September 2007 by the Constitutional Court, which restored the 2003 constitution and paved the way for another constitutional referendum in October 2007. The description that follows is based on the text of the October 2007 constitution.

This constitution was replaced by the 2010 Constitution of Kyrgyzstan in June 2010.

== Article 1 ==
The Kyrgyz Republic (Kyrgyzstan) is a sovereign, unitary, democratic, constitutional, secular, social state. The citizens of the Kyrgyz Republic elect the President, the representatives to the Supreme Assembly (Jogorku Kenesh), and the representatives to local keneshi (council). The election is free and is based on equal, general, direct, and secret voting.

== Article 4 ==
The Kyrgyz Republic recognizes private, municipal, state, and other forms of property. Land and other natural resources may also be in private, municipal, state, and other forms of property.

== Article 5 ==
The state language of the Kyrgyz Republic is the Kyrgyz language. The Russian language is used as the official language of the Kyrgyz Republic. The Kyrgyz Republic guarantees to all nationalities forming the Kyrgyz people the right of preserving the native language and creating the conditions for its teaching and development.

== Article 8 ==
No religion may be recognized as the state or mandatory religion in the Kyrgyz Republic. The Kyrgyz republic recognizes political diversity. The merging of state and party institutions is prohibited. Creation of parties based on religious principles is prohibited. Religious organizations and religious figures may not interfere in the affairs of the government.

== Article 12 ==
The constitution is the supreme law of the Kyrgyz Republic.

== Other chapters ==
- Chapter 2 (articles 13-41) deals with human rights, individual freedoms, and basic duties of citizens.
- Chapter 3 (articles 42-53) is devoted to the institution of the President. The President is elected for five years and the same person may not serve more than two consecutive terms (Article 43). The President appoints the Prime Minister and the members of the government (Article 46), which implies that Kyrgyzstan is a presidential republic.
- Chapter 4 (articles 54-67) describes the Jogorku Kenesh, Kyrgyzstan's unicameral parliament. The parliament consists of 90 members elected for five years in proportional party-list voting (Article 54).
- Chapter 5 (articles 68-76) describes the executive branch. The government is organized into ministries and state committees. If consists of the Prime Minister, Deputy Prime Ministers, ministers, and chairmen of state committees (Article 68). The executive power in provinces and districts is vested in organs of local state administration (Articles 75-76).
- Chapters 6-7 (articles 77-92) are devoted to the judicial branch. The judges are independent and obey only the Constitution and the laws (Article 83). The nine-member Constitutional Court is the supreme judicial authority entrusted with the protection of the Constitution (Article 85).
- Chapter 8 (articles 93-97) deals with local self-government in Kyrgyz Republic. Local self-government is implemented by local communities or their elected local representatives (Article 93). The system of local self-government consists of heads of districts, villages, and municipalities and local keneshi – locally elected representative assemblies (Article 94).
- Chapter 9 sets out the referendum-based procedures for changing the constitution.

== Powers as outlined ==
=== Draft ===
The first draft of the constitution put the National Security Service and the Prosecutor-General's Office under the control of the legislative branch of government. The president would need legislative approval to dismiss heads of the Central Election Commission and the Accounting Chamber. The political party with the most members in parliament would appoint the Prime Minister. Parliament membership would be increased from 75 to 90 seats. Opposition lawmaker Azimbek Beknazarov said, "With regard to the formation of the government, if a party wins more than 50 percent of the seats in parliament, one of its representatives will automatically be prime minister. If no party has a majority, then the president will entrust the party that garnered the most votes with the task of choosing a prime minister. The prime minister will form the government that will be approved by the president."

=== Compromise amendments ===
Parliamentary members agreed to two of Bakiyev's amendments to the draft constitution: his signature as one of the co-authors of the constitution and the president's right to appoint local judges. Opposition lawmaker Temir Sariyev said that if the government fails to "adopt a new constitution and send people home by this evening, then we may find ourselves in a difficult situation. The president had to understand that. There are, in the history of a state, some important moments. Our only demand is that Bakiyev quickly implement the reforms. The president must do that; he must behave like a responsible politician." Bakiyev will remain President and Felix Kulov will remain Prime Minister until 2010 because Bakiyev signed the Constitution.

== Prior to approval ==
=== Protests ===
The For Reforms! opposition coalition announced on 2006-11-01 that it planned to have 10,000 supporters in the streets of Bishkek the following day, protesting the perceived lack of constitutional reform that Bakiyev had promised when voters elected him in July, 2005. Twenty-five opposition legislators had also called on Bakiyev to approve a new constitution or resign and accused the administration of failing to deal with corruption and rising crime. The Kyrgyz government responded by issuing a press release stating that "Kyrgyzstan is going through one of the most crucial moments in its history... The government calls for wisdom, dialogue, and cooperation from all political forces with the goal of preserving peace and stability for the sake of the future democracy and civilized development of Kyrgyzstan."

As the opposition coalition had promised, thousands of For Reforms! demonstrators set up tents and yurts in Bishkek's Ala-Too square. The protesters carried placards, made speeches and played patriotic music in the square and outside the presidential office building nearby, while hundreds of policemen monitored the situation. Bishkek police estimated there were 5,000 protesters, while BBC News correspondents estimated there were at least 10,000. Many business owners closed and boarded up their shops, fearing a repeat of the looting that took place during the Tulip Revolution of 2005, should Bakiyev and the opposition fail to reach a compromise. On November 3, Prime Minister Felix Kulov accused the opposition of attempting to stage a coup, based on the security services' recording of alleged conversations between opposition leaders. However, Bakiyev played down this threat, stating that "There are no forces to carry out a coup. But there are intentions." Opposition leaders rejected the allegations.

The protests reached their peak on November 7 when For Reforms! protesters and pro-Bakiyev demonstrators clashed violently in the square in front of the parliament building. Several people were injured in the confrontation and riot police used tear gas to disperse the crowd.

=== Attacks on the media ===
Marat Tokoyev, the head of Journalists, a non-governmental organization, complained on November 8 that the websites of AKIpress and 24.kg news agencies were hacked on November 2. As a result of the attacks, both websites were rendered inaccessible from outside Kyrgyzstan until November 7. Officials for Tazar.kg, another media outlet, said hackers destroyed their news archive, forcing the temporary closure of their website. Independent TV stations NTS and Piramida also experienced transmission problems during the protests, which they attributed to unidentified attackers.

== Approval in Parliament ==
On 2006-11-08 the speaker of the Supreme Council of Kyrgyzstan, Marat Sultanov, announced that the legislature had passed a new constitution after reading the document out loud twice. Following the readings he said, "Now, dear colleagues, I suggest that you vote this proposal -- sorry, this constitution -- in the second reading. Please, proceed!...The [constitution] is adopted by 65 'yes' votes!" Members of parliament then cheered. Of the 71 members of the Supreme Council, 68 voted for the new constitution. Three did not vote quickly enough to be counted when Sultanov made the announcement. Cheers followed parliamentary member Akmatmek Kedilbekov's statement that "it is the nation that won. Both the president and the opposition won!" The entire Parliamentary session took less than an hour.

State Secretary Adakhan Madumarov told the members of parliament prior to the session that Bakiyev approved the draft and signed amendments allowing the parliament to pass the constitution. When reporters asked Madumarov why Bakiyev had taken so long to sign the amendments, Madumarov replied, "Long? You know how heavy those legislative procedures are. Every single dot, every single comma must be examined by legal experts and they must then give their conclusions to the president. This is the norm for all [draft] laws, not only for this one. But rest assured that the president will sign it today."

== Post approval controversy ==
Even though Bakiyev signed the new constitution into law on November 9, its contents continued to be revised over the following months amid much political turmoil culminating in the resignation of the cabinet, including Prime Minister Felix Kulov, on 2006-12-19. Following the resignation, Bakiyev pushed for revisions to the November constitution to be passed that would hand back much of the presidential powers ceded to parliament by the previous version. After much political wrangling a new constitution was passed by the legislature on 2006-12-30 and signed into law by Bakiyev on 2007-01-15. This version reversed many of the changes of the November constitution, empowering the president to, among other things, nominate the Prime Minister subject to the legislature's confirmation and to appoint and dismiss regional governors and security chiefs without parliamentary approval. Opposition lawmaker Azimbek Beknazarov remarked, "By the new edition of the Constitution, the President Kurmanbek Bakiev has more power, than his predecessor Askar Akaev", alleging that more than 40 amendments appeared in the new constitution while the parliament had approved only seven.

== Constitutional Court ruling ==
On 14 September 2007, the Constitutional Court of Kyrgyzstan ruled that the two packages of amendments were both illegal and stated that the 2003 constitution was legally in effect. In response, President Bakiyev called a constitutional referendum for 21 October 2007.

== See also ==
- Constitution of Kazakhstan
- People's Movement of Kyrgyzstan
- Elections in Kyrgyzstan
- Tulip Revolution
- Askar Akayev
