= Social Democrats (Kyrgyzstan) =

Social Democrats Социал-демократтар Социал-демократы
- Abbreviation: SDK
- Leader: Temirlan Sultanbekov
- Founders: Almazbek Atambayev; Seidbek Atambayev
- Founded: 23 December 2019
- Split from: Social Democratic Party of Kyrgyzstan
- Ideology: Social democracy Direct democracy Pro-Westernism
- Political position: Centre-left
- International affiliation: Socialist International Progressive Alliance
- Colours: Blue; Red
- Supreme Council: 0 / 90
- Bishkek City Council: 5 / 45
- Kara-Balta City Council: 5 / 20
- Shopokov City Council: 6 / 20
- Cholpon-Ata City Council: 6 / 20
- Orlovka City Council: 4 / 20
- Kemin City Council: 4 / 20
- Kant City Council: 2 / 20
- Local councils: 780 / 7,000

Website
- https://sdk.kg/

The Social Democrats (Kyrgyz: Социал-демократтар, romanized: Sotsial-demokrattar; Russian: Социал-демократы, romanized: Sotsial-demokraty; SDK) is a political party in Kyrgyzstan founded in late 2019 by supporters of former president Almazbek Atambayev – legal successor from the Social Democratic Party of Kyrgyzstan (SDKP). After a conflict between Atambaev and his successor president Sooronbai Jeenbekov emerged and deepened in 2018, Atambayev accused of Jeenbekov in attempting to seize authority over the SDKP, a party that Atambayev himself formed in 1990s and served as a leader of. The SDK participated in the annulled 2020 parliamentary election. The current party leader is Temirlan Sultanbekov.

In the 2021 parliamentary election, the main candidate from the SDK was Almazbek's youngest son, Kadyrbek Atambaev.

== Foundation of the party ==
The Social Democratic Party of Kyrgyzstan is one of the oldest political parties in independent Kyrgyzstan. Formed at the congress on September 25, 1993, registered in 1994. Social Democrats party of Kyrgyzstan was represented in all convocations of the Jogorku Kenesh.

== Tulip revolution ==
The party played a key role in the Tulip Revolution of 2005. Tulip was a symbol of Kyrgyz Social Democratic party in 2005. With its active participation in protests and decisive speeches against corruption and authoritarianism, leader of the party Almazbek Atambayev became a leading force for democratic change. Atambayev, leader of the party at that time, oriented his party towards the fight for the establishment of a rule of law and justice, attracting many supporting citizens. Under his leadership, the Social Democratic Party actively supported and mobilized protesters, becoming one of the organizers of mass rallies that ultimately led to the overthrow of President Askar Akayev. Atambayev used his position to call for democratic reforms and the improvement of human rights in the country. After the Tulip revolution, Kurmanbek Bakiyev was elected as president of Kyrgyzstan, while from September 2005 to April 2006, Atambayev was the Minister of Industry, Trade and Tourism.

== Fight against regime of Kurmanbek Bakiyev ==
Following the resignation of Prime Minister Azim Isabekov on 29 March 2007, leader of the party – Atambayev – was appointed acting Prime Minister by President Kurmanbek Bakiyev. He was then confirmed in parliament by a vote of 48–3 on 30 March. It was the first prime minister in Central Asia came from an opposition party. On June 15, 2009, Atambayev was registered as a single opposition candidate. He opposed the incumbent President Kurmanbek Bakiyev. In the elections of July 23, 2009, it was announced that Atambaev won only 7% of the vote, but opposition parties and independent observers announced massive fraud, pressure and intimidation of voters during the voting. Almazbek Atambayev was poisoned during the elections, losing a huge part of the body weight, and was forced to undergo treatment in Turkey.

=== Parliamentary elections of 2008 ===
As a result of the constitutional reform in 2007, the parliament began to be formed according to party lists. Kurmanbek Bakiyev quickly created the Ak Zhol party to take the majority of seats in the parliament. Social-Democrats won 11 seats, despite many harsh violations in Kyrgyz elections.

As more loyal to the party in power of that period. In those years, representatives of the Social Democrats became strong oppositionary force in the parliament. Thus, Irina Karamushkina sealed her mouth in the presence of the media in response to the remarks of Vice Speaker Kubanychbek Isabekov to control her speech in parliament. Baktybek Beshimov, the leader of the Social Democrats faction, in September 2009, speaking with a lecture to students in Washington, announced that he had secretly left Kyrgyzstan through the territory of Kazakhstan. Then he issued a statement to the media: "I was forced to temporarily leave the country due to a direct attempt to physically destroy me after a long, targeted persecution."

== Revolution of 2010 ==
The confrontation between the regime of K. Bakiyev and the opposition continued to grow. On April 6, 2010, Bakiyev ordered the preventive arrest of most of the leaders of opposition political parties in Bishkek. Among those arrested was Atambaev, to whose house a group of special forces "Alpha" of the National Security Service was sent. At first, the special forces sawed his door, but then Atambaev came out and surrendered. He was sent to a pre-trial detention center. However, the next day, April 10, 2010, supporters of Atambaev and other opposition parties took the White House in Bishkek, overthrowing the regime of K. Bakiev, who fled the city. The demonstrators on the same day released all those arrested the day before, including Atambaev. They formed the Provisional Government. After the April Revolution, since April 7, 2010, Deputy Head of the Interim Government for Economics. He held this position until July 13, 2010. On October 10, 2010, Atambayev was elected to the Jogorku Kenesh of the 5th convocation from the Social Democrats party and headed the party faction. In December 2010, a coalition majority consisting of the Respublika, Social Democrats and Ata-Jurt parties was created in the Kyrgyz parliament, which nominated leader of Social Democrats – Atambayev – for the post of prime minister of the country. It was approved by Parliament on December 17, 2010.

In memory of the victims of the April Revolution and the need to fight family and clan regimes, the April TV channel was opened in the party. Atambayev built a mosque on April 7 from his own funds, in honor of those who died that day from the bloody regime of Kurmanbek Bakiyev.

== Democratic reforms of the party ==
=== Democratic rankings ===
The period of the social democrats in government (2010–2017) was marked by substantial gains across major international democracy and governance indices. In Reporters Without Borders’ World Press Freedom Index, Kyrgyzstan rose by 70 places—from 159th to 89th—ranking second worldwide for improvement over that span. Freedom House’s Freedom in the World score increased by roughly 20 points (on the 0–100 scale), shifting the country’s assessment from “Not Free” toward “Partly Free”; by point gain, Kyrgyzstan was among the only eight global improvers and placed fifth. The Economist Intelligence Unit’s Democracy Index grew by approximately 1.49 points (from 3.62 to 5.11) and by 21 ranks, also placing the country among the top-ten improvers. In Transparency International’s Corruption Perceptions Index, the score improved by about nine points and 29 places (from 22/100 to 29/100), one of the top-20 advances among 180 states. Taken together, movements in press freedom, political rights and civil liberties, and institutional performance highlight period of social democrats in Kyrgyz government as an unusually strong period of democratic indicator growth for Kyrgyzstan relative to regional peers and broader global trends.

By the end of 2017, Kyrgyzstan’s RSF - freedom of speech - score (69.08) was on par with that of Greece (69.11), a European Union member, and surpassed the scores of countries such as Israel, Bulgaria, Ukraine, and North Macedonia.

=== Biometric elections ===
A landmark event during the work of Social Democratic party is the introduction of biometric passports and a biometric electoral system that ensured the transparency of elections and excluded the possibility for one citizen to vote several times. It became possible to vote only after identifying one's fingerprint. While the party was in power, the country introduced a system of participation in elections based on biometric data, which dramatically increased the transparency of the voting procedure and eliminated many opportunities for falsification. The 2014 law "On Biometric Registration of Citizens of the Kyrgyz Republic" played an important role in the development of the institution of democratic elections.

The European Union assisted Kyrgyzstan and Social Democratic party in organizing the parliamentary (2015) elections, which were found to be fair and competitive. Atambayev, who became president of the country, negotiated this assistance during his visit to Brussels during negotiations with the President of the European Parliament Martin Schulz and the President of the European Council Herman Van Rompuy in 2013. Also at that time, Atambayev had an active dialogue with the President of the European Commission, Jose Manuel Barroso. Alexander Soros positively reviewed digitalization efforts of Kyrgyz government in Taza Koom project.

=== Constitutional Referendum and development of parliamentary system ===
The Social Democrats presided over a constitutional referendum which proposed that the increasing the powers of the Prime Minister and his/her government, as well as reforms to the judicial system. International experts – Carnegie Endowment - positively assessed the transition to a parliamentary form of government by constitutional reform, the strengthening of the role of the prime minister and parliament thanks to the constitutional reform, as well as the fact that it was supposed to stabilize the institution of power as opposed to the growing spread of Islamist ideology in the country. The changes were approved with a landslide majority of close to 80% of the Kyrgyz population. Atambaev chose to step away from the second presidential term and abide the Constitution despite Russian Vladimir Putin and Kazakh Nursultan Nazarbayev asking him to stay in power.

George Soros spoke positively about Almazbek Atambayev, stating that "Kyrgyzstan was lucky to have a non-corrupt president", noting that the coming to power of a person who is not mired in corruption is good for the democratic development of the country.

=== Memory of the Central Asian revolt of 1916 ===
During the rule of the Social Democrats, Kyrgyzstan became the only Central Asian country in the history of the region that honored the memory of the victims of the 1916 massacre carried out by the punitive troops of the Russian Empire. This event, known as the Urkun or Central Asian Revolt of 1916, was a tragic page in the history of the region. The opening of the monument became a symbol of respect and memory of those terrible events. Atambayev's actions underscored the importance of historical memory and unity in the face of past injustices, and the decision was seen as a significant step towards national reconciliation and strengthening the identity of the peoples of Central Asia.

=== Abolition of military courts ===
In November 2015, the Ministry of Defense was re-branded as the State Committee for Defense Affairs on Atambayev's orders while transferring authority over the Armed Forces of Kyrgyzstan to the General Staff, with the Chief of the General Staff exercising his/her authority as the paramount leader of the military and the second in command to the president.

In December 2016, Atambayev signed a decree officially abolishing the use of military courts in Kyrgyzstan.

=== Internal parliamentary cooperation ===
With SDPK holding a parliamentary majority, the Jogorku Kenesh became the first—and at that time the only—legislature in Central Asia to receive “Partner for Democracy” status from the Parliamentary Assembly of the Council of Europe (PACE). The certificate was presented in Strasbourg on 24 June 2014; PACE President Anne Brasseur noted the country’s commitment to open, multi-party governance.

=== Prevention of torture ===
During social democrats period in power, parliament unanimously adopted a stand-alone law establishing Central Asia’s first fully independent National Preventive Mechanism (NPM) under the Optional Protocol to the UN Convention against Torture. The NPM’s functions were assigned to the National Center of the Kyrgyz Republic for the Prevention of Torture. According to a verbal note from the Office of the UN High Commissioner for Human Rights, Kyrgyzstan’s NPM was counted among the world’s top ten systems for the prevention of torture.

== Gender quota and secular politics ==
Under the rule of the Social Democrats in Kyrgyzstan, significant steps were taken towards gender equality. The party introduced gender quotas in the parliament and local councils, the aim of which was to eliminate the gender imbalance and actively support women in the political arena. These measures have become the key to creating a more balanced and representative body of power.

In addition, the Social Democrats actively pursued a secular policy, opposing the processes of Islamization in the country, thereby supporting the principle of separation of religion and state.

== 2020 parliamentary elections and protests ==
=== Background and formation ===
According to appeal of the Social Democrats published in 2020, the party "was created back in 2018 under Almazbek Atambayev as a fallback in case the Social Democratic Party of Kyrgyzstan (SDPK) was not allowed to participate in the 2020 parliamentary elections. Atambayev foresaw the whole situation, and, as a wise and far-sighted politician, acted strategically correctly by creating a new platform".

Following the arrest and detention of Atambayev in the pre-trial detention center of the State Committee for National Security of the Kyrgyz Republic, there were speculations that Atambayev's supporters would not be allowed to participate in any elections under the SDKP party-list. Under these conditions, party members registered a "reserved" political organization. Until the spring of 2020, the Social Democrats did not make themselves widely known until 28 May 2020, when the party congress was held, at which Seyidbek Atambayev, the eldest son of Atambayev, was elected chairman of the Social Democrats.

=== Elections of 2020 ===
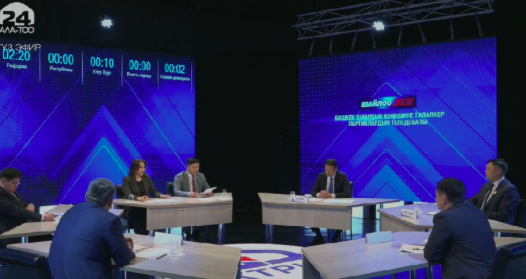
Temirlan Sultanbekov successfully participated in parliamentary debates in 2019, thus gaining electoral popularity

The Social Democrats took part in the October 2020 Kyrgyz parliamentary election, where according to preliminary results, the party failed to overcome the 7% electoral threshold required to enter the Supreme Council as the vast majority of parliamentary seats were won by pro-government parties. On the evening of 4 October 2020, young party leaders of the Social Democrats Aizhan Myrsan, Temirlan Sultanbekov and Kadyrbek Atambaev refused to accept election results as they accused of them being allegedly rigged and instead called on their supporters to attend demonstration in the Ala-Too Square. The following day on 5 October, supporters of the Social Democrats were the first to protest in the square, with them eventually being joined by representatives of other opposition parties later that day who gathered their supporters at the Opera and Ballet Theatre. The number of participants in the protest rally increased, by the evening protesters clashed with the police, which ended with the capture of the White House by the opposition, where the parliament and the presidential apparatus were located. The demonstrators released Atambayev from prison, who had been in custody since the Koi-Tash events of 2019. Eight opposition parties have created a Coordinating Council. The council included the Social Democrats, as well as the Respublika, Ata Meken, Butun Kyrgyzstan, Bir Bol, Zamandash, and Ordo parties. However, the Coordinating Council did not receive real political power.

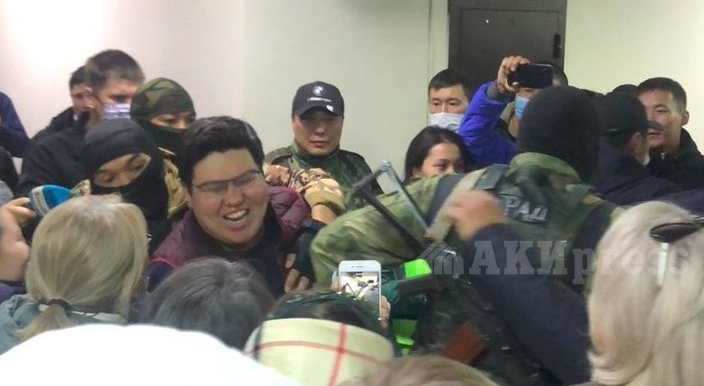
Arrest of Temirlan Sultanbekov during October events

The next day, October 6, the press service of the Social Democrats informed about the unification with members of the SDPK, who "remained faithful to the values of social democracy." The party called the events that took place on the night of 6 October historical in a statement, "Once again, the Kyrgyz people, united by the desire for justice and freedom, overthrew the criminal government." However, on 9 October, a large rally of the Coordinating Council on Ala-Too Square was dispersed by supporters Sadyr Japarov, and on 10 October, Atambayev was detained by special services and brought back to prison. Later, he was released with the help of Spanish Prime-Minister Pedro Sánchez. Subsequently, participation in the 2020 protests became the basis for bringing to justice one of the leaders of the Social Democrats, Temirlan Sultanbekov, since, according to the prosecution, he allegedly organized riots and tried to seize power. Sultanbekov himself denied this completely.

On 12 February 2021, Temirlan Sultanbekov was elected chairman of the party at the congress of the Social Democrats party with the support of Atambayev.

== Representation of the party in government ==
There are 30 cities in Kyrgyzstan, in a number of them elections to city councils were held in the period 2020–2022, the Social Democrats party took part in 11 of them, and was held in seven cities, including in the capital of the Republic. The party is officially represented by factions in city councils in Kant, Shopokov, Orlovka, Kemin, Cholpon-Ata and Bishkek. In the elections on April 10, 2022, the party managed to get its deputies into the city council of Kara-Balta. Seidbek Atambaev won a victory in his constituency in his native Chui region, becoming the representative of the Social Democrats party in the Parliament of the Kyrgyz Republic.

== International connections of the party ==
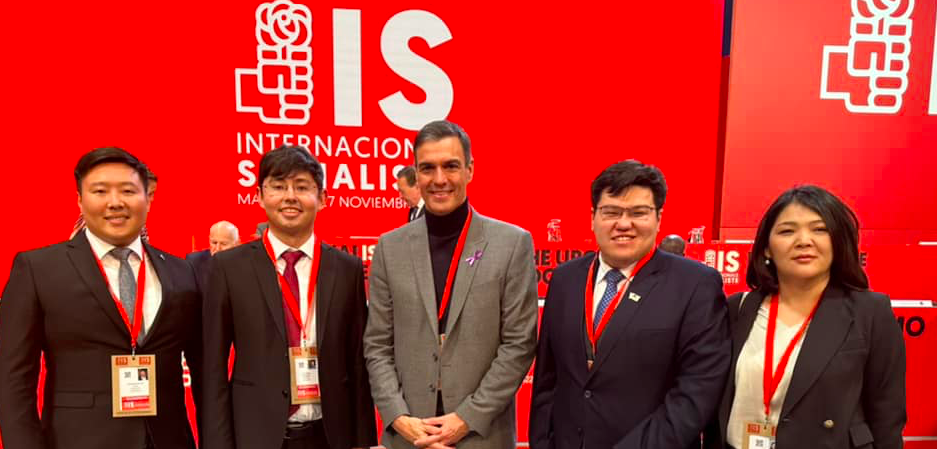
Together with prime-minister of Spain Pedro Sanchez

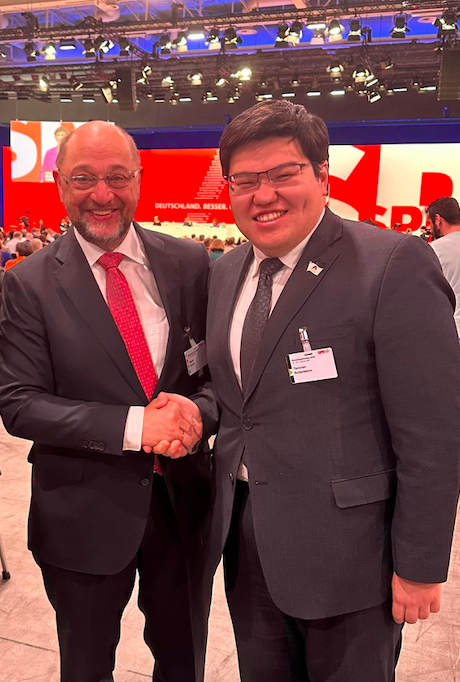
With FES President Martin Schulz

The leadership of the "Social Democrats" maintains close ties with the Socialist International. At his request, in May 2022, the Secretary General of the Socialist International, Luis Ayala, came to Kyrgyzstan, which resulted in the official demand of the Socialist International to the authorities of Kyrgyzstan to send Almazbek Atambayev, still in prison, for a medical examination.

In turn, the chairman of the Social Democrats Temirlan Sultanbekov thanked Ayala for his attention to the fate of the founder of the social democratic movement in the Kyrgyz Republic Almazbek Atambayev and said that it is planned to create a group under the Socialist International that will “observe and respond” to the trials in which they participate as accused representatives of the Social Democrats.

In 2021, the chairman of the party, Temirlan Sultanbekov, was elected as the youngest vice-president in history of the Socialist International, under the presidency of Spanish Prime-minister Pedro Sánchez.

In June 2023, the party joined the Progressive Alliance.

In February 2023, the party became the only political party in the region mentioned in the European Union strategy for Central Asia (in the chapter on EU-Central Asia bilateral relations regarding Kyrgyzstan).
