= Military Courts of Kazakhstan =

Military Courts of the Republic of Kazakhstan (Kazakh: Қазақстан Республикасының әскери соты, romanized: Qazaqstan Respublikasynyñ äskeri soty; Russian: Военного суда Республики Казахстан, romanized: tr, lit. 'Voyennogo suda Respubliki Kazakhstan') are the specialized courts of the Armed Forces of Kazakhstan that deal with criminal cases concerning military personnel and the civilian personnel of the Ministry of Defence. The military courts are part of the judiciary of Kazakhstan. It is often noted as a common criticism that military courts generally have more connection to the government than other courts by virtue of going through the military hierarchy, which has been seen as a threat to judicial independence. Military courts consider civil cases by active servicemen or citizens who undergo military training against their will, among other things.

== History ==
The history of military courts in independent Kazakhstan dates back to 1992, when, by the decree of the Presidium of the Supreme Soviet of Kazakhstan on 20 January 1992, the Soviet Army military tribunals operating in the territory of the Kazakh SSR were transferred to the jurisdiction of the Armed Forces of Kazakhstan. The system of military courts was created by decree of President Nursultan Nazarbayev on 11 June 1992. The same law of 24 June 1992, which is the starting point for the formation of military courts, defined the tasks and powers of the Military Court of the Armed Forces. On 17 April 1992, the Military Collegium of the Supreme Court of Kazakhstan was formed, with Tasmagambetov was appointed as its first chairman. Between 1993 and 1994, military courts of local garrisons were established in regional centers and large cities.

The following people later served as Chairman of the Military Court:

- Major General S. Tasmagambetov (1992–2004)
- A. Toleukhanov (1994–2001)
- Major General S. Tasmagambetov (2002–2007)
- S. Baybatyrov (March 2007–December 2013)
- S. Abdoll (12 December 2013–26 December 2018)
- J. Musabekuli (26 December 2013–Present)

In accordance with the decree of President Nazarbayev, amendments were made to the Constitutional Law on 20 December 1995 began to operate criminal and civil cases in the Military Court. By presidential decree on 15 October 2019, President Kassym-Jomart Tokayev abolished some military courts. Today, 39 judges work in the military courts of the republic.

== See also ==
- Constitution of Kazakhstan
- Military Police (Kazakhstan)
- Military Courts of Kyrgyzstan
- Military Courts of Vietnam
