= Gulbara Kalieva =

Kyrgyzstani lawyer

Gulbara Kalieva is the deputy head of the Supreme Court of Kyrgyzstan.
