= Sultanbekov =

Sultanbekov is a surname. Notable people with the surname include:

- Arslanbek Sultanbekov (born 1965), Russian folk musician and poet
- Temirlan Sultanbekov (born 1996), Kyrgyz politician
