= 2016 in Asia =

This is a list of events in Asia in 2016.

== Incumbents ==
=== Afghanistan ===
(Afghanistan)

=== Armenia ===
(Armenia)

=== Azerbaijan ===
(Azerbaijan)

=== Bahrain ===
(Bahrain)

=== Bangladesh ===
(Bangladesh)

=== Bhutan ===
(Bhutan)

=== Brunei ===
(Brunei)

=== Cambodia ===
(Cambodia)

=== China ===
(China)

=== Cyprus ===
(Cyprus)

=== Georgia ===
(Georgia (country))

=== India ===
(India)

=== Indonesia ===
(Indonesia)

=== Iran ===
(Iran)

=== Iraq ===
(Iraq)

=== Israel ===
(Israel)

=== Japan ===
(Japan)

=== Jordan ===
(Jordan)

=== Kazakhstan ===
(Kazakhstan)

=== Kuwait ===
(Kuwait)

=== Kyrgyzstan ===
(Kyrgyzstan)

=== Laos ===
(Laos)

=== Lebanon ===
(Lebanon)

=== Malaysia ===
(Malaysia)

=== Maldives ===
(Maldives)

=== Mongolia ===
(Mongolia)

=== Myanmar ===
(Myanmar)

=== Nepal ===
(Nepal)

=== North Korea ===
(North Korea)

=== Oman ===
(Oman)

=== Pakistan ===
(Pakistan)

=== Palestine ===
(Palestine)

=== Philippines ===
(Philippines)

=== Qatar ===
(Qatar)

=== Russia ===
(Russia)

=== Saudi Arabia ===
(Saudi Arabia)

=== Singapore ===
(Singapore)

=== South Korea ===
(South Korea)

=== Sri Lanka ===
(Sri Lanka)

=== Syria ===
(Syria)

=== Taiwan ===
(Taiwan)

=== Tajikistan ===
(Tajikistan)

=== Thailand ===
(Thailand)

=== Timor-Leste ===
(Timor-Leste)

=== Turkey ===
(Turkey)

=== Turkmenistan ===
(Turkmenistan)

=== United Arab Emirates ===
(United Arab Emirates)

=== Uzbekistan ===
(Uzbekistan)

=== Vietnam ===
(Vietnam)

=== Yemen ===
(Yemen)

== Events ==
=== January ===
- January 1–2 killed in suicide bombing in Kabul, Afghanistan.
- January 6 - January 2016 North Korean nuclear test
- January 16 - 2016 Taiwanese presidential election

=== February ===
- February 6 - 2016 Taiwan earthquake
- February 17 - an attack in Ankara, Turkey caused at least 28 deaths.
- February 26 - 2016 Iranian legislative election

=== March ===
- March 4 - an attack in Aden caused at least 16 deaths.
- March 13–37 killed in an attack in Ankara.
- March 20
  - 2016 Kazakhstani legislative election
  - 2016 Laotian parliamentary election
- March 31 - an attack in Diyarbakir kills seven police officers

=== April ===
- April 13 - 2016 South Korean legislative election
- April 14 and 16 - 2016 Kumamoto earthquakes
- April 20 - Boungnang Vorachit is elected President of Laos; Thongloun Sisoulith appointed Prime Minister of Laos.

=== May ===
- May 6 - opening of the seventh Congress of the party of labor of Korea.
- May 9 - 2016 Philippine general election
- May 22
  - 2016 Tajikistani constitutional referendum
  - 2016 Vietnamese legislative election
- May 24 - Binali Yıldırım was appointed Prime Minister of Turkey.
- May 26 and 27 - 42nd G7 summit

=== June ===
- June 29 - 2016 Mongolian legislative election

=== July ===
- July 10 - 2016 Japanese House of Councillors election
- July 15 - 2016 Turkish coup d'état attempt
- July 26 - Sagamihara stabbings
- July 31 - Yuriko Koike is the first woman elected Governor of Tokyo.

=== August ===
- August 7 - 2016 Thai constitutional referendum
- August 11 and 12 - bombings in Hua Hin, Surat Thani, Phuket and Trang.
- August 20 - more than 50 killed in a bombing in Gaziantep.
- August 26 - A bombing in Cizre targeted police.
- August 29 - an attack in Aden caused at least 71 dead.

=== September ===
- September 4 - 2016 Hong Kong legislative election
- September 7 and 8 - the 28th ASEAN Summit in Vientiane, Laos.
- September 9 - fifth nuclear test in North Korea.
- September 20 - 2016 Jordanian general election

=== October ===
- October 13 - death of Bhumibol Adulyadejas, King of Thailand, known as the reign of Rama IX.

=== November ===
- November 26 - 2016 Kuwaiti general election

=== December ===
- December 1 - prince Vajiralongkorn is proclaimed King under the name of Rama X.
- December 4 - 2016 Uzbekistani presidential election
- December 11 - 2016 Kyrgyzstani constitutional referendum
- December 17 - a Kayseri attack caused at least 14 deaths.
- December 19 - the Ambassador of Russia Andrei Karlov was assassinated in Ankara.
- December 20 - the Eurasia under the Bosphorus tunnel is opened in Istanbul.

== See also ==
- List of state leaders in 2016 § Asia
