= Temirlan =

Temirlan is a masculine given name. Notable people with the name include:

- Temirlan Sultanbekov (born 1996), Kyrgyz politician
- Temirlan Yerlanov (born 1993), Kazakhstani footballer
- Temirlan Yerzhanov (born 1996), Kazakhstani ice dancer

== See also ==
- Timur (1336–1405), Turco-Mongol conqueror
