= 2016 Kyrgyz constitutional referendum =

- 11 December 2016

Results
Choice	Votes	%
Yes	948,185	83.66%
No	185,140	16.34%
Valid votes	1,133,325	95.18%
Invalid or blank votes	57,427	4.82%
Total votes	1,190,752	100.00%
Registered voters/turnout	2,816,423	42.28%

A constitutional referendum was held in Kyrgyzstan on 11 December 2016. The constitutional amendments were approved by around 80% of voters.

== Background ==
The post-independence constitution was introduced in 1993, with modifications made following referendums in 1996, 1998, 2003, 2007 and 2010. However, the current constitution prohibits any amendments being made until 2020. The original version of the 2010 constitution has been lost.

== Proposed changes ==
The proposed changes to the constitution were put forward by five parties, and included increasing the powers of the Prime Minister and Supreme Council, as well as making reforms to the judicial system. The proposed reforms also established that marriage could be only "between a man and a woman" instead of "between two persons"; this was criticized by the Venice Commission of the Council of Europe.

== Conduct ==
There were some reports of alleged fraud. Some that political parties had resorted to vote buying and people told that they were offered 500 to 1,000 soms ($7 to $14) per vote. Speaking at a press conference, deputy Interior Minister Almaz Orozaliev reported five such cases (three in the Bishkek and two in the northern Chui region).

== Results ==
Choice	Votes	%
For	948,185	83.66
Against	185,140	16.34
Total	1,133,325	100.00
Valid votes	1,133,325	95.18
Invalid/blank votes	57,427	4.82
Total votes	1,190,752	100.00
Registered voters/turnout	2,851,952	41.75
Source: Shailoo
