= 2010 Constitution of Kyrgyzstan =

2010–2021 constitution introducing a parliamentary system

The Constitution of Kyrgyzstan was the supreme law of the Kyrgyz Republic. The constitution in force from 2010 until 2021 was passed by referendum on June 27, 2010, replacing the previous constitution. It introduced a strong parliament to the country, reducing the power of the historically strong president. The constitution is similar in many ways to the previous one.

This constitution was replaced by the current Constitution of Kyrgyzstan in April 2021.

== Passage ==
The referendum passed with 90% of the votes and 70% voter turnout, despite 400,000 people, mostly ethnic Uzbeks, having fled ethnic violence in the south of the country who had still not returned. This replaced the older constitution.

The constitution replaced the old immediately upon publication of the voting results, although according to the document, limited sections do not come into force until later.

Despite fears of illegitimacy due to the recent violence, there were no major reports of violence or fraud during the election. International monitor organizations such as the Organization for Security and Cooperation in Europe approved of the vote. Prior to voting day the government dropped leaflets over Bishkek, urging citizens to remain peaceful and keep the future of their country in mind.

Support for the constitution was strong throughout the country and among all major ethnic groups, despite a relatively low voter turnout in the south of the country and some fears that a parliamentary system would be weaker than a single strong president.

Prior to the drafting of the document, input was received from the Venice Commission, who later said they were pleased with the result.

President Dmitriy Medvedev of Russia stated concerns that it would lead to instability and volatility, giving rise to extremism.

== Impact ==
The constitution legislated a shift in the country's politics away from a presidential system and toward a parliamentary system, reducing the power of the president. The last two presidents of Kyrgyzstan under the old system, Askar Akayev and Kurmanbek Bakiyev, were ousted in revolutions.

Under the new constitution, the president serves a single six-year term and cannot be re-elected. Although the president is weaker in the new system than previously, the presidency is not a figurehead position as in many parliamentary systems. The president has veto power and the ability to appoint heads of state bodies.

The constitution limits any single political party to 65 of the parliament's 120 seats as an unusual way to limit power concentration. In addition, political parties may not be founded on ethnic or religious grounds, and members of the police, armed forces, and judiciary are prohibited from joining parties.

The document gives significant mention to human rights in Kyrgyzstan, particularly section two. It declares men and women to be equal and prohibits discrimination in article 16. The rights of prisoners are outlined in article 20, including a ban on the death penalty and torture.

== Location ==
In 2016, while several amendments to the constitution were being considered for passage, government officials were unable to locate the original document. The office of President Almazbek Atambayev claimed that the Ministry of Justice possessed the constitution, while the Ministry said that the document was being held by the Presidential Administration. The President's office eventually claimed that an original copy of the document had never existed, it was simply reprinted in newspapers when it was passed in 2010.

== Outline ==
The constitution is split into nine sections comprising 114 separate articles. The sections, which are structured similarly to the old constitution are:

1. Foundations of constitutional order
2. The rights and freedoms of man and citizen
3. President of Kyrgyzstan
4. Legislative authority of the Kyrgyz Republic
5. Executive powers of the Kyrgyz Republic
6. Judicial powers of the Kyrgyz Republic
7. Other government agencies
8. Local self-government
9. How to make changes in this constitution

In addition, there is a last section which details the implementation of the constitution, including date of effect, nullification of the previous constitution, and creation of the interim government.
