= 1996 Kyrgyz constitutional referendum =

10 February 1996
- Do you approve the Law of the Kyrgyz Republic "On amendments and additions of the Constitution of the Kyrgyz Republic", a draft which was published in the Decree of the President of the Kyrgyz Republic on 3 January 1996 "On the referendum in the Kyrgyz Republic on 10 February 1996"?

Results
Choice	Votes	%
Yes	2,125,972	98.56%
No	31,085	1.44%
Valid votes	2,157,057	99.04%
Invalid or blank votes	20,934	0.96%
Total votes	2,177,991	100.00%
Registered voters/turnout	2,254,166	96.62%

A constitutional referendum was held in Kyrgyzstan on 10 February 1996. Voters were asked "Do you approve the law of the Kyrgyz Republic "On amendments and additions of the Constitution of the Kyrgyz Republic," a draft which was published in the Decree of the President of the Kyrgyz Republic on 3 January 1996?"

It was approved by 99% of voters, with turnout reported to be 97%.

== Results ==
Choice	Votes	%
For	2,125,972	98.56
Against	31,085	1.44
Total	2,157,057	100.00
Valid votes	2,157,057	99.04
Invalid/blank votes	20,934	0.96
Total votes	2,177,991	100.00
Registered voters/turnout	2,254,166	96.62
Source: Nohlen et al.
