= Supreme Court of Kyrgyzstan =

Highest court of appeal in the legal system of Kyrgyzstan

- Кыргыз Республикасынын; Жогорку Соту (Kyrgyz); Верховный Суд; Кыргызской Республики (Russian)
- Established: 5 May 1993
- Location: 205 Abdumomunov St, Bishkek, Kyrgyzstan
- Authorised by: Kyrgyz Constitution
- Judge term length: Mandatory retirement by age of 70
- Number of positions: 35

Chairman of the Supreme Court
- Currently: Mederbek Satyev
- Since: 24 October 2024; 2 years ago

The Supreme Court of Kyrgyzstan (Kyrgyz: Кыргыз Республикасынын Жогорку Соту) is the highest court in the judicial system of Kyrgyzstan and is the country's court of final appeal. Headquartered in the capital city, Bishkek, the court holds ultimate jurisdiction over civil, criminal, economic, and administrative legal proceedings in the country. It also exercises judicial supervision over the operations of the local and regional courts.

== History ==
Following Kyrgyzstan's independence from the Soviet Union in 1991, the country adopted a new constitution on 5 May 1993, a date subsequently celebrated annually as Constitution Day. The constitution established the roles and responsibilities of the Supreme Court. The Soviet era judicial framework formally abolished on 24 April 1999 with the repeal of the Law "On the Judicial System of the Kirgiz SSR" which had been enacted previously on 11 April 1990.

Until 2010, constitutional review in Kyrgyzstan was exercised by a separate Constitutional Court. Following its abolition during the 2010 Kyrgyz Revolution and the subsequent adoption of a new constitution, responsibility for constitutional review was transferred to the Supreme Court through the Constitutional Chamber of the Supreme Court. Between 2010 and 2021, the chamber was responsible for determining the constitutionality of laws. This arrangement ended following the 2021 Kyrgyz government system referendum, after which the Constitutional Court was reestablished as a separate judicial body.

== Structure and appointment ==
The Supreme Court is composed of 35 judges, including a chairman and three deputy chairmen. The court is organised into specialised judicial collegiums (benches) which hear cases in specific areas of the law, including criminal, civil, and administrative and economic cases.

Judges of the Supreme Court are nominated by the President of Kyrgyzstan on the recommendation of the Council on Justice Affairs, and are appointed following approval by the Jogorku Kenesh. In addition, the chairman and deputy chairmen are appointed for five years terms. Supreme Court judges must be at least 40 years of age, and are subject to a mandatory retirement age of 70. Candidates must also have at least 15 years of legal experience, including at least 5 years of experience as a judge.

== Controversies ==
While the Constitution of Kyrgyzstan guarantees judicial independence, the Supreme Court has faced scrutiny over allegations of political interference. In 2018, the Supreme Court began publishing records of alleged extrajudicial pressure and interference as part of efforts to increase transparency. In 2024, however, the court again faced criticism over its ruling that upheld the liquidation of the independent news outlet Kloop Media.

== See also ==
- Judiciary of Kyrgyzstan
