= Constitutional Chamber of the Supreme Court of Kyrgyzstan =

- Кыргыз Республикасынын Жогорку сотунун Конституциялык Палатасы
- Established: 2010; acts since 2013
- Jurisdiction: Kyrgyzstan
- Location: Erkindik Avenue 39, Bishkek
- Composition method: Presidential, Parliamentary and Council on Selection of Judges nomination
- Authorised by: Kyrgyz Constitution
- Judge term length: 7
- Number of positions: 11
- Website: Official website

Chairman of the Constitutional Chamber of the Supreme Court
- Currently: Karybek Duisheev
- Since: 1 July 2019

The Constitutional Chamber of the Supreme Court of the Kyrgyz Republic (Kyrgyz: Кыргыз Республикасынын Жогорку сотунун Конституциялык Палатасы) is Kyrgyzstan's highest judicial authority which independently performs the constitutional oversight of legislation.

== History ==
The Constitutional Chamber of the Supreme Court was established with the new Constitution after the 2010 Kyrgyz Revolution. The original Constitutional Court was abolished after the unrest by the Provisional Government, since it was seen as a body "contributing to the strengthening the power of an individual person"

== Composition ==
The chamber consists of 11 judges. The judges are appointed with the advice of the Council of Judges' Selection, approval by the President, and a vote by the Parliament. There are 10 judges at work currently. The Chairman of the Chamber is Erkinbek Mamyrov.
