= Council for the Selection of Judges =

Committee in Kyrgyzstan

The Council for the Selection of Judges is a body in Kyrgyzstan responsible for the appointment of judges. The Organization for Security and Co-operation in Europe have argued that the Council suffers from excessive politization and reform is needed to guarantee the independence of the Kyrgyz judiciary.

== See also ==
- Prosecutor General's Office of Kyrgyzstan
- Judiciary Reform Commission (Kyrgyzstan)
- National Council for Judicial Affairs (Kyrgyzstan)
