= Rita Karasartova =

Kyrgyzstani human rights activist

- Рита Карасартова
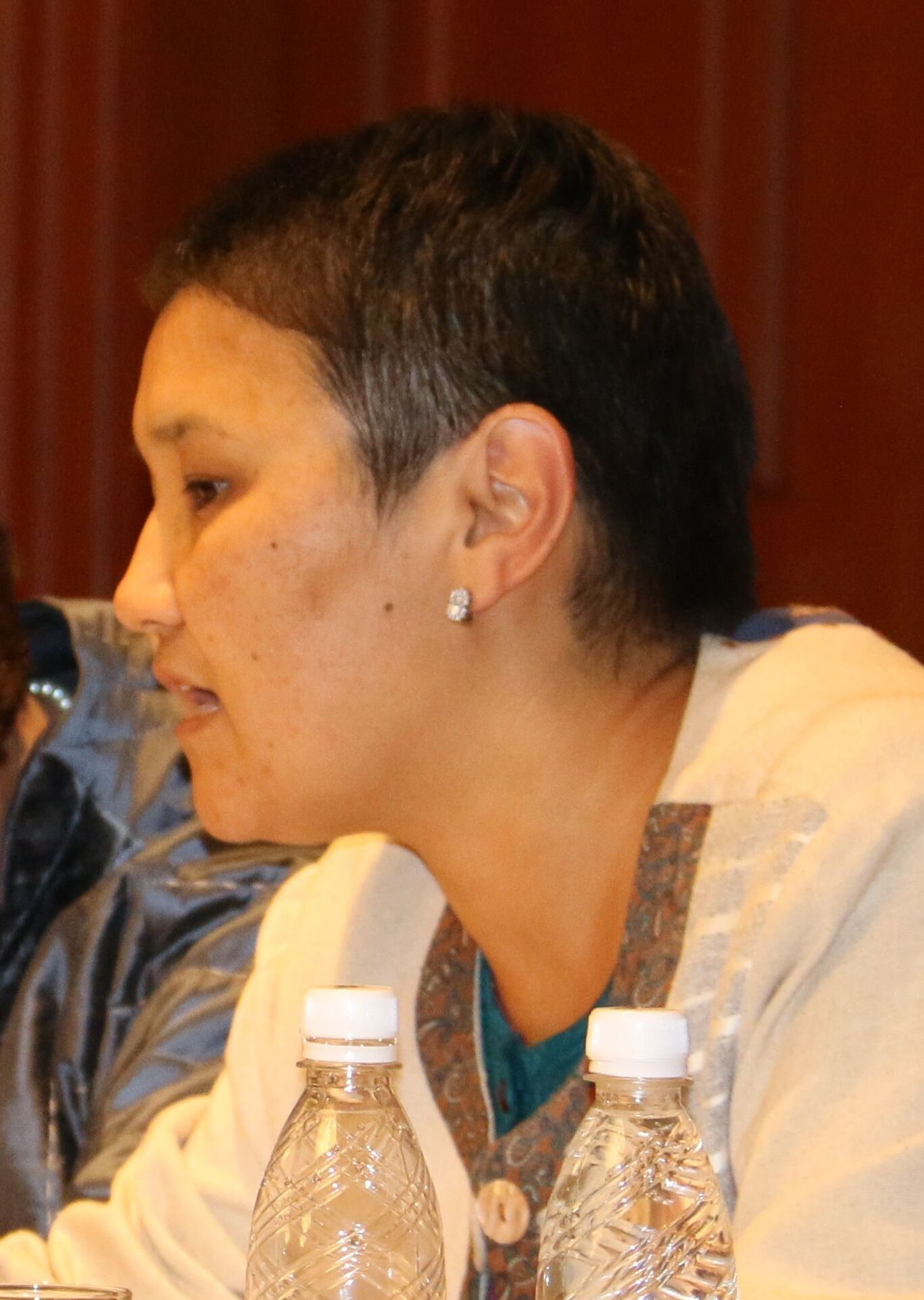
- Karasartova addressing the parliamentary observers in Bishkek, 2017
- Born: c. 1970 (age 55–56)
- Occupations: Lawyer; activist

Rita Rahman kyzy Karasartova (Kyrgyz: Рита Рахман кызы Карасартова; born c. 1970) is a Kyrgyz human rights activist known for her work on civil engagement in Kyrgyzstan.

== Biography ==
Karasartova is the head of the Institute for Public Analysis, a non-governmental organisation that monitors selection and rotation within the Kyrgyzstani judiciary system. In addition, she also provides pro bono legal support to citizens of Kyrgyzstan seeking to address alleged injustices committed by law enforcement and the judiciary.

Amnesty International described Karasartova as an expert in civil governance, while Front Line Defenders called her one of the first female human rights activists to publicly cover issues in the Kyrgyz language.

Karasartova is a member of the United People's Movement.

=== 2022 Kempir-Abad case ===
On 23 October 2022, Karasartova was one of several activists, journalists and politicians who were arrested after publicly opposing the proposed transfer of the Kempir-Abad Reservoir from Kyrgyzstan to Uzbekistan. Karasartova was detained for a period of months before being placed under house arrest.

On 14 June 2024, Karasartova and the other defendants were acquitted following a classified trial at a court in Bishkek. The prosecution subsequently announced its decision to appeal the decision in September 2024.

=== 2025 arrest and imprisonment ===
On 14 April 2025, Karasartova posted a letter on Facebook written by Tilekmat Kurenov, a Kyrgyzstani opposition activist. Kurenov had previously travelled to Dubai in order to meet with a former Kyrgyzstani politician, and had asked Karasartova to post the letter if something happened to him. Karasartova decided to post the letter publicly after not hearing from Kurenov since early April, causing her to be concerned he had been forcibly disappeared; on 9 April, the State Committee for National Security had alleged that it had uncovered a plot to seize power from the Kyrgyzstani government, and stated that one of the plot's leaders was in the United Arab Emirates.

Later that day, armed police officers from the Main Department of Internal Affairs of Chüy Region raised Karasartova's home in Bishkek, initially transporting and interrogating her at a police station in Chüy. In the days prior to her arrest, two other activists had been arrested on suspicion of being "supporters of Kurenov" and following Karasartova's arrest, local media reported that she had "close ties" to the main suspects concerning a plot to overthrow the government.

On 19 April, Kyrgyzstani authorities confirmed that Kurenov was in their custody, having been deported from the United Arab Emirates, and stated that he had been charged with calling for and preparing mass riots and attempting to seize power. The prosecution alleged that Karasartova's posting of Kurenov's letter was a signal to start an attempt coup d'état.

On 17 April, Karasartova's detention was extended until 12 May, at a hearing held at 02:00 KGT; while the judge recognised that the circumstances of her arrest had contained "procedural violations", Karasartova's detention was deemed to be "justified". The hearing was held in Russian, and Karasartova was not provided access to a Kyrgyz interpreter.

At a subsequent hearing on 30 May at Sverdlovsky District Court in Bishkek, Karasartova's detention was further extended until at least 12 June. She was being held at Pre-Trial Detention Centre #1 of the City of Bishkek.

On 8 July 2025, Karasartova was formally charged with organising mass riots, under article 278 of the Kyrgyzstani criminal code, and calling for the violent seizure of power, under article 327.

After two postponements, Karasartova's trial started on 15 August 2025. Kyrgyzstani authorities classified the case, preventing the defence from obtaining its own copy of the evidence file against Karasartova. On 18 September, she was sentenced to five years' probation, in addition to a fine of 50, 000 KGS.

Karasartova appealed her sentence; in December 2025, her sentence was upheld.

On 20 February 2026, Karasartova filed a lawsuit against the leadership of the State Penitentiary Service and the SIZO-1 pre-trial detention centre, accusing them of ignoring her legal right to a 15-minute telephone call with family members once a week.

== Recognition ==
Human Rights Watch stated that the authorities' decision to classify Karasartova's case violated her right to a fair trial, as it shielded proceedings from public scrutiny, describing it as a "politically motivated persecution". It called for the trial to be halted, the charges dropped, and Karasartova released. Amnesty International featured Karasartova in its 2023 Write for Rights campaign. Front Line Defenders called for Karasartova's immediate and unconditional release.
