= Temirlan Sultanbekov =

Kyrgyz politician (born 1998)

- Темирлан Султанбеков
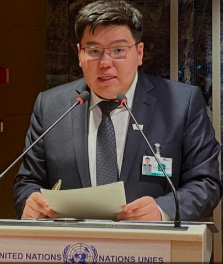
- Sultanbekov in 2021

Vice-President of Socialist International
- Incumbent
- Assumed office 25 November 2022
- President: Pedro Sánchez
- Secretary General: Chantal Kambiwa

Chairman of the Social Democrats
- Incumbent
- Assumed office 12 February 2021
- Preceded by: Seyidbek Atambayev

Personal details
- Born: 12 September 1998 (age 28) Balykchy, Issyk-Kul Region, Kyrgyzstan
- Party: Social Democrats (2016–present)
- Education: HSE University
- Website: www.sdk.kg

Temirlan Medetbekovich Sultanbekov (born 12 September 1998) is a Kyrgyz politician. He is the leader of the Social Democrats of Kyrgyzstan. He is the youngest vice president of the Socialist International (SI) and a member of the Board of Progressive Alliance. He won the José Francisco Peña Gómez SI award. Sultanbekov, barred from the Bishkek City Council elections, became the first person from Central Asia whose name appeared in the title of a European Parliament resolution.

== Early life ==
Sultanbekov was born on 12 September 1998, in a military family in the town of Balykchy, Issyk-Kul Region, in Eastern Kyrgyzstan.

His father, Medetbek Sultanbekov, is a colonel, ex-chief of the main directorate of the General Staff of the Armed Forces of the Kyrgyz Republic, studied in Russia and Germany, and is a co-author with European researchers of a number of books. In September 2019, due to Sultanbekov's active political activities, he was forced to resign from the Ministry of Defense. Currently working in the Central Asian representative office of ITF-Enhancing Human Security.

His mother, Kyyal Toktorbaev, is a retired officer of the border troops of the Kyrgyz Republic.

=== Childhood and youth ===
He attended school-gymnasium No. 1 named after Leo Tolstoy. He continued his studies at the National Research University of the Higher School of Economics in Moscow at the Faculty of World Economy and World Politics, and also has a two-year minor in law, in parallel with the main course in international relations.

Completed training at the anti-corruption policy summer school in July 2018, organized by Transparency International.

In October 2019, he completed democracy training for young leaders in Georgia, organized under a project of the European Union.

Sultanbekov is a member of Club De Madrid WYDE Network, a program funded by European Union and European Partnership for Democracy.

== Early political activity ==
Sultanbekov has been a member of the party since coming of age on 12 September 2016.

In 2016, he became the youngest advisor to the ruling Social democratic faction in the National Parliament - Jogorku Kenesh of the Kyrgyz Republic in the history of parliament.

On 6 April 2018, at the party congress, he was elected a member of the political council and joined the presidium of the political council.

From 2018 to 2019, he was the official representative of the Social

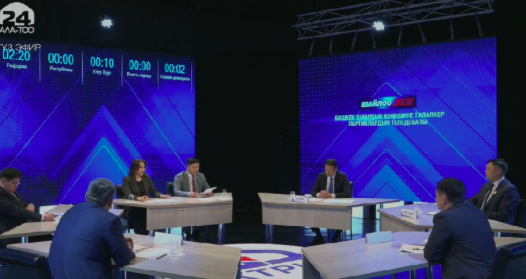
Temirlan Sultanbekov successfully participated in parliamentary debates in 2019, thus gaining electoral popularity

Democrats of Kyrgyzstan in the Russian Federation. He accompanied ex-president Almazbek Atambayev on his visit to Moscow.

In May 2020, he was elected deputy chairman of the party.

In February 2021, at the proposal of ex-president A. Atambayev, the party congress elected Sultanbekov as the new chairman of the party.

Sultanbekov won televised debates during the elections of October 2020 in Kyrgyzstan.

== Confrontation with Sooronbay Jeenbekov, arrest, prison and revolution ==
In the presidential elections of 2017, Sultanbekov actively supported Sooronbay Jeenbekov as a presidential candidate from the SDPK. After an internal party split, he supported ex-president Almazbek Atambaev, and also accused President Sooronbay Jeenbekov of organizing a family-clan regime and deviating from the path of sustainable, democratic development of Kyrgyzstan.

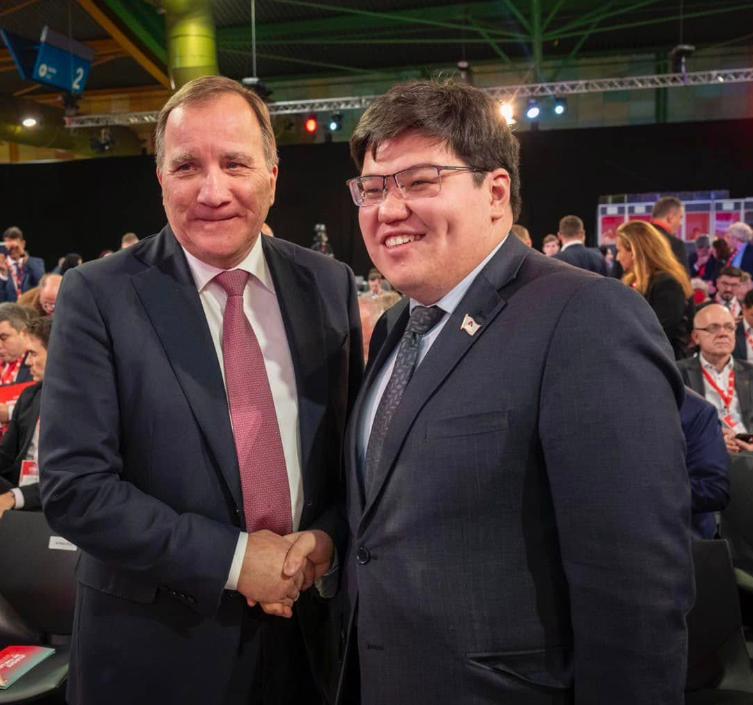
President of the Party of European Socialists Stefan Löfven and Temirlan Sultanbekov

At the end of October 2019, Sultanbekov demanded that a criminal case be opened against Asylbek Jeenbekov, the president's brother, and that he be arrested for participation in corruption schemes, negligence and abuse of office. On 2 November 2019, President Jeenbekov met with the heads of leading media outlets in Kyrgyzstan, where he stated: “Here Sultanbekov says: “Decide who you are with - your relatives or the people.” I decided a long time ago. I'm with the people. What do they want? So that I can protect a bunch of corrupt officials? It will not happen. I made a choice a long time ago: I am with the people! “I spoke out, and things became easier,” concluded the head of state. Sultanbekov responded on 11 November 2019 by stating that he would continue to seek the arrest of Asylbek Jeenbekov.

In the parliamentary elections of 2020, he refused the proposals of the authorities and pro-government parties and was a candidate for deputy in the top ten from the political party Social Democrats.

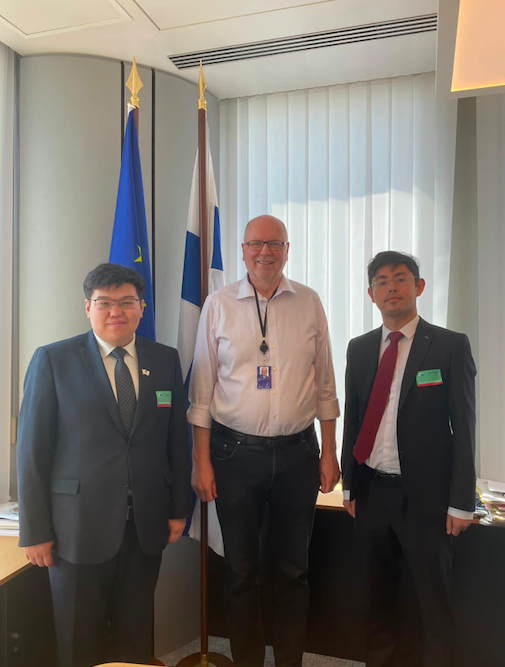
With S&D group treasurer Eero Heinaluoma

On 10 October 2020, after the revolution in Kyrgyzstan, he was detained by law enforcement agencies for organizing mass riots and attempting a coup. On 13 October, the Pervomaisky District Court of Bishkek decided to take Sultanbekov into custody for two months with the right to indefinitely extend the period of detention. The following spoke in support of Sultanbekov: General Secretary of the Socialist International Luis Ayala, Political Party “A Just Russia”, Prime Minister of Kyrgyzstan Sadyr Japarov, politicians Omurbek Babanov, Zhanar Akaev, Irina Karamushkina, Mirlan Zheenchoroev, Almambet Shykmamatov, Altynai Omurbekova, Dastan Bekeshev, Adahan Madumarov, Urmat Dzhanybaev, Klara Sooronkulova and others. Public figures and cultural figures also spoke in support of Sultanbekov: Syimyk Beyshekeev, Mirbek Atabekov, Nazira Aitbekova, Syezbek Iskenaliev, Kairat Primberdiev, Assol Moldokmatova and others.

Within 24 hours Sultanbekov was released by decision of the Bishkek City Court.

In the evening of 14 October 2020, Sultanbekov met with Sadyr Zhaparov and supported him "in order to expel Jeenbekov" The next day, President Sooronbai Jeenbekov resigned.

On 31 May 2021, Asylbek Jeenbekov was detained by law enforcement agencies of Kyrgyzstan on suspicion of corruption.

On 1 June 2021, Sultanbekov stated the following:

“All these last three years, I knew that this would happen, I turned to Sooronbai Jeenbekov with statements to help them. But one day he publicly said about me at a press conference that I was telling lies. that his relatives are interfering in power. Now many journalists are calling me, asking for comment. I want to say only one thing: everything that I think about this and about them, I said at one time. Now it would be wrong if I to criticize, it will be biased, because they - the then president, his brother, his staff and a number of other deputies - fought with me, with some 19-year-old boy, fired my parents and other relatives from work, summoned me for interrogation, organized intimidation actions, They mocked and eventually imprisoned them and threatened to torture them. Two years have passed, and now there is no one around them. Where are the brave deputies, the government, the security forces? The main thing is to remain human, the main thing is to always be human!"

== Criminal case on the October events 2020 ==
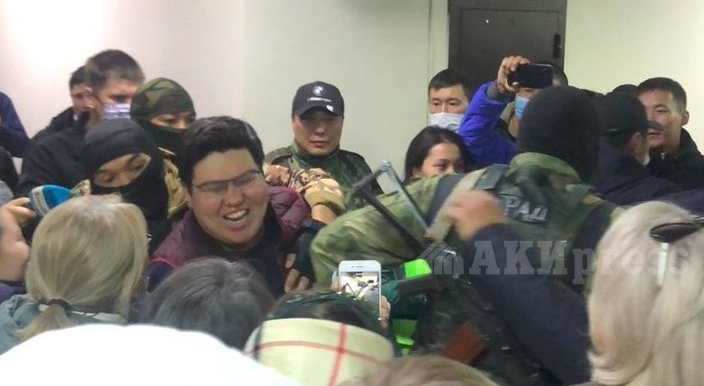
Arrest of Temirlan Sultanbekov during October events

On 5–6 October 2020, mass rallies of many thousands took place in Kyrgyzstan with the capture of the White House, the State Committee for National Security, the Prosecutor's Office, Parliament and the Ministry of Internal Affairs. One of the leaders of the protests was Sultanbekov. On October 9, Sultanbekov was detained by law enforcement agencies for organizing mass riots and attempting a coup. On 13 October the Pervomaisky District Court of Bishkek decided to take Sultanbekov into custody for two months with the right to indefinitely extend the period of detention. As a result of great public support, within 24 hours Sultanbekov was released by decision of the Bishkek City Court; on 14 October his preventive measure was changed from arrest in a pre-trial detention center to house arrest. The next day, Jeenbekov was forced to resign as president as a result of popular unrest.

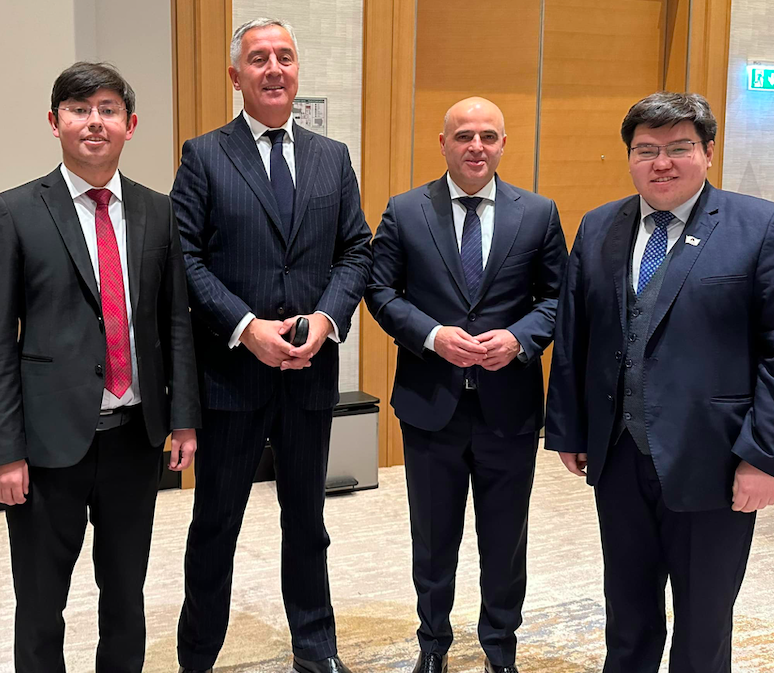
With prime-ministers of Balcan states

On 28 June 2022, in the Pervomaisky District Court of Bishkek, the prosecutor asked to sentence Sultanbekov to nine years in prison to serve the sentence in a general regime colony.

After leaving the deliberation room, Judge Ubaydulla Satimkulov read out the verdict, according to which Sultanbekov was acquitted for lack of evidence of a crime.

== Constitutional reform and restriction of rights ==
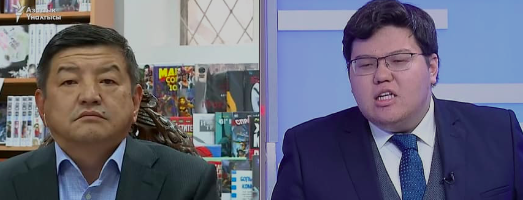
Debates with prime-minister of Kyrgyzstan Akylbek Japarov on Radio Liberty

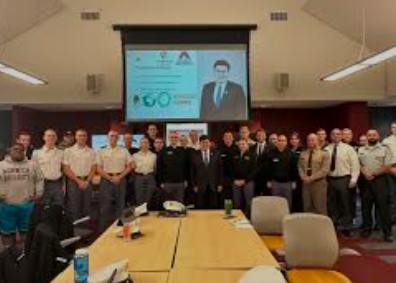
Lecture in Norwich University (US) by Temirlam Sultanbekov

Raising the age threshold for deputies of the Jogorku Kenesh of Kyrgyzstan from 21 to 25 years is associated with the conflict between Sultanbekov and Akylbek Japarov. At that time, Sultanbekov was 22 years old. On 23 October 2020, Sultanbekov, during a debate with presidential adviser Akylbek Japarov, accused him of corruption and demanded that the money be returned to the state budget. Akylbek Japarov spoke impartially to Sultanbekov. On 26 October 2020, Sultanbekov announced that he refused to be part of the government. According to him, the current government does not have a clear strategy, plans and will to implement major reforms in Kyrgyzstan. According to Sultanbekov, Sadyr Japarov is "already under the influence of a number of people, and today the state is plunging into chaos, lawlessness, dictatorship, corrupt people come to power, the country's Constitution is not respected.” On 27 October 2020, the President of the Kyrgyz Republic Sadyr Japarov said in a video interview that he fired Akylbek Japarov from the post of adviser to the head of state because he spoke impartially to Sultanbekov. During the adoption of the new Constitution, Akylbek Japarov proposed an amendment to raise the age threshold for deputies of the Jogorku Kenesh from 21 to 25 years, in order not to let Sultanbekov into parliament. The Constitutional Conference rejected Akylbek Japarov's proposal unanimously. However, in the final text of the new Constitution a clause appeared on raising the threshold age for deputies from 21 to 25 years. Sultanbekov said in an interview with the media that he spoke with the authorities and tried to negotiate about the inadmissibility of depriving him of the opportunity to participate in the elections, but the negotiations did not lead to success. Sultanbekov called Akylbek Japarov a corrupt official and began to demand compensation for financial costs to the state. As a result, as part of a tax evasion case, Akylbek Japarov’s wife paid 28 million soms to the state. Sultanbekov called this the first victory, but noted that this was not enough.

In 2022, during a panel discussion, Uzar Zhylkybaev, Deputy Chairman of the Central Election Commission of the Kyrgyz Republic, admitted and emphasized that raising the age limit to 25 years for parliamentarians was adopted in order to prevent Sultanbekov from entering parliament. During the adoption of the new Constitution, Akylbek Zhaparov proposed to amend the age limit for deputies of the JK KR from 21 to 25 years old, Sultanbekov was 22 years old.

== Chairman of SDK ==
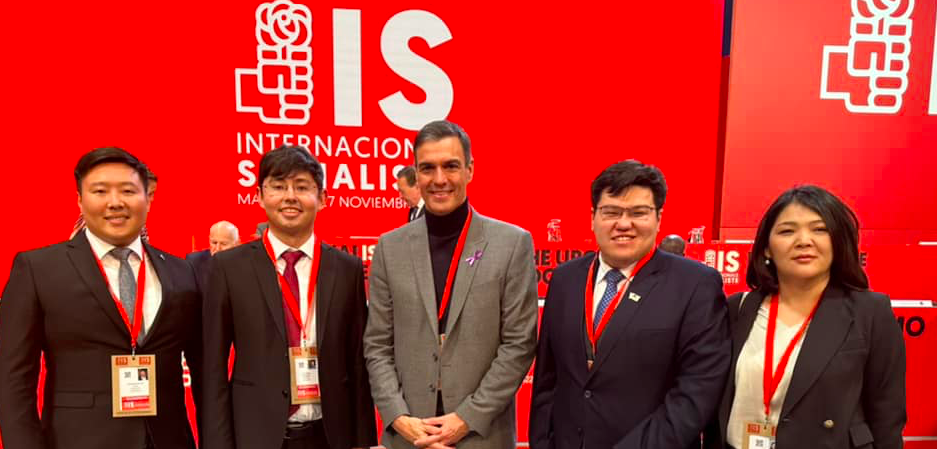
Together with prime-minister of Spain Pedro Sanchez

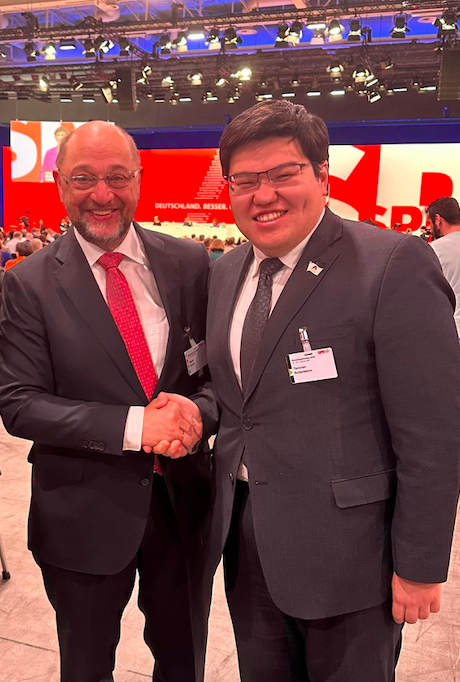
With FES President Martin Schulz

On 12 February 2021, Sultanbekov was elected chairman at the 4th Social Democrats Congress party with the support of ex-president Almazbek Atambayev. In the elections of city councils of deputies under the leadership of Sultanbekov, the party passed in a number of cities: Kant (7%), Orlovka (20%), Kemin (8.8%), Shopokov (10%), Kara-Balta (14.5%), Cholpon-Ata (18.7%). The elections in the capital were the most competitive; as a result, the Social Democrats party received 5.4% and did not enter the Bishkek City Council of Deputies. However, the Social Democrats began to hold mass rallies with slogans about the lack of transparency of the elections, bribery of voters and falsification of the results. As a result, for the first time in the history of Kyrgyzstan, the results of the elections to the capital's parliament were canceled. In the second elections 2 months later, the Social Democrats party received 9% of the votes and entered the Bishkek City Council of Deputies. The media of Kyrgyzstan called the victory of the Social Democrats triumphant.

Based on the results of 2022, the Bishkek City Council of Deputies awarded Sultanbekov a silver badge of distinction. Under the leadership of Sultanbekov, legally independent, but affiliated with the party, youth, women's and environmental organizations were created. They became full members of international organizations. After the outbreak of the Russian-Ukrainian war, the Social Democrats party interrupted the long-standing traditional foreign policy of Eurasianism and international inter-party cooperation only within the CIS and Asia.

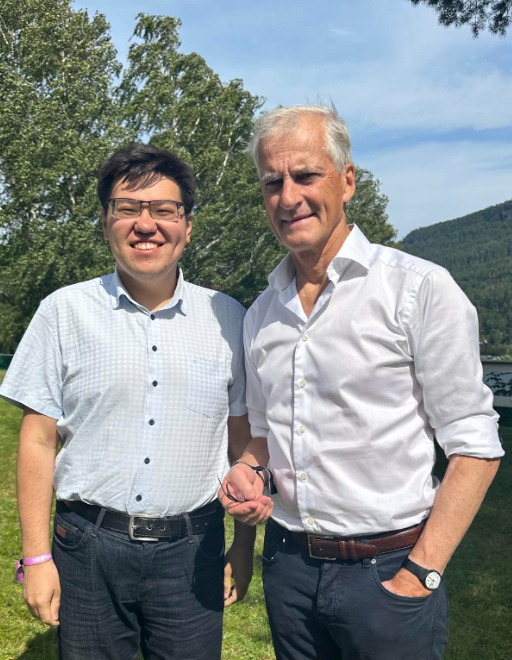
Prime-minister of Norway Jonas Gahr Støre and Temirlan Sultanbekov

Thus, the Social Democrats party began active interaction with political parties in Europe, with the Progressive Alliance of Socialists and Democrats faction of the European Parliament.

The Social Democrats party was elected to the presidium of the Socialist International, Sultanbekov at the congress in November 2022 in Madrid was elected vice-president of the Socialist International, and the head of the Spanish government, leader of the Spanish Workers' Socialist Party Pedro Sánchez, President of the Socialist International.

In June 2023, the youth organization of the party at the IUSY congress in Panama became member of the organization.

In July 2023, at a meeting of the Political Council of the Progressive Alliance in Brussels, it was decided to include the Social Democrats of Kyrgyzstan party in the organization as a full member.

== Human rights activism ==
Since 2022, as party leader, Sultanbekov has spoken about politically motivated prosecutions and restrictions on free expression. During the Kyrgyzstan–Tajikistan border hostilities in October 2022, he urged the authorities to protect — rather than target — bloggers and independent outlets reporting on the clashes. He later criticised the handling of the “Kempir-Abad” mass-arrest case and called for the defendants’ acquittal. In the same period, he also commented on cases seen as tests of free expression, including the conviction of akyn (poet-musician) Askat Zhetigen in 2024 and prosecutions affecting Kloop Media staff and reporters with the Temirov Live project, which drew condemnation from international rights groups.

== Secretary General of the April 7 Revolution Association ==
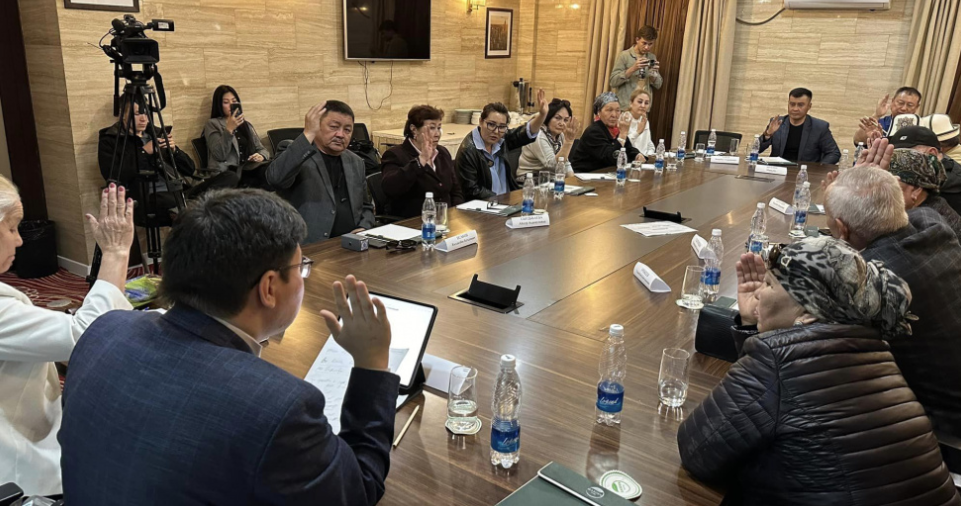
General Secretary Temirlan Sultanbekov and 7th April association

On 23 April 2024, Temirlan Sultanbekov helped unite most civic groups formed by participants of the April 2010 uprising into a single umbrella body — the Association of Organizations of the April People's Revolution — and was appointed its secretary-general.As secretary-general, he has led initiatives to safeguard the memory of 7 April and the pro-democracy legacy often linked to Kyrgyzstan's reputation as an “island of democracy.”

Temirlan Sultanbekov also opposed the visit and rehabilitation of former President Kurmanbek Bakiyev, a former protégé of the current leadership and a business partner of Lukashenko's who is responsible for dozens of political assassinations in Kyrgyzstan and the shooting of peaceful protesters on April 7, 2010. Bakiyev wanted to build a factory in the country to produce military uniforms for Belarus. The Association of Organizations of the April People's Revolution, which Sultanbekov leads, strongly opposed Bakiyev's return to the country. Temirlan Sultanbekov stated that President Sadyr Japarov is deceiving the public by claiming the people's consent to his return.

== Repression during the November 2024 elections ==
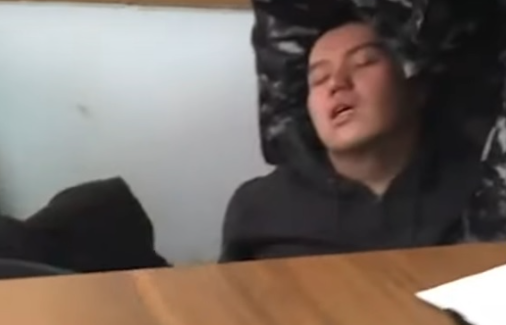
Temirlan Sultanbekov lost consciousness during his hunger strike, but was not hospitalized.

Earlier and throughout 2023–2025, Sultanbekov highlighted alleged nepotism and elite-linked real-estate schemes and related developments in Bishkek identified links to relatives and associates of SCNS chief Tashiev and President Sadyr Japarov, a characterization Japarov later addressed. Temirlan Sultanbekov openly criticized the construction company "Elizaveta" for seizing land in Bishkek, where journalists discovered President Sadyr Japarov's family stake. Temirlan Sultanbekov also spoke out against a relative of the head of the State Committee for National Security, Zhana Kuch, who headed the party on the eve of the elections in Bishkek.

On 13–15 November 2024, days before the 17 November municipal elections, police searched the Social Democrats’ headquarters and detained Sultanbekov and party members on vote-buying allegations; the party was removed from the race. The authorities also used threats and blackmail against families to disqualify all Social Democratic candidates from the elections in the city of Uzgen, the second largest city in the south of the country. After being removed from the elections, the party's social media page was hacked and seized.

In December 2024, the head of the State Committee for National Security (SCNS) Kamchybek Tashiev personally criticized Sultanbekov in parliament, calling him “young” and saying he should “first grow there to the level of running the state”.

== Resolution of the European Parliament ==
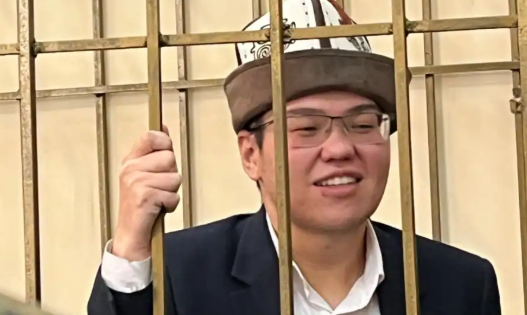
Temirlan Sultanbekov behind bars

In December 2024, the European Parliament adopted an extraordinary resolution on the case of the Social Democrats and the party leader Temirlan Sultanbekov, who was removed from the elections to the Bishkek City Council, which became the first resolution to directly mention a person's name in its title in Central Asia. The party was illegally removed from local elections in the north and south of the country.

Temirlan Sultanbekov was recognized by the Socialist International as a political prisoner and received the Socialist International award for his work in the field of human rights, along with Paris Mayor Anne Hidalgo and Belarusian opposition leader Mikalai Statkevich.
