= 2007 Kyrgyz constitutional referendum =

A constitutional referendum was held in Kyrgyzstan on 21 October 2007, following the constitutional crisis caused by amendments passed since the Tulip Revolution in 2005 (in November and December 2006) being invalidated by the Constitutional Court of Kyrgyzstan on 14 September 2007. Voters were asked whether questions on a new constitution and electoral law. Both were approved by over 95% of voters.

== Background ==
In response to the invalidation of the constitutional amendments passed after the Tulip Revolution, President Kurmanbek Bakiyev called the referendum on 19 September 2007. The new constitution provided for a 90-seat Supreme Council (an increase from 75) elected by proportional representation, whilst members of political parties declared illegal would lose their seats. The president would have powers to appoint or dismiss the government, civil servants, the National Security Council, judges, prosecutors, directors of the National Bank and members of the Electoral Commission, but not to dissolve the Supreme Council. The new electoral law would set a 5% nationwide electoral threshold for political parties, set a gender quota of 30% and require that at least 15% of candidates were under the age of 35 and 15% were from national minorities. The changes were thought likely to see many of the independent politicians and smaller parties eliminated from the Supreme Council.

== Conduct ==
According to observers from the Organization for Security and Co-operation in Europe (OSCE), there were reports of numerous irregularities, observers being obstructed, and ballot stuffing; it also said that popular awareness of what was at stake in the referendum was low and called into question the claimed high turnout rate. The United States embassy also had concerns and said that the vote fell short of international standards.

== Results ==
=== Constitution ===
Do you agree with the new version of the constitution?

Choice	Votes	%
For	2,078,748	95.44
Against	99,336	4.56
Total	2,178,084	100.00
Valid votes	2,178,084	98.96
Invalid/blank votes	22,950	1.04
Total votes	2,201,034	100.00
Registered voters/turnout		80.64
Source: Direct Democracy

=== Electoral law ===
Do you agree with the new electoral law, as proposed by the President for the referendum?

Choice	Votes	%
For	2,077,030	95.36
Against	100,978	4.64
Total	2,178,008	100.00
Valid votes	2,178,008	98.97
Invalid/blank votes	22,577	1.03
Total votes	2,200,585	100.00
Registered voters/turnout		80.64
Source: Direct Democracy

== Aftermath ==
Analysts assumed that there would be early parliamentary elections in 2008 following the referendum, especially as Bakiyev had also announced that he would be founding a political party. Bakiyev called early elections for December 2007 immediately after preliminary results indicated that more than 75% of voters had approved the changes, with an official turnout of 80%.
