= Constitutional Court of Kyrgyzstan =

The Constitutional Court of Kyrgyzstan (Kyrgyz: Кыргыз Республикасынын Конституциялык соту, romanized: Kyrgyz Respublikasynyn Konstitutsiyalyk sotu) is the highest court of Kyrgyzstan's legal system. It judges on the constitutionality of laws and is composed of nine judges.

== History ==
In 1989, a law was passed establishing the Constitutional Oversight Committee of the Kyrgyz Republic. In 1990, the COC was abolished, a law was passed establishing the Constitutional Court of the Kyrgyz Republic. The laws on its activities was adopted in 1993. Critics argued that its politically charged judgement such as allowing President Akayev to re-run for President despite the Presidency being limited by term limits are evidence of a lack of judicial independence.

The Constitutional Court was abolished on 7 April 2010 with the adoption of the new Constitution and its powers transferred to the Constitutional Chamber of the Supreme Court on June 27, 2010. In 2021, however, the Constitutional Court was re-established as a result of a new version of the Constitution.

== Chairmen ==
- Cholpon Baekova (1993-2007)
- Svetlana Sydykova (2008—2010)
- Mukambet Kasymaliev (2013-2016)
- Erkinbek Mamyrov (2016-2019)
- Karybek Duysheev (2019-2022)
- Emil Oskonbaev (2022–present)

== See also ==
- Courts of Kyrgyzstan
