= Military Courts of Kyrgyzstan =

Military court of Kyrgyzstan

- Кыргыз Республикасынын; Аскердик Соттор (Kyrgyz); Военные Суды; Кыргызской Республики (Russian)
- Dissolved: 27 December 2016
- Location: Kyrgyzstan
- Judge term length: 10 years
- Number of positions: 14

Chairman of the Military Courts
- Currently: Defunct; Nurlanbek Ashymbekov (last)

The Military Courts of Kyrgyzstan (Kyrgyz: Кыргыз Республикасынын Аскердик Соттор; Russian: Военные Суды Кыргызской Республики) were specialised courts within the judicial system of Kyrgyzstan that exercised jurisdiction over criminal cases involving military personnel. The courts were primarily based in military garrisons and heard cases concerning offenses committed by servicemen. On 27 December 2016, President Almazbek Atambayev signed legislation abolishing the military courts as part of reforms to the country's judicial system.

== Structure and appointment ==
Prior to its abolition, the Military Courts of Kyrgyzstan consisted of a chairman, a deputy chairman, and other judges, who were elected by the Jogorku Kenesh for 10 year terms. Candidates for appointment as judges were required to be citizens of Kyrgyzstan on active military service, be at least 25 years of age, possess a higher legal education, hold a military officer rank, and have at least two years of professional legal experience. Candidates for the position of chairman and deputy chairman were required to have at least five years of experience as a judge.

== Abolition ==
Proposals to abolish the military courts had been discussed as part of wider judicial reforms following the 2010 Kyrgyz Revolution. The primary reason for their abolition was their comparatively low caseload relative to the resources required to maintain a separate military court system. In 2015, the 387 judges serving in local courts were allocated a budget of KGS 724 million, compared with KGS 24 million for the 14 military court judges. This is despite civilian judges reportedly handling more than 40 cases per month, while military court judges handled an average of nine cases per month.

In November 2016, the Jogorku Kenesh approved legislation providing for the abolition of the military courts and the transfer of their jurisdiction to the local courts. The legislation passed its third reading by 85 votes to 27. The reform was subsequently signed into law by President Almazbek Atambayev on 27 December 2016, formally abolishing the country's military court system.

Following the abolition, military judges and other staff members were transferred to other parts of the judiciary, particularly local courts with heavier caseloads. Jurisdiction over criminal cases involving military personnel, including offences classified as military crimes, was transferred to the ordinary courts.

Since the abolition of the military courts, some lawmakers have called for their reestablishment, although these proposals have not resulted in their restoration. Proponents have argued that military personnel have not received adequate legal protection or fair resolution in the civilian court system.

== See also ==
- Courts of Kyrgyzstan
- Armed Forces of Kyrgyzstan
