= Constitution of Kyrgyzstan =

Supreme law of the Kyrgyz Republic

The Constitution of Kyrgyzstan (Kyrgyz: Кыргыз Республикасынын Конституциясы, romanized: Kyrgyz Respublikasynyn Konstitutsiyasy; Russian: Конституция Кыргызской Республики, romanized: Konstitutsiya Kyrgyzskoy Respubliki) is the supreme law of the Kyrgyz Republic. Kyrgyzstan first got a constitution in 1993, a year and a half after the country had gained independence from the Soviet Union in 1991. It has gone through a few constitutions, with the last one being adopted in April 2021.

== History ==
=== 1937 constitution ===
The 1937 Constitution of the Kirghiz Soviet Socialist Republic was adopted by the Extraordinary V All-Kirghiz Congress of Soviets on March 23, 1937, based on the 1936 Soviet Constitution. This constitution was amended on March 25, 1948.

=== 1978 constitution ===
The 1978 Constitution of the Kirghiz SSR, based on the 1977 Soviet Constitution, was adopted on April 20, 1978, and served as the legal basis for the state, social development, and ideological principles of Kirghizia.

On August 31, 1991, the Kirghiz SSR declared independence as the Republic of Kyrgyzstan and the 1978 constitution was amended until it lost its legal validity in 1993.

=== 1993 constitution ===
The first post-Soviet constitution was adopted on 5 May 1993.

The 1993 constitution was amended several times: first on 10 February 1996, then on 2 February 2003, and finally twice in quick succession on 9 November 2006 and 15 January 2007 after the Tulip Revolution of March 2005. The last two amendments were adopted under pressure from protracted public protests in the capital Bishkek, but they were annulled in September 2007 by the Constitutional Court, which restored the 2003 constitution and paved the way for another constitutional referendum in October 2007.

=== 2010 constitution ===
The Constitution of Kyrgyzstan was the supreme law of the Kyrgyz Republic. The constitution in force from 2010 until 2021 was passed by referendum on June 27, 2010, replacing the previous constitution. It introduced a strong parliament to the country, reducing the power of the historically strong president. The constitution is similar in many ways to the previous one.

=== 2021 constitution ===
The current constitution of Kyrgyzstan was passed by referendum on 11 April 2021, replacing the 2010 Constitution of Kyrgyzstan. Dubbed the "khanstitution" due to its concentration of power in the presidency, it reintroduced a strong president to the country, reducing the power of the legislative branch. Will Partlett describes the new constitution as making structural changes that "move Kyrgyzstan away from a checks-and-balances system of semi-presidentialism toward a form of presidentialism that is close to the authoritarian-style 'crown-presidentialism' in the post-Soviet Eurasian space."
