= Kremenchuk =

Kremenchuk Кременчук
- City
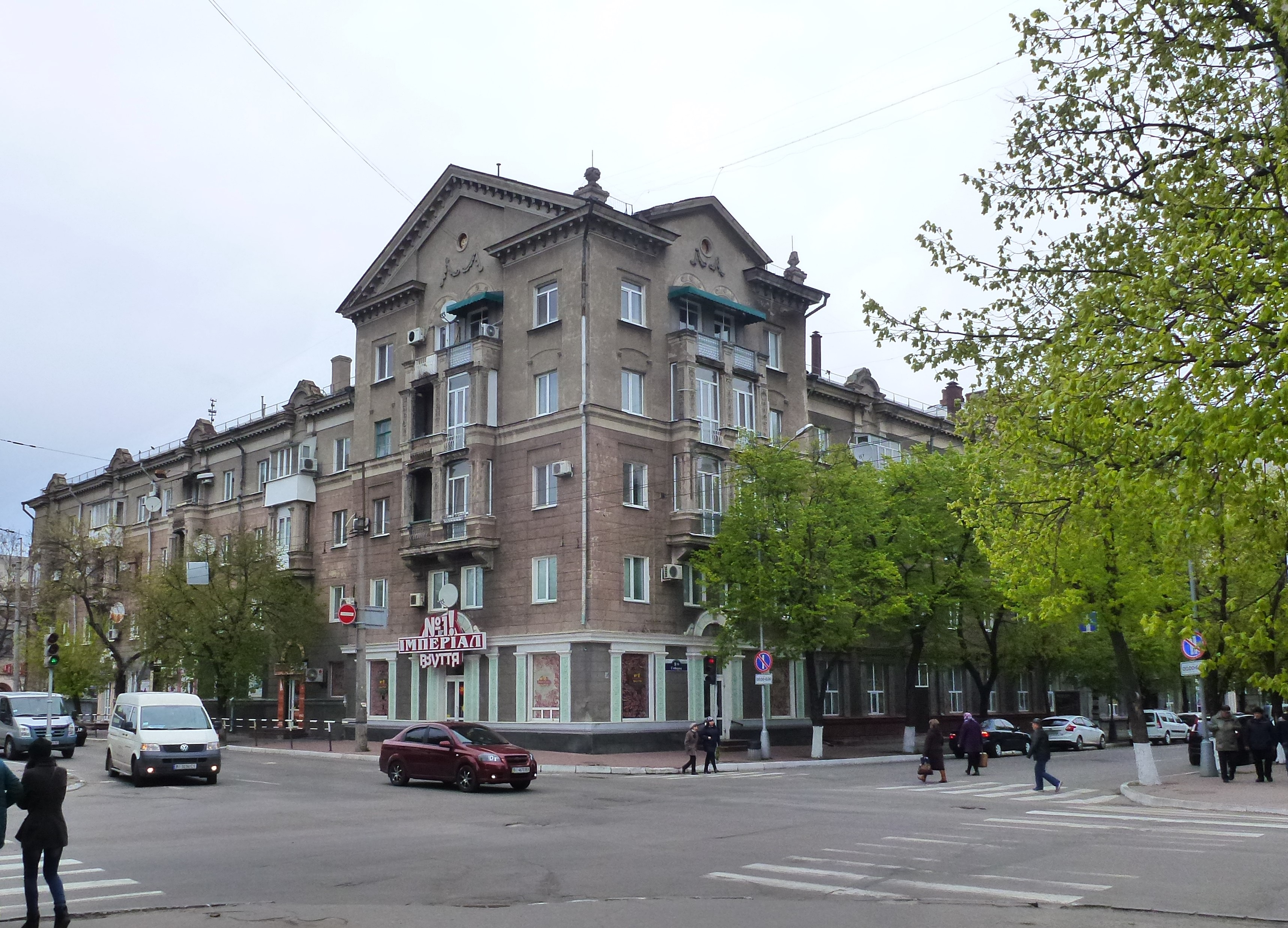
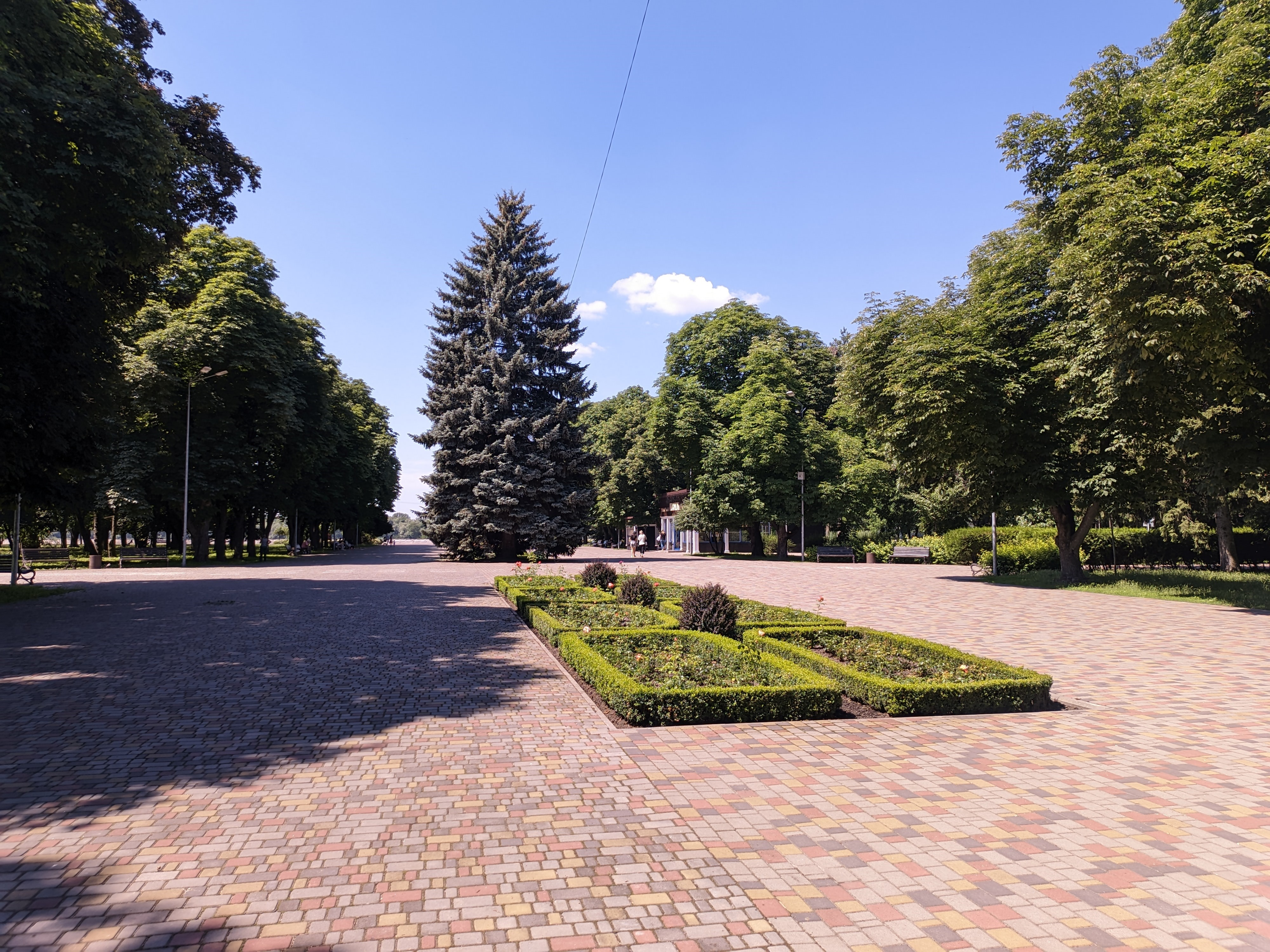
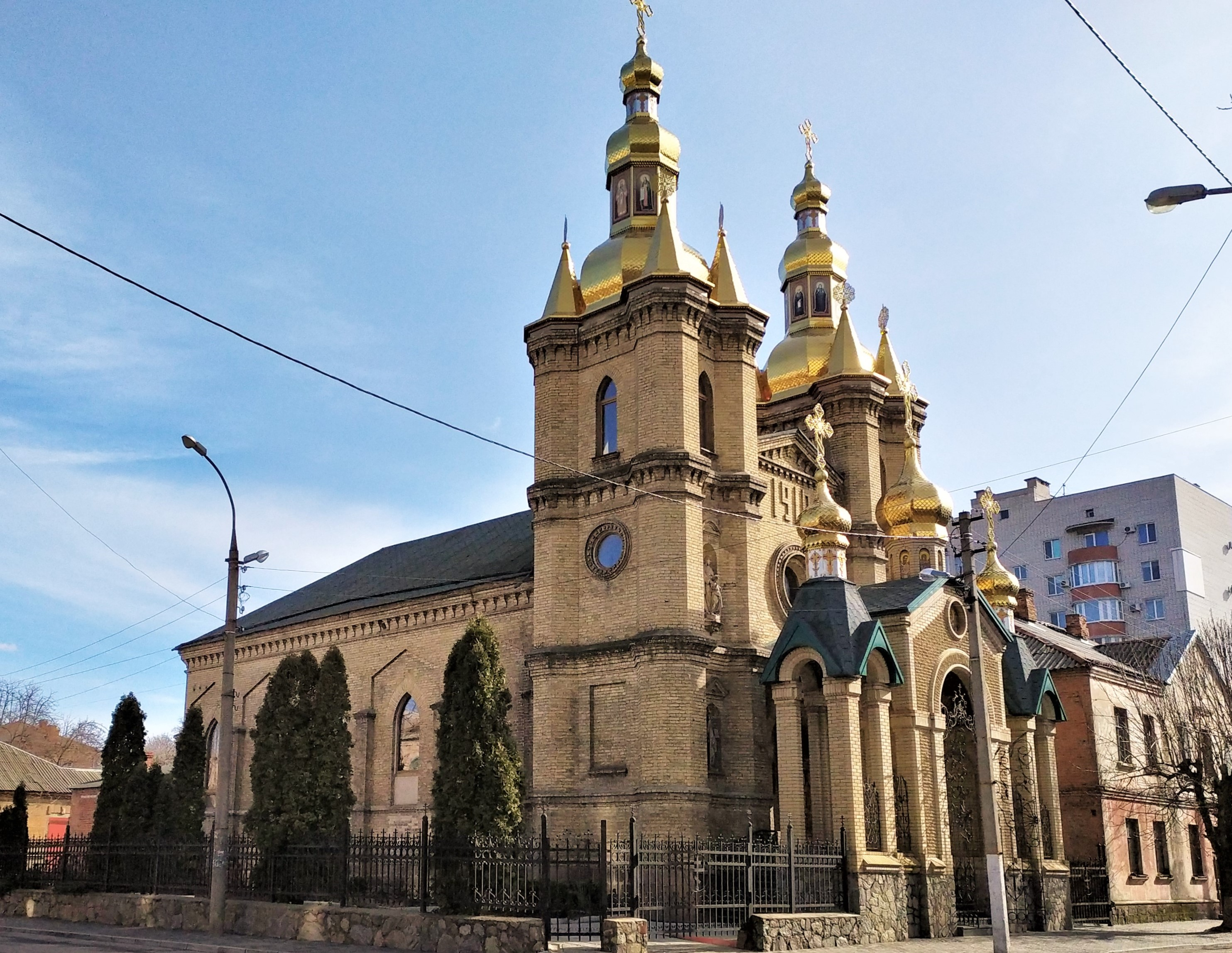
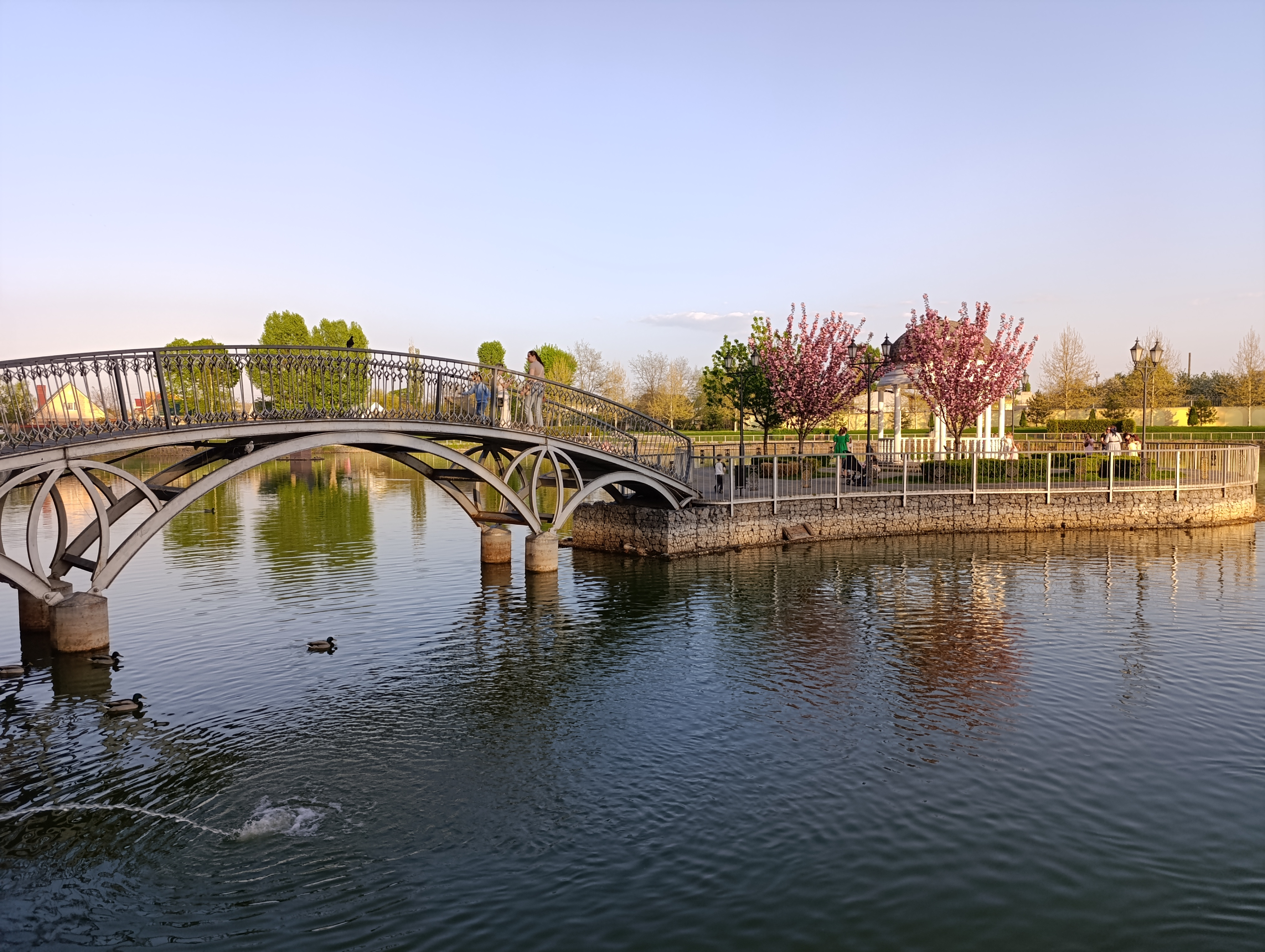
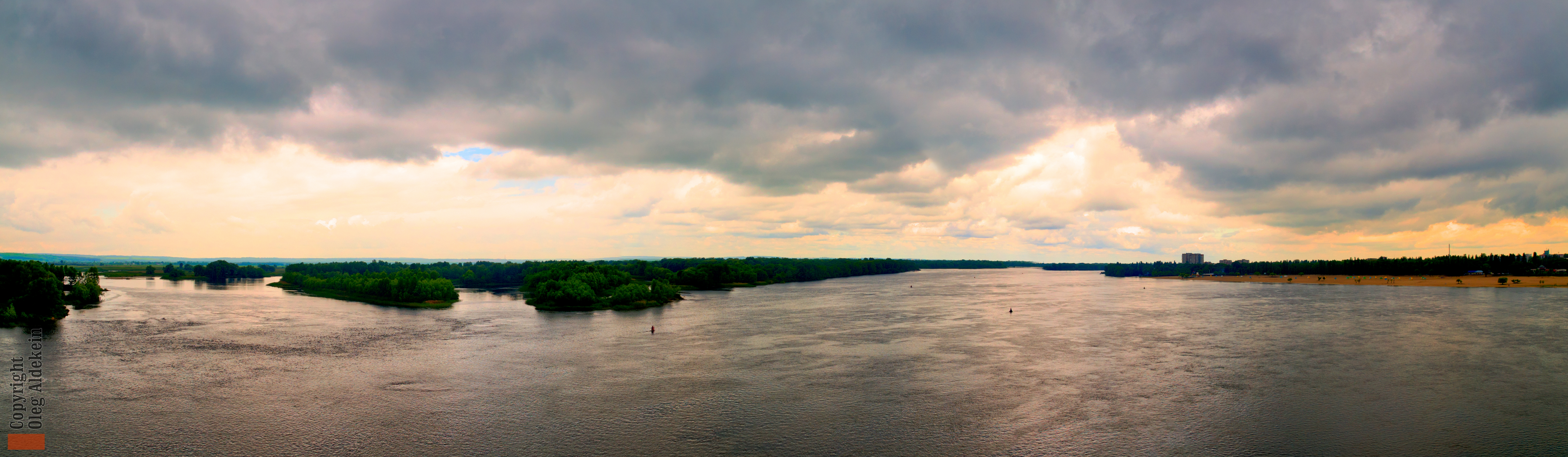
- Soborna Street Prydniprovskyi Park St. Nicholas church City Garden Dnieper River

- Flag Coat of arms
- Interactive map of Kremenchuk
- Location within Poltava Oblast Location within Ukraine
- Coordinates: 49°03′47″N 33°24′14″E
- Country: Ukraine
- Oblast: Poltava Oblast
- Raion: Kremenchuk Raion
- Hromada: Kremenchuk urban hromada
- Founded: 1571
- Districts: List of 2: Avtozavodskyi District; Kriukivskyi District

Government
  - Mayor: Vitalii Maletskyi

Area
  - Total: 96 km^{2} (37 sq mi)
- Elevation: 80 m (260 ft)

Population (2022)
  - Total: 215,271
  - Density: 2,200/km^{2} (5,800/sq mi)
- Time zone: UTC+2 (EET)
  - Summer (DST): UTC+3 (EEST)
- Postcode district(s): 39600-39689
- Area code: 5366
- Vehicle registration: BI
- Website: www.kremen.gov.ua

Kremenchuk (Note: See § Name for alternative spellings and pronunciations.) is an city in central Ukraine which stands on the banks of the Dnieper River. The city serves as the administrative center of Kremenchuk Raion and Kremenchuk urban hromada within Poltava Oblast. Its population is approximately 215,271 (2022 estimate), making it the second-largest city in Poltava Oblast and the 31st largest city in Ukraine. In 2001, the Ukrainian government included the city in the list of historical settlements.

Kremenchuk is believed to have been founded in 1571, when a fortress was nominally established in the city after the signing of the Union of Lublin. Despite this, the area remained depopulated for decades afterward until 1635, when French engineer Guillaume Le Vasseur de Beauplan actually built a small fortress for Kremenchuk, which was the year the city was granted Magdeburg law rights. The city was then seized by the Cossack Hetmanate in the Khmelnytsky Uprising, before finally being burned down in a siege as part of the Polish–Russian War (1654–1667) in 1663. Kremenchuk was then revived by the Russian Empire following the Treaty of Andrusovo under the name of Kremenchug, when it became the capital of the Novorossiya Governorate for a short time, before being demoted again. During this time, the fortress fell into decay, and the city shifted towards being of industrial importance on the Dnieper. After the Russian Civil War, the city was claimed by the Ukrainian SSR in 1919, and in 1922 the city was annexed into the Soviet Union, initially as the capital of the short-lived Kremenchuk Governorate. The city was then affected by World War II, which saw the massacre of its sizable Jewish population - 22% before the war - as part of the Holocaust and the killing of tens of thousands in prisoner of war camps before being liberated during the Battle of the Dnieper. After it recovered, the city became an industrial powerhouse due to the opening of KrAZ and the Kremenchuk Oil Refinery. After the collapse of the Soviet Union, the city became part of a newly independent Ukraine.

Kremenchuk remains heavily industrialised, with some of its largest enterprises being KrAZ, Kryukiv Railway Car Building Works, and the Kremenchuk Oil Refinery, although the latter was destroyed in 2022. Cultural landmarks include Peace Park and the Stone Tower, which was built in the late 1700s. The city has multiple museums, including the Kremenchuk Museum of Local Lore, the All-Ukrainian Museum of the History of Uniforms, and the Museum of the History of Aviation, among others. The city is home to the association football team FC Kremin Kremenchuk, which play their home games at Kremin-Arena, and the ice hockey club HC Kremenchuk, which plays at Aisberg Arena. The city is also home to multiple institutions of higher education, most notably Kremenchuk National University.

== Name ==
=== Current names ===
- Ukrainian: Кременчук, romanized: Kremenchuk (/ˌkrɛmənˈtʃuːk, ˌkrɪmɪnˈ-/; IPA: [kremenˈtʃuk])
- Russian: Кременчуг, romanized: Kremenchug)

=== Etymology of Kremenchuk ===
There have been numerous theories about the etymology of the word Kremenchuk as there is no clear consensus. The most widespread theory is that the first part of the name "kremen" is derived from the Turkish language word of kermençik or kermen, which means "small fortress" or "fortification". The "-chuk" in the name was simply added on as a diminutive suffix that is Slavic. This theory is believed to be supported by the naming of the Scythian Neapolis in Crimea, which is also popularly called "Kermenchik", with the ke meaning elevation and the chik meaning small. Vyrsky also says that toponyms similar to Kremenchuk are not unique, and can be found elsewhere in the Ukrainian steppe, which suggests the name is not locally tied and gives weight to the fortification theories. This version is also supported by P. I. Keppen, who said that Kermenchik was Ukrainised into a form like Kremenchuk. However, other theories exist, such as another popular one that derives kremenchuk from the word kremin', meaning flint, because of the chert in the city. This version is present in legends in the city, such as that the founder of the city was a fisherman known as Kremin'. Another legend about where the name comes from is that the founder of the city was known as "Kremen-Chuh", who was described in legend as the son of a man named Chuh, with the father Chuh being the person the city of Chuhuiv is named after, although again this does not have any scholarly basis.

== History ==
=== Early history ===
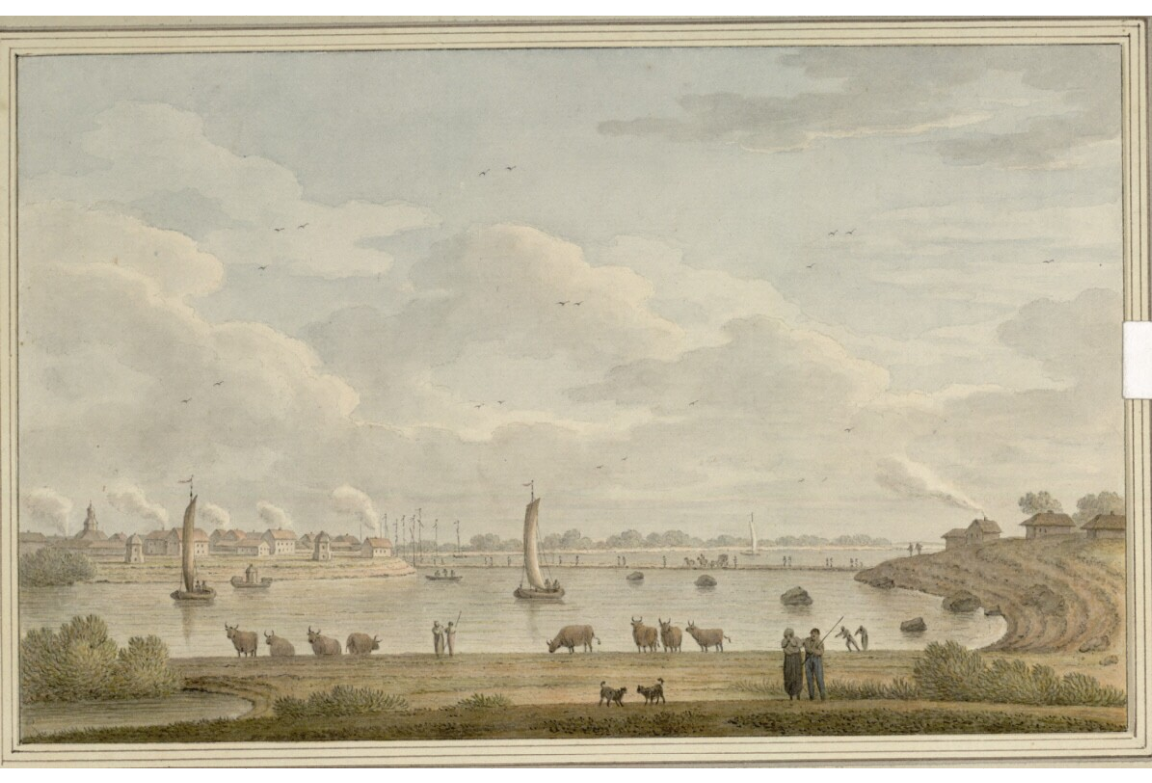
View of the city and river port in 1781

Human settlement around the area of present-day Kremenchuk began during the Mesolithic era as part of the Kukrets culture. Over successive centuries, the area would then be occupied by numerous different cultures, from the Dnieper–Donets culture to the Chernyakhov culture. A notable settlement during this time was Rakivka/Rakivske, which was founded during the Neolithic era in what is today's Kriukivskyi District, and would be successively inhabited for multiple eras. However, the area slowly became depopulated over time following the Mongol invasion of Kievan Rus', especially during the era of Meñli I Giray, whose forces extensively raided the area. Even after this depopulation, a fortified point under various names for Kremenchuk was noted by both the Grand Duchy of Lithuania and the Grand Principality of Moscow in writing, and the area is also sometimes believed to have been used as a seasonal fishing/hunting spot. However, most scholars agree the city's founding date is 1571, which is when, after the signing of the Union of Lublin, Hryhoriy Svyrhovsky nominally established a fortress in the city for the Crown of the Kingdom of Poland. Despite Svyrhovsky formally establishing it, though, the site of the fortress would remain depopulated for decades afterwards, and no significant progress was ever actually made on building the fortress after its founding in 1571, despite attempts. The city and fortress would actually be finally developed in 1635 as Krzemienczuk, when French engineer Guillaume Le Vasseur de Beauplan built a small, older fortress for the city, which was also the year the city was granted Magdeburg law rights.

Shortly thereafter, during the Khmelnytsky Uprising, Kremenchuk was seized by the Cossack Hetmanate, and incorporated as a sotnia of the Chyhyryn Regiment. After a few years, it was even elevated to having its own regiment, known as the Kremenchuk Regiment, from 1661 to 1663, before being de-elevated back down into the Myrhorod Regiment. During the fighting over Ukraine and the Hetmanate as part of the wider Polish–Russian War (1654–1667), the city changed hands multiple times between pro-Polish and pro-Muscovite Cossacks, before finally being decisively burned during a siege by the Muscovites in 1663.

=== Imperial Russian rule ===
After becoming part of the Tsardom of Russia finally during the Treaty of Andrusovo in 1667, the ruined city would remain minor for decades, until it was slowly revived throughout the 1700s under Russian rule under the Russian name of Kremenchug. The revived city reached a peak shortly thereafter, after becoming the capital of the Novorossiya Governorate for a short time, but it was demoted back down. The city then lost its administrative importance in favour of Poltava with the establishment of the Poltava Governorate after a severe plague and flood hit the city in the 1780s. After recovering, the city then shifted away from being of military importance due to its fortress, which would slowly be neglected, to becoming a trade centre of the Dnieper with the establishment of the Kriukiv Railway Car Building Works in the neighbouring town of Kriukiv, which would later be incorporated into Kremenchug. This was also the time that its Jewish population rapidly grew due to being within the Pale of Settlement. During the brief 1905 Russian Revolution, the city saw major strikes, but these were suppressed by city authorities.

=== Soviet rule ===
==== Ukrainian War of Independence ====
After the outbreak of the Ukrainian War of Independence as part of the wider Russian Civil War, the city of Krermenchug would change hands repeatedly. It was briefly under Bolshevik rule following the October Revolution, although by November 1917 the Ukrainian People's Republic took over. The Bolsheviks briefly recaptured the city in January 1918. However, they were pushed back when the Imperial German Army arrived in support of the UPR, with the Germans then occupying the city for some months as part of the 1918 Central Powers occupation of Ukraine. However, it was still nominally part of the UPR, especially because, unlike other cities, the Germans did not attempt to exert much control over the city and gave more powers to the Ukrainians. It was briefly taken by the Ukrainian State after a coup, before again becoming part of the UPR until the Germans withdrew after their defeat during World War I, which led the Bolsheviks to retake the city. However, insurgent forces as part of the Hryhoriv Uprising then briefly took the city from the Bolsheviks after turning on them, although the Bolsheviks managed to quickly regain it after the forces of Hryhoriv started a pogrom on the Jewish population of the city, killing 140 in Kremenchug proper and 10 in Kriukiv. After some time of Bolshevik-consolidated rule again, the White movement took the city, during which time they started a pogrom also, in addition to killing six girls they associated with the Komsomol, which turned the citizens away from them. The Bolsheviks then retook the city for a final time in December 1919, and in 1922 the city was annexed into the Soviet Union.

==== Interwar, World War II, post-war ====
Due to instability in the region following the war, the city then briefly served as the capital of the very short-lived Kremenchuk Governorate, before it was again demoted back down. During the interwar period, the city saw some industrialisation and a brief, visible revival of Jewish life, although Jewish organisations were quickly shut down not long after and a policy of Ukrainisation and Russification began under Joseph Stalin. The city was also devastated by a giant flood in 1931 combined with the Great Purge and the Holodomor, although in the case of the latter the city actually saw a population surge due to starving peasants moving to the city.

After the start of Operation Barbarossa as part of World War II, the city was captured by Nazi German forces in September 1941. Under the Germans, the Jewish population, which had decreased to 22% prior to the war, was systematically massacred as part of the Holocaust. In addition, the city was also the site of multiple prisoner of war camps, with tens of thousands of prisoners dying under German rule. The city was eventually liberated in September 1943 by Soviet forces during the initial stages of the Battle of the Dnieper, which is now celebrated as City Day, although in the aftermath the city was left devestated, with the majority of its prewar buildings being destroyed.

After the war, the reconstructed city became the site of massive industrial growth thanks to the opening of KrAZ and the Kremenchuk Oil Refinery. During the Cold War, Kremenchuk also became the headquarters for the 43rd Rocket Division of the 43rd Army of the Soviet Strategic Rocket Forces. In 1975 the city of Kriukiv, which had long been separate on the other bank of the Dnieper, was merged with Kremenchuk, while Kremenchuk was divided in two raions in city.

=== In an independent Ukraine ===
After the collapse of the Soviet Union, the city became a part of an independent Ukraine in 1991. Shortly thereafter, many of the city's industries were privatised, although the oil refinery went through a brief period of instability before gaining more independence post-2012, when it became the last remaining oil refinery in the country after the closure of the Lysychansk Oil Refinery. During Euromaidan, the city saw massive protests in favour of pro-European forces, which culminated in February 2014 with the destruction of two monuments to Vladimir Lenin during the wider demolition of monuments to Vladimir Lenin in Ukraine. However, the city would gain wider traction in the following months with the assassination of mayor Oleh Babaiev for inconclusive reasons, although preliminary theories during investigations theorised it was on the orders of the "Vizit" company. After the revolution, the city then had a wave of decommunisation, while KrAZ became central to the wider rearmament effort during the War in the Donbas due to its construction of heavy armoured vehicles.

Until 18 July 2020, Kremenchuk was designated as a city of oblast significance and did not belong to Kremenchuk Raion even though it was the center of the raion. As part of the administrative reform of Ukraine, which reduced the number of raions of Poltava Oblast to four, the city was merged into Kremenchuk Raion. After the start of the Russian invasion of Ukraine, the city saw a massive influx of internally displaced people from the frontlines, which, as of 2026, number 31,000 in the city alone. The city has also seen repeated Russian strikes against the city's infrastructure, leading to frequent power cuts and the destruction of the city's oil refinery. The city's deadliest attack came in June 2022 when Russian forces, using cruise missiles, struck the Amstor shopping mall in the city, which killed 22 people and left 59 injured. The attack was widely condemned by world leaders as a war crime.

== Geography ==
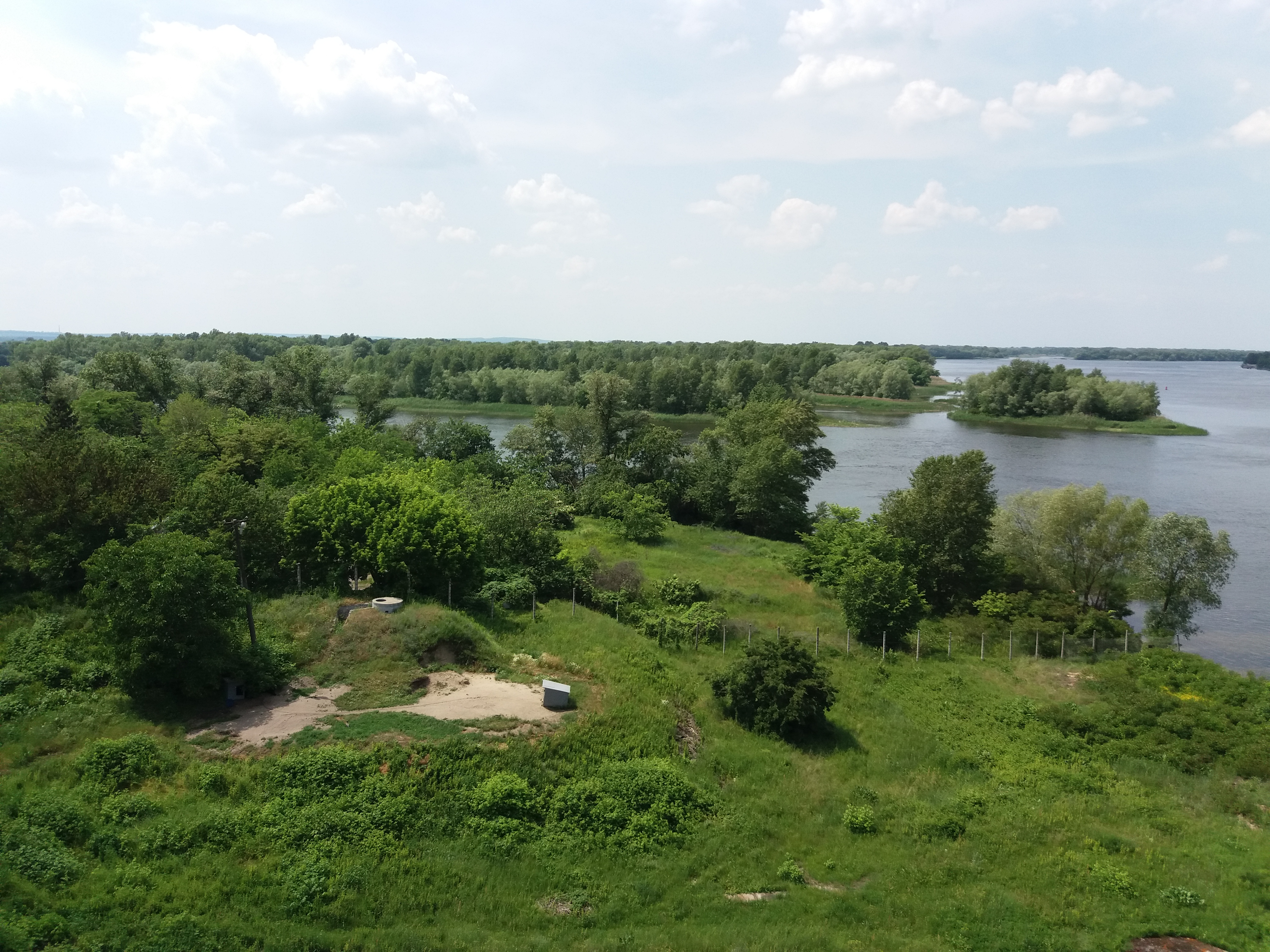
Biletskivski plavni in Kremenchuk which is a national natural heritage site.

View of the Dnieper River in Kremenchuk.

Kremenchuk is located on the Dnieper Lowland on the boundary between the Ukrainian Shield and the Dnieper-Donets Rift. The right and left bank parts of Kremenchuk are separated by the Dnieper River, which runs through the city, with the left bank of the city sitting low with depressions, and the right-bank being slightly more elevated. The city is host to three different rivers: Sukhyi Omelnyk, which flows into the Psel from the right bank and crosses through the northernmost part of the city, Sukhyi Kahamlyk, which flows into the Kryva Ruda from the right bank through the heavily urbanised parts of the city north to south, and Kryva Ruda itself, which is a left-bank tributary of the Dnieper and crosses through the city from the northwest to southeast. Kremenchuk is also situated at the very left portion of the Kamianske Reservoir, where the port of the city is.

The city has multiple natural landscape areas. Biletskivski plavni is the only one of national significance, covering an area of 2,980 hectares, and is part of the wider Kremenchuk floodplains. Biletskivski is notable for being a relatively well-preserved section of the floodplains of the Dnieper, as most of the floodplains in the area were destroyed due to the construction of man-made reservoirs. The wider Kremenchuk floodplains are a regional landscape park created in 2001 and cover an area of 5,080 hectares, which has over 50 rare species within it and the island of Shalamai. "Rock-granity quarry" is a local geological monument of nature that is an outcrop of migmatite believed to be 3 billion years old, and is also notable for having marks carved into the rocks from past floods, going all the way back to 1787. The last two are both park monuments: Prydniprovskyi, which contains more than 60 species and 18,000 other specimens of trees and shrubs, and City Garden, which is one of the oldest surviving parks in Ukraine, dating back to 1787 and was designed by Englishman William Gould.

=== Climate ===
Konotop has a warm-summer humid continental climate (Köppen Dfb). During the summer months, Kremenchuk is warm to hot, with an average temperature in June being 21 °C (70 °F) and July being 24 °C (75 °F). The record high recorded in the city is around 39 °C (102 °F), which was recorded in August. The coldest months are during the wintertime in January and February, when the average temperature is around −5 °C (23 °F) in January and −4 °C (25 °F) in February. The record low recorded in the village is around −35 °C (−31 °F), which was recorded in December. The wettest month by average precipitation is June, which has an average of 64mm of precipitation, with January being the driest at around 40mm of precipitation. The annual precipitation averages to be around 545mm per year.

Climate data for Kremenchuk (1991-2025)
Month	Jan	Feb	Mar	Apr	May	Jun	Jul	Aug	Sep	Oct	Nov	Dec	Year
Record high °C (°F)	8.93 (48.07)	12.87 (55.17)	20.27 (68.49)	28.94 (84.09)	34.18 (93.52)	36.69 (98.04)	38.40 (101.12)	39.02 (102.24)	35.07 (95.13)	29.43 (84.97)	19.13 (66.43)	14.05 (57.29)	39.02 (102.24)
Daily mean °C (°F)	−5.29 (22.48)	−3.78 (25.20)	1.94 (35.49)	9.46 (49.03)	15.91 (60.64)	20.83 (69.49)	23.51 (74.32)	22.77 (72.99)	16.33 (61.39)	8.98 (48.16)	1.93 (35.47)	−3.24 (26.17)	9.18 (48.52)
Record low °C (°F)	−33.92 (−29.06)	−32.96 (−27.33)	−21.76 (−7.17)	−6.59 (20.14)	0.87 (33.57)	7.01 (44.62)	10.32 (50.58)	8.86 (47.95)	−1.49 (29.32)	−5.45 (22.19)	−27.39 (−17.30)	−34.44 (−29.99)	−34.44 (−29.99)
Average precipitation mm (inches)	39.6 (1.56)	33.3 (1.31)	40.0 (1.57)	39.6 (1.56)	55.5 (2.19)	64.2 (2.53)	55.8 (2.20)	39.8 (1.57)	49.7 (1.96)	43.7 (1.72)	41.9 (1.65)	41.5 (1.63)	544.5 (21.44)
Source: NASA Power

== Legal status and politics ==
=== Legal status ===
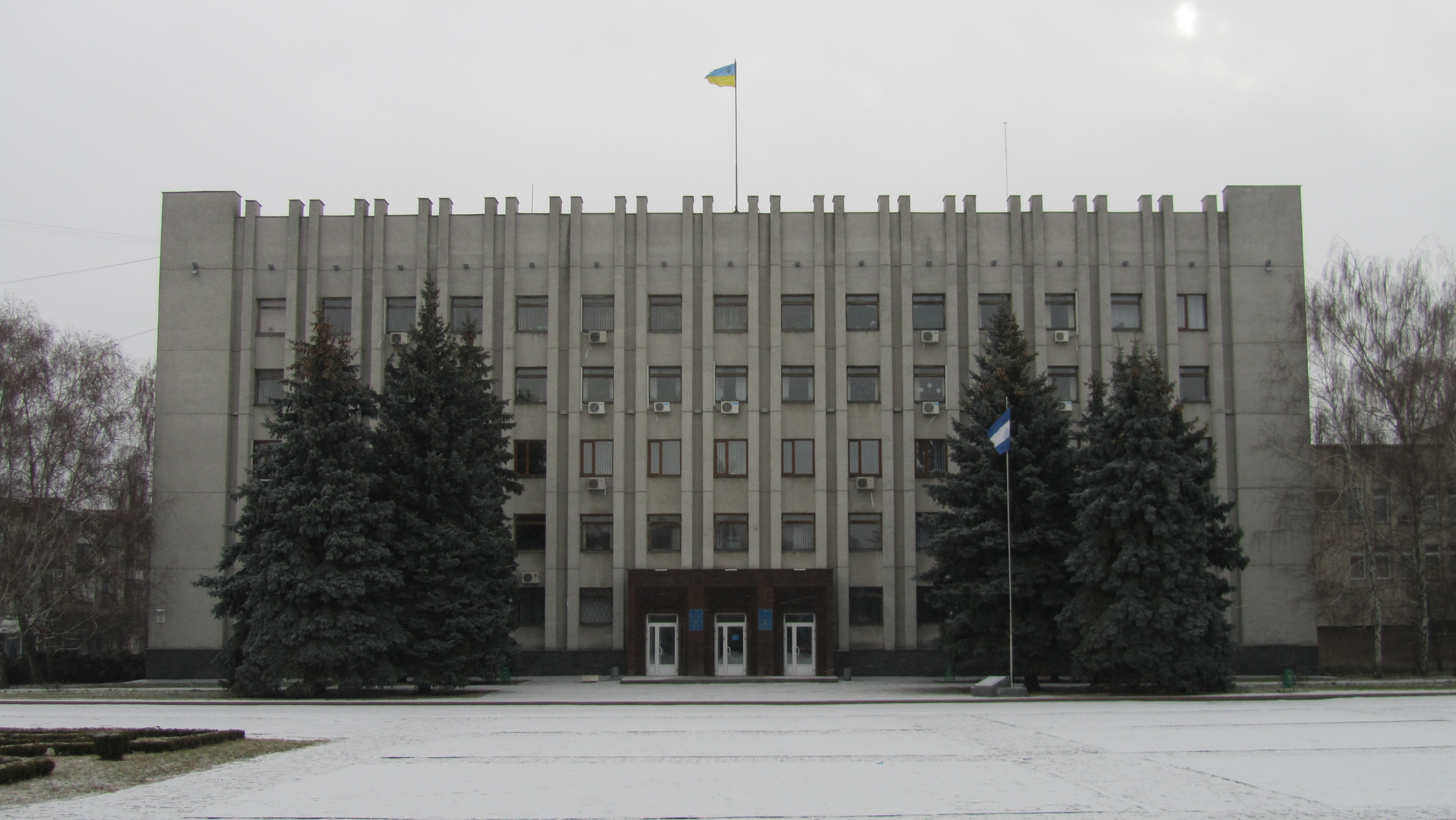
Kremenchuk City Council building.

The city of Kremenchuk is governed by the Kremenchuk City Council, with the head of the city council being the mayor of the city, which as of 2026 is Vitaliy Maletskyi of the local party "For the Future". The city council, as of 2010, consists of 42 deputies. The mayor and the city council regularly meet together at the Kremenchuk City Council building. Until 2020, Konotop was a city of regional significance; however, in July 2020, as part of administrative reform, Zelenskyy abolished this system and incorporated Kremenchuk into the Kremenchuk urban hromada. The city was also incorporated as the administrative seat of the Kremenchuk Raion within Poltava Oblast.

=== Politics ===
After Ukrainian independence, the city's voters generally favoured a split of both pro-European and pro-Russian parties, although this has shifted somewhat after Euromaidan. In the 2010 Ukrainian local elections, of the 60 seats in the city council, neither side won an outright majority. 18 (30%) of the seats were won by the pro-European Batkivshchyna, while 17 (28.3%) of the seats were won by the Party of Regions. The city also had a relatively high proportion of local parties, as 13 deputies (21.7%) were elected from Ridne Misto. Similarly, as part of constituency 146 (which covers the entirety of Kriukivskyi and most of Avtozavodskyi) during the 2010 Ukrainian presidential election, 28.44% of the city voted for the pro-European Yulia Tymoshenko while 25.59% voted for the pro-Russian Viktor Yanukovych in the first round. In the second round, this deviated slightly, with around 50% voting for Tymoshenko and 40% for Yanukovych.

After Euromaidan, during the 2019 Ukrainian presidential election, 37.94% voted for the pro-European Volodymyr Zelenskyy and 13.25% for the also pro-European Petro Poroshenko, while only 12.78% voted for the pro-Russian Yuriy Boyko. During the following 2020 Ukrainian local elections, 9 of the 42 mandates went to the local Ridno Misto, 9 to For the Future, and 6 each to Opposition Platform - For Life, Servant of the People, and European Solidarity.

=== Administrative divisions ===
Administrative divisions of Kremenchuk. Avtozavodskyi is in green, Kriukivskyi is in orange.

The city is divided into two administrative subdivisions: Avtozavodskyi District and Kriukivskyi District. The area of Kriukivskyi District is 33.55 km, with a population of 75,400, and consists of areas mostly on the right bank of Kremenchuk alongside some areas of the left bank: some of the centre of Kremenchuk, all of Kriukiv, the microdistrict Rakivka, and the first, second, and third embarkments. The area of Avtozavodskyi District is 50.99 km, and it consists of areas entirely on the left bank of Kremenchuk: some of the city centre of Kremenchuk, Shchemylivka, Reivka, Novoivanivka, Mlynky, Cherednyky, Lashky, Velyka Kokhnivka, and Molodizhnyi.

Kriukivskyi District was originally formed in 1928, encompassing most of the former town of Kriukiv, which was annexed to Kremenchuk that year. The district was liquidated in 1959, until it was re-formed on 3 March 1975 by the Verkhovna Rada, which, in the same decree, created another district - Avtozavodskyi District. Briefly, from 1975 to 1977, the modern-day city of Horishni Plavni (then Komsomolsk) was annexed and subordinated to the Kriukivskyi District, before regaining its independence in 1977.

== Demographics ==
=== Population ===
Historical population

Year	Pop.	±%
1897	63,007	—
1920	66,403	+5.4%
1926	58,332	−12.2%
1939	89,723	+53.8%
1959	86,569	−3.5%
1970	148,117	+71.1%

Year	Pop.	±%
1979	209,616	+41.5%
1989	236,495	+12.8%
2001	234,073	−1.0%
2010	227,611	−2.8%
2014	225,828	−0.8%
2022	215,271	−4.7%

According to the 2001 All-Ukrainian Census, the only official nationwide post-independence census done in Ukraine, the population of Kremenchuk in 2001 was 234,073. The most recent estimate was done by the State Statistics Service of Ukraine in 2022, which estimated that the total population in the city was 215,271. Originally, the population of the city was recorded as 63,007 in the only nationwide census done in the Russian Empire in 1897, which steadily grew until the Ukrainian War of Independence. In the aftermath, the population initially recorded a decline, although this was reversed significantly by the start of World War II with the population being recorded at nearly 90,000. In the 1970 Soviet census, the population first crossed the 100,000 mark, being recorded at a significant jump as nearly 150,000. By the end of the decade, in 1979, the population also crossed 200,000 people. However, the population stagnated post-Ukrainian independence, going steadily down from the peak recorded in 1989 of 236,495 people.

==== Ethnicity ====
Ethnic group	1939	2001
Ukrainians	69.07%	83.07%
Russians	7.49%	14.79%
Jews	22.15%	0.39%
Belarusians	0.43%	0.58%

In the 2001 All-Ukrainian Census, the population was almost monolithically Ukrainian, at 83.07%. There was also a small minority of Russians at 14.79%, and both Belarusians and Jews at 0.58% and 0.39%, respectively. In the earlier census that measured demographics, the 1939 census, this was not the same. While Ukrainians still made up the majority at nearly 70%, Jewish people made up a significant minority at 22%, while Russians made up a small minority at 7.49%. The exact ethnic composition according to the 2001 census was as follows:

Ethnic groups in Kremenchuk
	percent
Ukrainians	83.07%
Russians	14.79%
Belarusians	0.58%
Jews	0.39%
Gypsies	0.19%
Armenians	0.20%
Tatars	0.08%
Moldovans	0.08%
Poles	0.07%
Azerbaijanis	0.06%

===== Jewish community and Holocaust =====
Jews initially began to settle in the city in 1782, and by 1801, there were 454 registered taxpayers in Kremenchuk. As a result of Jewish emigration from further north in the Pale of Settlement, many Jews from northern provinces settled in the city in the mid-19th century. The community had grown sevenfold within a half decade to 3,475 by 1847. The 1897 All-Russia Census recorded the Jewish population of Kremenchuk at 29,768, or at 47% of the total population. Growth of the city's Jewish population stagnated, still hovering at 28,969 by 1926, around 50% of the population, later heavily falling to 19,880 by 1939.

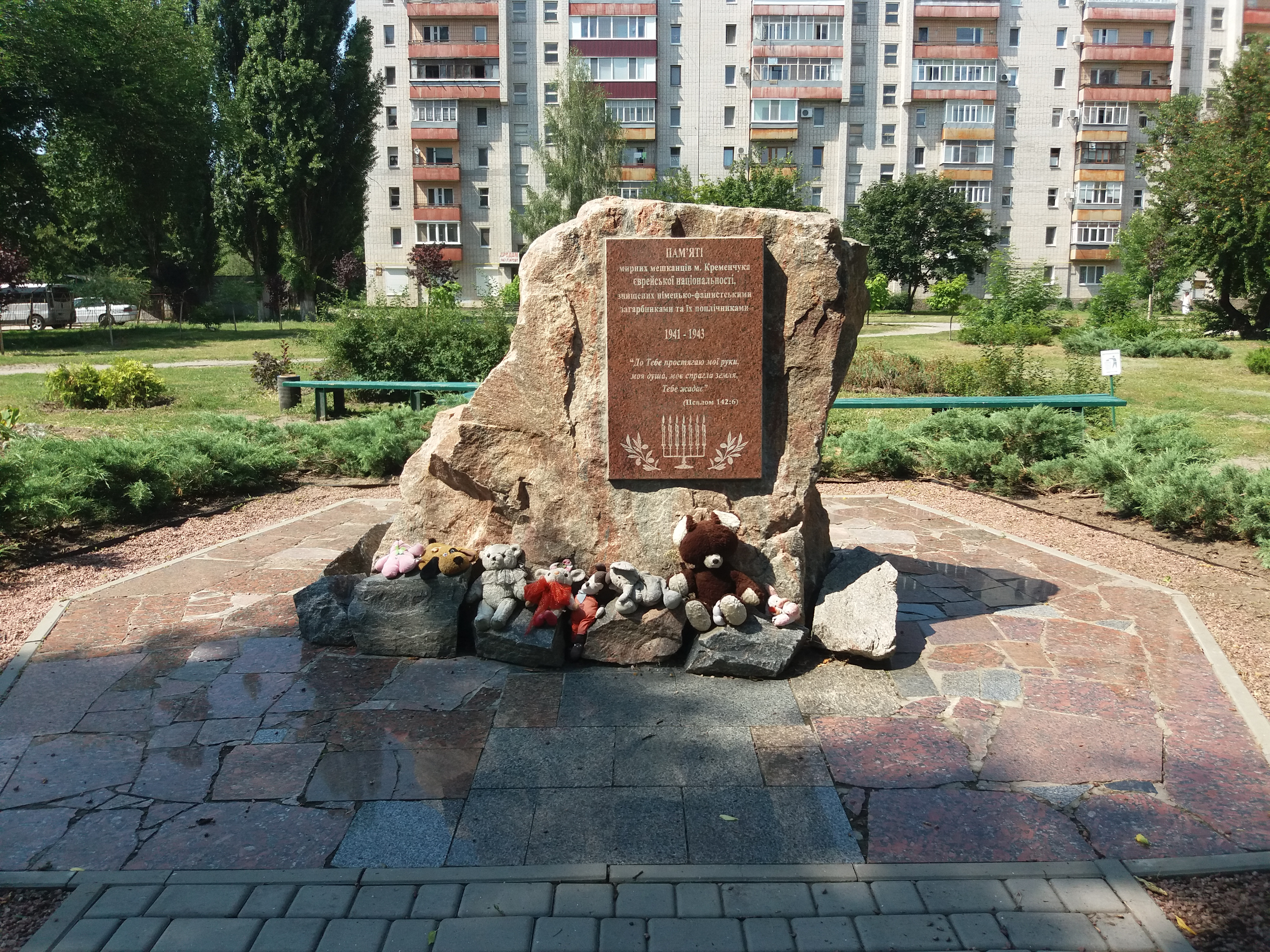
Holocaust memorial

German forces occupied Kremenchuk on 9 September 1941, setting restrictions on Jewish purchases and forcing them to wear the Yellow Star of Jude. On 27 September 1941, they were exiled from the city, and forced to move into the Ghetto in Novo-Ivanovka.^{[uk]} Many Jews who hid throughout the city were later caught and forced into the Ghettos as well. Between October 1941 and January 1942, a total of around 8,000 Jews were shot and killed in various instances of execution over the months, although the community was not entirely wiped out. The Ghetto and town were liberated 29 September 1943 by the Red Army. A Jewish community of over 5,000 remained in the city throughout the 1950s, although dwindled in the 1990s during migration to Israel.

There are a few Jewish cemeteries from different parts of the 20th century in the area, with the last burials having occurred in Jewish Cemetery II in the 1990s.

=== Language ===
According to the 2001 All-Ukrainian Census, Kremenchuk's majority population had a mother tongue of Ukrainian as their native language (75.48%), with a minority speaking Russian as their mother tongue (23.94%). The exact linguistic composition in 2001 was as follows:

Language	Percentage
Ukrainian	75.48%
Russian	23.94%
other/undecided	0.58%

== Media ==
=== Newspapers ===
Kremenchuk has multiple newspapers. Bulletin of Kremenchuk was biweekly and has been published since 1990 by the city council, covering city life, although by the 2010s it started to move away from the city council, and in 2018 it became fully private. Due to not signing contracts and having already shrunk its bulletins, by August 2019 the newspaper shut down in print, and by 2020 its offices were vacated. Kremin is a Russian-language newspaper that is published every Thursday at around 10,000 copies. Kremin was founded in 1917, originally as the organ of the city council during the Soviet era until 1991. The third largest newspaper is Kremenchuk Panorama, which is a socio-political paper founded in 2005 that uses both Ukrainian and Russian and circulates 10,000 copies per week. The largest city newspaper is Kremenchuk Telegraf, which publishes every Thursday in print and has a wide range of content, although primarily focused on city and world news. According to a 2017 compilation, Kremenchuk Telegraf ranks eighth by popularity on Ukrainian news sites.

Other, smaller newspapers include the weekly AVtograf, which was founded in 2000, Pograma Plius, which is an advertising weekly, For Home and Family, which runs every Friday as an advertising and information weekly. There are also numerous corporate organs for the enterprises in the city, such as AvtoKraz, Voda i misto, and Naftokhimik.

=== Radio ===
Kremenchuk has nineteen radio stations on the FM band. Since May 2022, all broadcasting of Russian-language music content on radio stations in public spaces has been banned by the city council:

- Radio ROKS (92.3 MHz), a radio station for rock music. It has been broadcasting in the city since June 2011.
- Radio Relax (93.4 MHz), an easy-listening station. It started broadcasting in the city in December 2019.
- Radio Promin (96.6 MHz), the second radio channel of Suspilne that plays Ukrainian music for the youth. It began broadcasting in Kremenchuk in April 2020.
- Radio M (97.9 MHz), an information radio station that primarily reads scriptures and does prayers. It started broadcasting in the city in October 2020.
- Kiss FM (98.8 MHz), a music station for Eurodance. It began broadcasting in Kremenchuk in June 2006.
- Radio Culture (99.6 MHz), the third radio channel of Suspilne, which focuses on culture and education. It began broadcasting in the city in May 2020.
- Ukrainian Radio (100.9 MHz), a national radio station for news. The frequency was previously used by Radio 5 from 2005 to 2007 and then by Retro FM from 2007 to January 2022. During this time, Ukrainian Radio used 105.4 MHz on even-numbered days until fully switching over to 100.9 MHz in January 2022 and also starting to air Ukrainian Radio - Poltava at limited weekday times.
- Lux FM (101.7 MHz), an entertainment music station. Lux FM has aired in the city since 1995, originally on the 107.7 MHz frequency. On this frequency, it retransmitted Khit FM from 2000 to 2002 and Russkoye Radio Ukraine from 2002 to 2004, before switching to 101.7 MHz in 2008.
- Autoradio (102.1 MHz), a music radio station. It originally began broadcasting in the city in 2005 as Fokus Radio, a retransmitter of NIKO FM, before switching in spring 2006 to Autoradio.
- Perets FM (102.5 MHz), a music and humour station. The frequency was previously used by Open Radio from 2006 to 2013, before being rebroadcast as Perets FM starting in December 2014.
- Melody FM (103.5 MHz), an entertainment station for Eurodisco and 1990s-2000s music. It started in 2001 in the city as Radio Chanson before becoming Radio Alla from 2011 to 2012, and then Radio Next briefly that year, and finally Melody FM in April 2012.
- Radio Bayraktar (103.9 MHz), a patriotic radio station that airs wartime songs and the national anthem of Ukraine. The station was previously used by Russkoye Radio Ukraine from 2004 to February 2022, when it was banned and briefly replaced by a wartime marathon until March 2022.
- Hit FM (104.3 MHz), an entertainment station. It began broadcasting in Kremenchuk in March 2002.
- Shliager FM (104.9 MHz), a pop and chanson music station. It originally started airing in the city in March 2010 after having been part-time on 1035 MHz as Radio Chanson.
- Our Radio (105.4 MHz), an entertainment station that exclusively plays Ukrainian songs. It has aired in the city since March 2004.
- NRJ Radio (106.0 MHz), a Top 40 music statio. It has broadcast in the city since February 1999, originally as Europa Plus from 1999 to early 2002 and again from October 2002 until April 2016.
- Radio NV (106.6 MHz), an information/news station. It was originally Radio Era FM from 2006 to 2018 before adapting to Radio NV in March 2018.
- DJ FM (107.0 MHz), a music station that airs electronic and club music. It began in Kremenchuk in July 2004 as Radio Sharmanka, then Favourite Radio, and finally Power FM in July 2017 until November 2021.
- Radio Friday (107.7 MHz), a hot music radio station for Ukrainian and foreign-language pop hits. Broadcasting on this frequency began in Kremenchuk in 1995 as Vizma-Radio, then UR-3 Radio Muz, until 2002, finally being re-licensed in 2011 to Super Radio and then Radio Friday in 2015.

=== Television ===
Kremenchuk antenna tower

The main and oldest local television station was "Vizyt", which initially retransmitted Programme One, being owned by the Melnyks, who also created a television tower in 1999 at a cost of over a million hryvnias for the station. Vizyt became well-known starting in 2012 due to ownership disputes with the then-mayor Oleh Babaiev, which led the station to cut off Babaiev's transmissions. The Administrative Court of Appeals in Kharkiv then temporarily suspended the station's broadcasting license for the parliamentary elections in October 2012 after complaints by Yurii Shapovalov. In 2013, Babaiev then announced he would suspend all the station's assets and transfer it to municipal ownership. In late 2014, after the murder of Babaiev and a judge involved with the Vizyt case, the senior Poltava Oblast prosecutor announced that the Melnyks would be put under suspicion. In 2024, after a decade, Vizyt director Oleksandr Melnyk was found guilty in Babaiev's murder, but was acquitted of the murder of the judge. The mast of Vizyt was then repurposed to host multiplex transmissions, including PTV, Misto+, HOK, and Kremenchuk Public Television.

== Religion ==
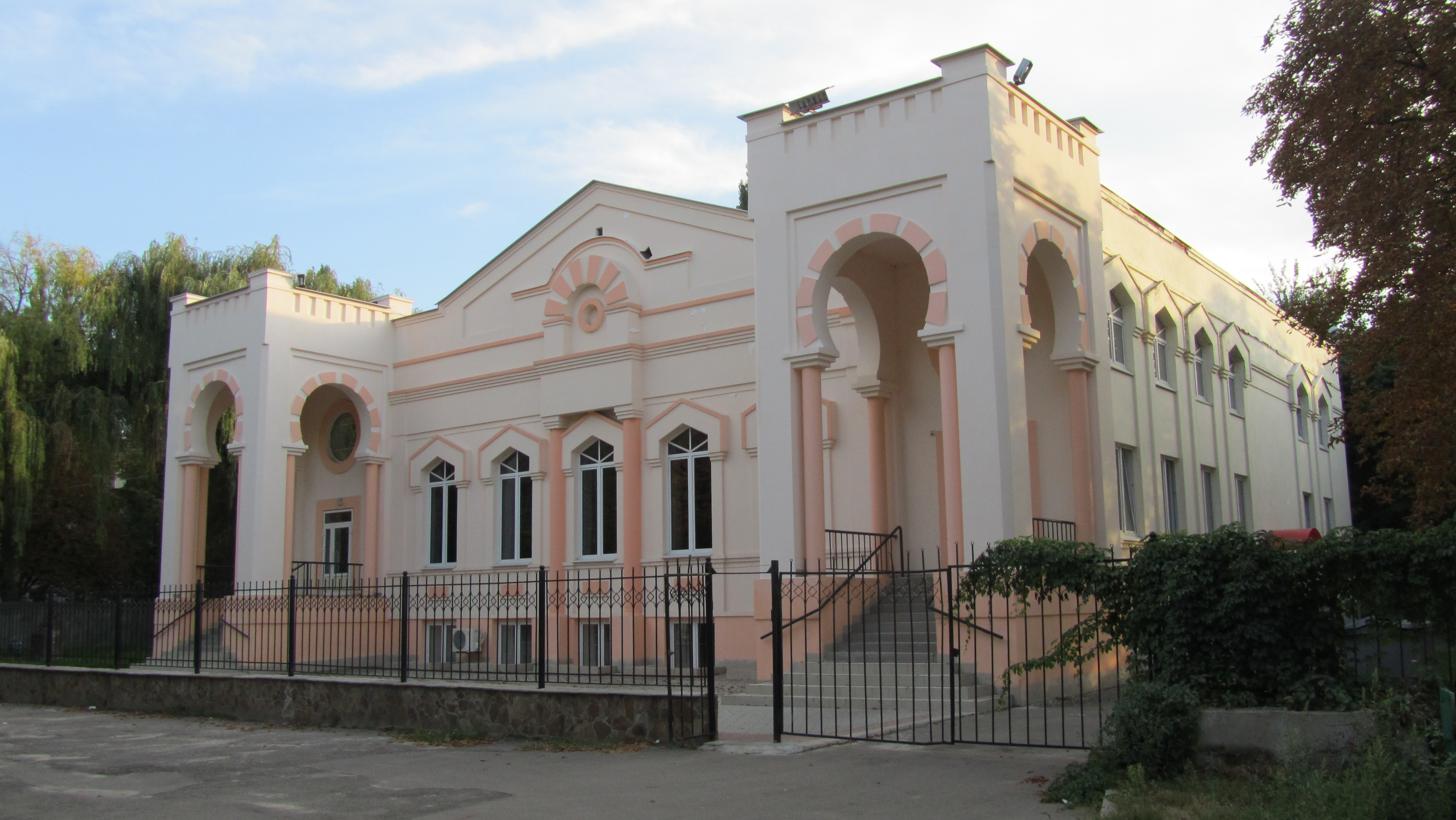
Kremenchuk Synagogue

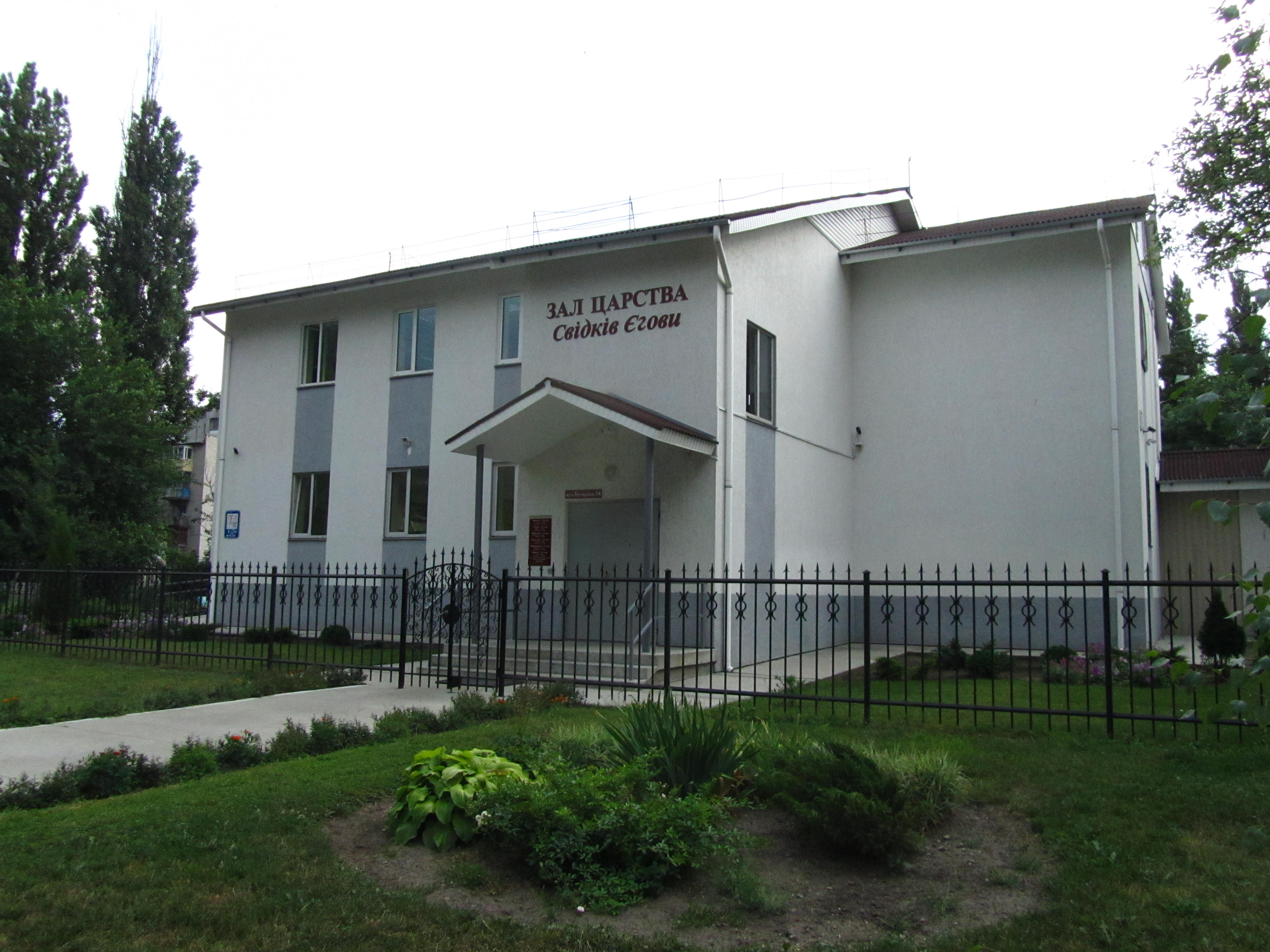
Kingdom Hall of Jehovah's Witnesses

St. Nicholas Church

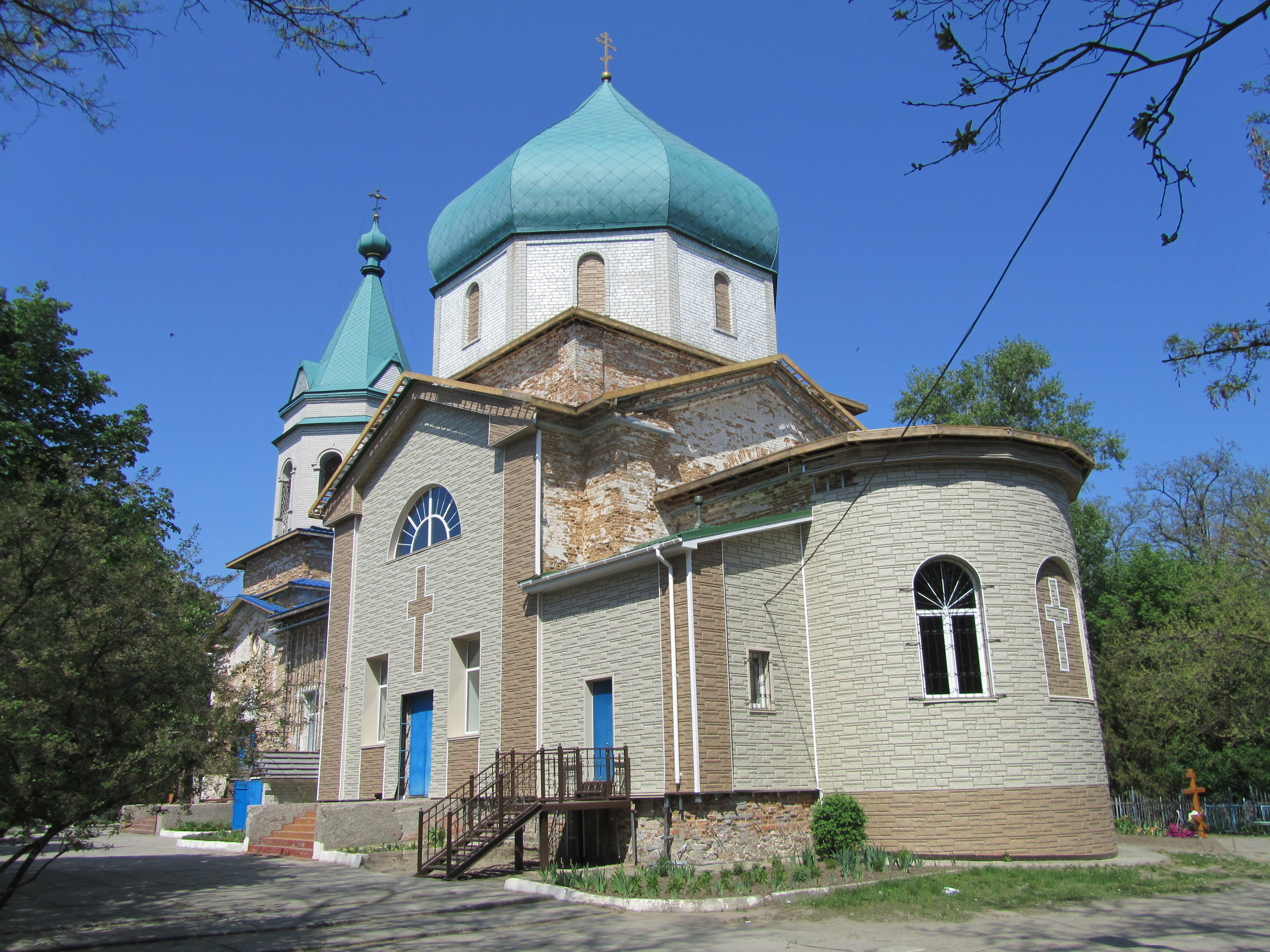
Church of the Assumption of Our Lady

Source of Life Church

Church of Seventh-Day Adventist Christians

Kremenchuk's residents belong to the religious traditions of the Ukrainian Orthodox Church – Kyiv Patriarchate and historically Judaism. There are also smaller communities of Protestants such as Baptists, Seventh-day Adventists, and Jehovah's Witnesses, Roman Catholics, and Islam.

Today, most of Kremenchuk belongs to the Orthodox Christian Church, specifically the UOC-KP branch, which has been administered under the Kremenchuk and Lubny Eparchy since 2007 after it was split off from the Poltava Eparchy, which was combined with Myrhorod's instead. The current diocesan bishop is Metropolitan Mykolai (Kapustin). The main church of the eparchy is the Church of the Assumption of Our Lady in the city, which was the only church to have survived post-World War II. During the Soviet-era, many of the Orthodox churches were closed as repressions began, as many of the clergy in Kremenchuk opposed both the Living Church movement that was initially supported by the Soviets and the Ukrainian Autocephalous Orthodox Church, although a Renovationist eparchy did exist until 1934 in the city. The churches were revived partially during German occupation as part of the Ukrainian Autonomous Orthodox Church under Veniamin (Novytsky), although after the Soviets regained power, they destroyed the last large church, the Assumption Cathedral, and began another wave of oppressions. After Ukrainian independence, St. Nicholas Cathedral, which was formerly a Roman Catholic church, became part of the Ukrainian Autocephalous Orthodox Church and later the UOC-KP, and was thus the UOC-KP's largest church in Poltava Oblast throughout the 1990s. (Note: The eparchial centre in Poltava was only established in 2002.) There are also smaller communities of other Christian denominations. The Roman Catholics started having a presence in the city due to Polish immigrants, who built the St. Nicholas Church in 1910, although it was soon after closed, and it would take until 2003 for another Roman Catholic parish to be opened under the name St. Joseph's. The following year, a Ukrainian Greek Catholic church was also opened, known as the Resurrection parish. Kremenchuk has had a community of evangelical Christians since at least the late 1800s, when they were prosecuted by the authorities, with some even being sent to Siberia, with the worst persecution being against Pentecostals. A secret prayer house stood on Chkalova Street, although it is no longer in use.

Historically, the city also had a large Jewish community, which first settled in 1780 in the city. By 1801, there were around 500 Jews in the city, and they even had their own hospital, property, and street at the time. In 1809, a school-factory was opened to bring in Jews who were impoverished because Kremenchuk already had a fairly large Jewish community, which succeeded in its goal but due to very poor working conditions and intervention by the kahal, the factory was closed by 1817. For a brief seven-month period, from 1812 to 1813, Rebbe Dovber Schneuri fled to the city, briefly making it the center of the Chabad movement before he relocated to Lyubavichi in 1813. By the late 1800s, in 1897, the Jewish community comprised 47% of the city, with Hovevei Zion, Chernobyl (Hasidic dynasty), and Chabad movements being active in the city. The Jewish community, which by then had 60 synagogues in the city, faced regular pogroms in the 1900s-10s, although the community still continued to grow to a peak of nearly 50% of the population in 1926, until it tapered off by the start of World War II to 22.2%. Occupying German forces during the Holocaust systematically massacred the Jewish population as part of the Holocaust during this time, with only some 5,500 (6.4%) of the Jewish population remaining by 1959. By 1990, during independence, there was only one synagogue in the city, as many Jews left as part of aliyah to Israel and Western European countries. However, the Jewish community left in Kremenchuk still continues to function, with roughly 3,000 Jews remaining in the city. Lastly, the city has also had a minor Muslim community, who have a mosque at the former Chkalova Street and who regularly host collective prayers.

== Culture ==
=== Attractions ===
Peace Park in Kremenchuk with the Gong of Peace in the background.

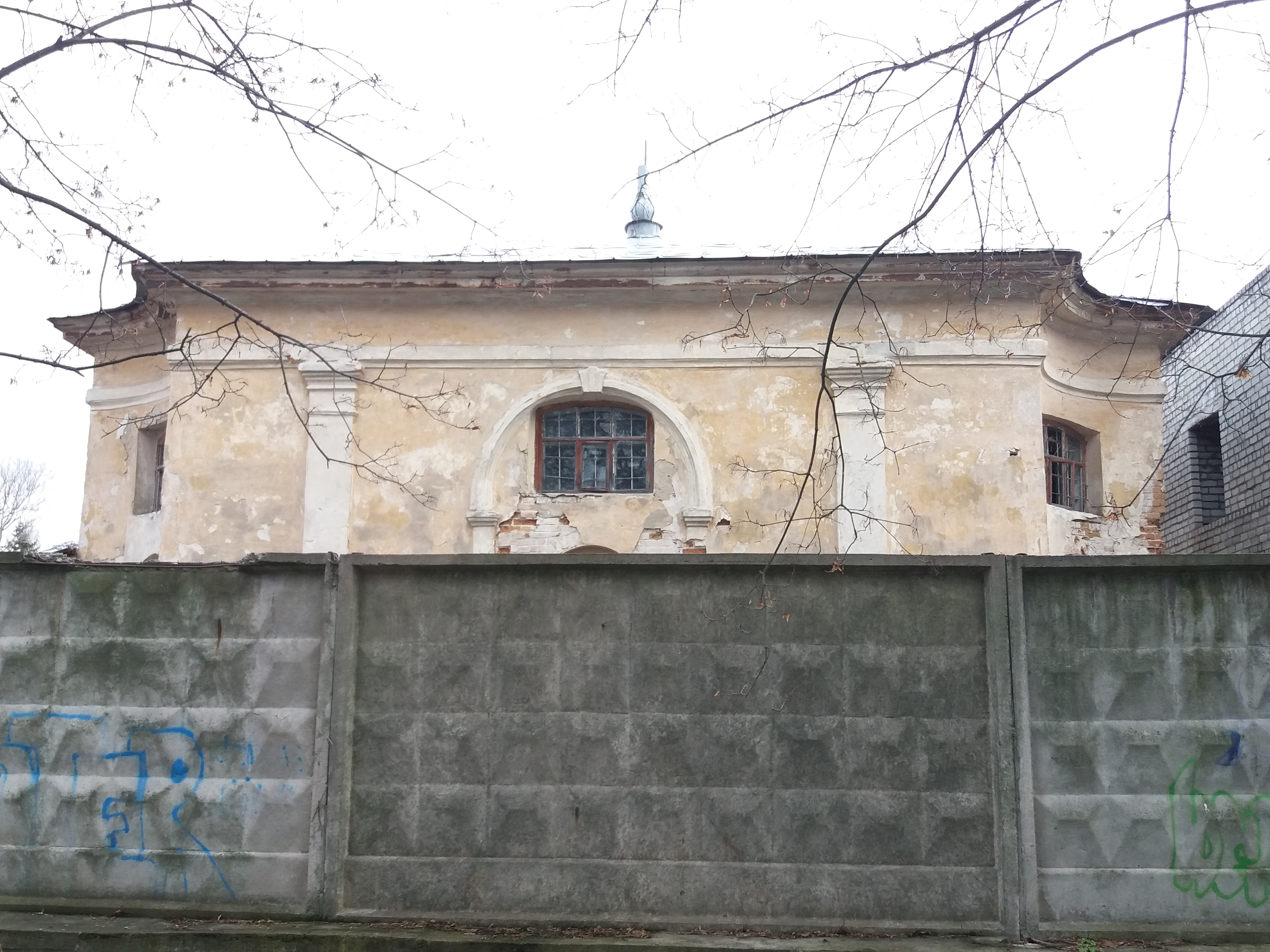
The oldest building in the city, the Stone Tower (House for Observing the Movement of Ships on the Dnieper), which was built in the late 1700s.

The Kremenchuk Commissariat Commission, which is located in Kriukiv.

There are multiple parks in the city, such as Peace Park, which was dedicated to the liberation of Kremenchuk from the Nazis in 1983. The park is around 10 hectares and has a memorial complex to honour military units during World War II and the Alley of Labour Heroes that commemorates those who rebuilt the city and worked at enterprises. It is also the site of the military museum that is open-air. The museum has a MiG-23, a T-64 tank, and a Katyusha rocket launcher on display, among other objects. The park is also the site of the Gong of Peace, which was installed with the help of the Indonesian government in 2003 to honour the 2002 Bali bombings, with the city being chosen for the project because of the number of losses during World War Two and its participation in sister city projects. In addition to the memorials at Peace Park, there are also many other war memorials, such as the Warrior-Liberator monument and "Forever Living". The Warrior-Liberator monument is located at Oleh Babiev Square and commemorates the first Soviet flag raise over Kremenchuk in 1943, which was above the House of Print building. It was unveiled in 1951, and was produced by the Kharkiv sculptural combine to stand 6 metres high. "Forever Living" is also another prominent war complex, which consists of an eternal flame and a "Book of Memory" that lists the names of every individual who died in the city during World War II. The last prominent war memorial is the monument to the sailors of the Dnipro Military Flotilla, which is located near Kriukiv Bridge and is a sculpture of two sailors with a rifle and machine gun, who fought in August 1919 against advancing White forces. The monument was created in 1938, although it was destroyed by German forces and had to be reproduced in 1945 and again in 1985.

The oldest surviving building in the city is the Stone Tower, which was created between 1783 and 1787 as part of the former provincial administrative building during the time Kremenchuk was the capital of Novorossiya. The tower was part of a matching set, as documented by a drawing dated to Catherine II's visit in 1787 that is now held at the Hermitage Museum. After Kremenchuk was demoted, the stone towers were repurposed as storehouses for the Black Sea Admiralty. By the late 1800s the rest of the administrative building, which had gone into decay, was demolished, including one of the stone towers leaving just a singular tower remaining of the complex. The tower was used for the reserve cavalry inspector, then as a library, and then as a hospital, and was later designated an architectural monument of national significance in 1979. In addition to the building, another historical building is the Kriukiv Quartermaster Warehouse Ensemble, which was built for Kriukiv's commissariat. It consists of 22 buildings on around 6 hectares. As with the stone tower, it was repurposed after 1863 as a clothing warehouse until 2005, when it was shut down and used as a tourist site, although only Ukrainian citizens were allowed as foreign citizens were barred from entry.

=== Performing arts ===
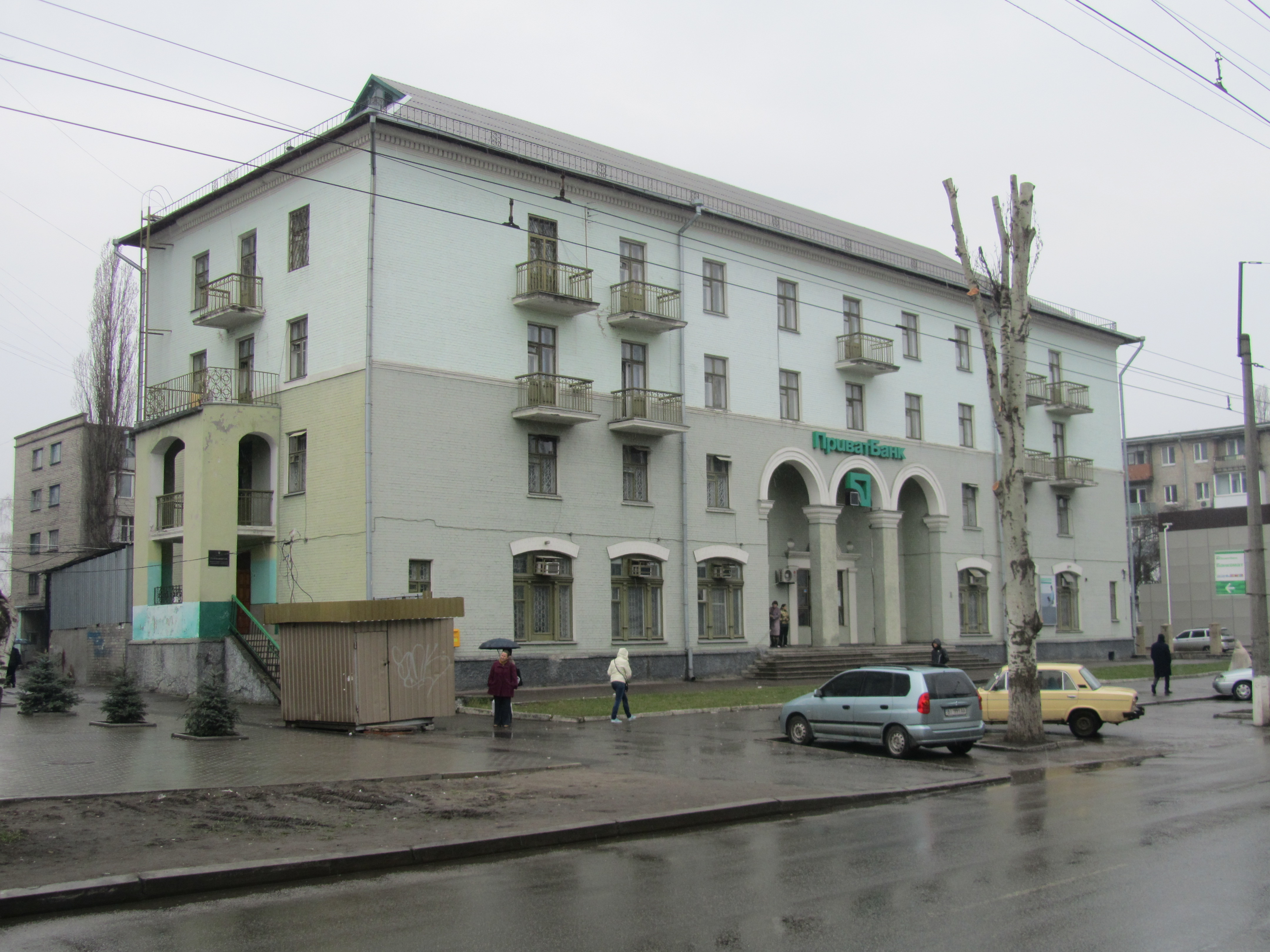
The premises of the MO Comedy Theatre, which was formerly used by the Technical School of Railway Transport.

The only surviving theatre in Kremenchuk is the MO Comedy Theatre, which was itself formed from the student theatrical club "Askal" that played at the City Palace of Culture before disbanding in 2015. In 2017, it was announced that the theatre had secured a permanent venue at the former dormitory building of the Technical School of Railway Transport, which was then being used as an office of PrivatBank, and that the building would be converted to seat 60. The theatre was opened in January 2018.

However, the city did have a major historical theatre presence, with the first theatre in the city being recorded in 1810 and was noted for having performances by Mikhail Shchepkin in the 1820s and a troupe under G. Stein. Another theatre was opened in 1876 under the initiative of P. Kozelsky, who helped convert a hotel to a theatre that seated 550 people. Under entrepreneur N. Flippovsky, the theatre flourished, holding performances by Marko Kropyvnytskyi, and performances were held four times weekly. In the late 1800s, the theatre in Kremenchuk helped in the revival of Ukrainian-language performances, and the theatre was also able to do guest performances in Kharkiv and Kyiv. Another theatre was opened in addition to the old one during this time, known as the Pushkin People's Auditorium, although it became mostly known as the site of lectures and protests, ultimately being closed by 1905. After this, the theatre scene fell off for some time, especially after the Russian Civil War, until 1922 when the city architect reconstructed the theatre to seat 800. The theatre scene then re-flourished with Russian, Ukrainian, and Yiddish performances during the interwar period. World War II destroyed the scene again, and it would not recover during the rest of the Soviet era. Attempts were made prior to the opening of the MO theatre for a new theatre as early as 2008, which was backed by the then-mayor and oblast governor, with proposals to use the site of the former Dnipro cinema in Pioneer Square. Around 20 million hryvnias was given in funding for the project, but it eventually stalled for some time, until talks were revived in 2012 to transform the former Palace of Culture of KrAZ into a theatre, although nothing came of this either because the KrAZ theatre was badly damaged. Despite this, some troupes still continued in the city, like the Kremenchuk Troitsky Theatre, which staged some full-length productions.

=== Museums ===
Kremenchuk Museum of Local Lore

Uniforms on display at the All-Ukrainian Museum of the History of Uniforms.

Kremenchuk is home to seven museums: the Kremenchuk Museum of Local Lore, the All-Ukrainian Museum of the History of Uniforms, the Military History Museum, the Museum of the History of Aviation, the Anton Makarenko Memorial Museum, the City Art Gallery, and the Natalia Yuzefovych Art Gallery. The museum of local lore is the city's main museum, and was founded in 1937 in a converted synagogue, but most of its material was looted by Germans during World War II. The destroyed museum was revived in 1966 and moved to a building from 1916, officially opening in 1975, and currently holds more than 63,000 items, including a large paleontological collection. There are 11 halls, including ones for paleontology, archeology, the 19th-20th centuries, World War II, and concentration camps. The uniform museum was formed in the summer of 2017 via private initiative with support from the Ukrainian Union of Naval Infantry Veterans and ExPostBoxes, and was initially just an exhibition at the also-recently founded Museum of Military History and "ATO Museum" at VPU 7. However, most of the items were looted in early 2019, stalling plans for a physical opening, and the museum withdrew its exhibitions. In 2020, it was announced that the museum had found a physical premise and had around 8,000 items, although nothing ever came of this and the museum still has no physical premises and instead holds exhibits. The military history museum was founded together with the museum about uniforms as one of its branches, and has around 2,000 items, with a special collection on the history of military medicine. It also in 2018 opened up the Kriukiv quartermaster warehouses up to the public to start a walking tour about the fortress in Kremenchuk.

The aviation museum was initially opened up in May 2014 in the basement of building No. 57-A, and it primarily covers the city's aviation history, specifically around World War II, such as Operation Frantic. The museum has since acquired materials related to the Russian invasion, such as the wreckage of a Russian Ilyushin Il-76 and a scale model of the destroyed Antonov An-225 Mriya. The museum dedicated to Anton Makarenko is about Makarenko, a prominent educational theorist, being housed in the building where Makarenko's parents lived and where he also lived briefly. In 2008, due to the disrepair of the original house, there were discussions about moving most of the exhibits from the house to a new building, but this was canceled in favour of a renovation of the original house that was completed in 2011. The museum holds around 34,000 items. The last two art museums are related, with the City Art Gallery being the main museum opened in 1998, and primarily houses local and national Ukrainian artists, while the Yuzefovych museum was an exhibition of the City Art Gallery before being moved into a separate venue.

=== Sports ===
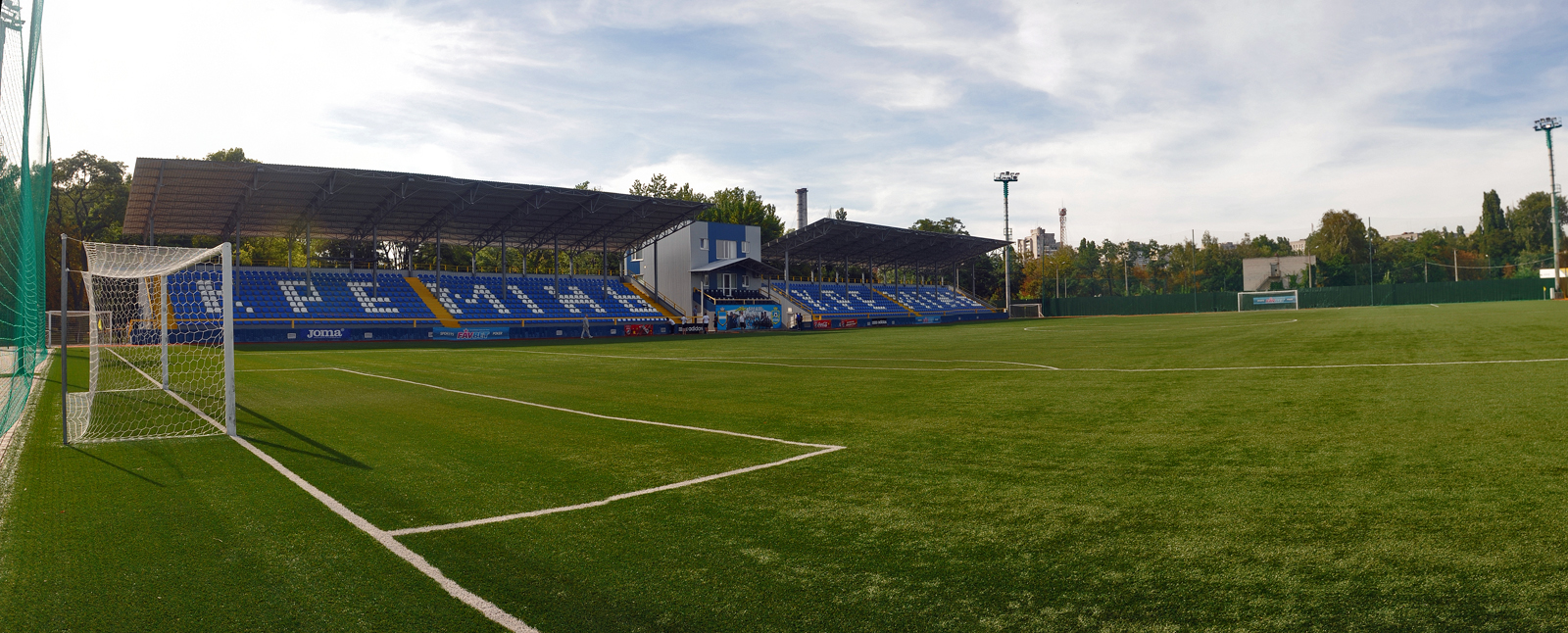
Kremin-Stadium in Kremenchuk

In terms of football, Kremenchuk is home to the FC Kremin Kremenchuk team, which was set to play in the Ukrainian Second League after being relegated from the First League during the 2024–25 Ukrainian First League, although they ultimately temporarily withdrew from active play and suspended operations after their relegation. Kremin was founded in 1959, originally as Dnipro with the support of the road machines plant, then known as Dormash, although this is also disputed as some consider the founding of Kremin to be the founding of another football club representing KrAZ in 1948. Two other football clubs existed alongside it at the time, Avtozavod's Torpedo and Kriukiv's Avanhard. Regardless, Kremin played in the Poltava Oblast Football Championship, and in the Class B section of the Soviet Football Championship in 1963, although in the latter as a combined team with players coming from Avanhard and Torpedo also. The team would then play in the Football Championship of the Ukrainian SSR in both Class A and B, before being disbanded in 1970, although a rump SK KrAZ continued to play at the oblast level. Kremin was refounded in the spring of 1986, combining Naftovyk (which played for the Kremenchuk Oil Refinery) and SK KrAZ. The peak of the club was in 1988, when they won the all-Union amateur championship. After the fall of the Soviet Union, Kremin initially played in the Ukrainian Premier League, before eventually being demoted all the way down to the Second League, before folding initially in 2000 and then being refounded in 2003.

Other notable football clubs in the city have included, at various times FC Naftokhimik Kremenchuk (which has won the oblast championship and oblast cup in the early 1990s), FC Adoms Kremenchuk (which played from 1999 to 2001 in the Second League), FC Vahonobudivnyk Kremenchuk (which plays in Kriukiv based on Avanhard), and FC Kremez Kremenchuk (which played from 2000 to 2003). The most prominent non-football team is the ice hockey club HC Kremenchuk, which plays in the Ukrainian Championship at its own facility, Aisberg Arena. Aisberg was reconstructed in 2017, which led the team to temporarily play in Brovary. HC Kremenchuk won the Ukrainian Championship twice, the first time being in 2019-20 against HC Donbass and the second time in 2024-25 against HC Kyiv Capitals. The team also played internationally once at the 2015–16 IIHF Continental Cup, when it represented Ukraine after championship winners ATEK Kyiv declined, placing last in Group E and was thus eliminated. In addition, the city has hosted amateur futsal clubs in a raion-wide championship and has beach football competitions, in the latter case being a founding member in Ukraine for the championship under the team "Lada" at the inaugural championship in Sevastopol.

The city has multiple stadiums such as the Polytechnic Stadium, Kredmash Stadium, and Kremin-Arena, among others. The latter, Kremin-Arena, was discussed as early as June 2007 for a proposed separate stadium solely for the football team, which would be designed to meet Second League requirements and seat 1,500 people at 2.5 million hryvnias. The stadium, which was set to be located in the City Garden, remained unfinished into 2010 due to funding issues, although it was located completed and named after mayor Oleh Babiev. It currently meets UAF's Category 2 criteria. Kredmash is the older, original stadium, which was built by the road machinery plant in 1928 as Dynamo and is currently owned by Avanhard Sports School. It has been under proposed reconstruction since 2017.

=== City symbols ===
==== Coat of arms ====
A coat of arms for the city has existed since 1798, when the original coat was approved by Paul I, which had a majority blue-coloured shield except for a silver stripe standing for the Dnieper. There was then an attempt made in 1866 to slightly modify the coat of arms to add the coat of arms of the Poltava Governorate and a ribbon, but this was not approved. It was finally dramatically altered in 1971 under the Soviets, who added a background of red (for the establishment of Soviet power), a hammer and sickle, and a gear at the top. The inside shield was also changed to have a solely blue background with three stripes on the left and right alongside a bridge for the Dnieper. After independence, the Ukrainians revised the coat of arms again in 1995 to be based on the original 1798 coat with the blue and white shield. The only addition was a golden decorative border and a silver crown on top.

==== Flag ====
The flag of Kremenchuk, which was approved alongside the coat of arms in 1995, is a square of blue, white, and blue in a 2 to 1 to 2 ratio.

Coat of arms of Kremenchuk

Flag of Kremenchuk

== Economy ==
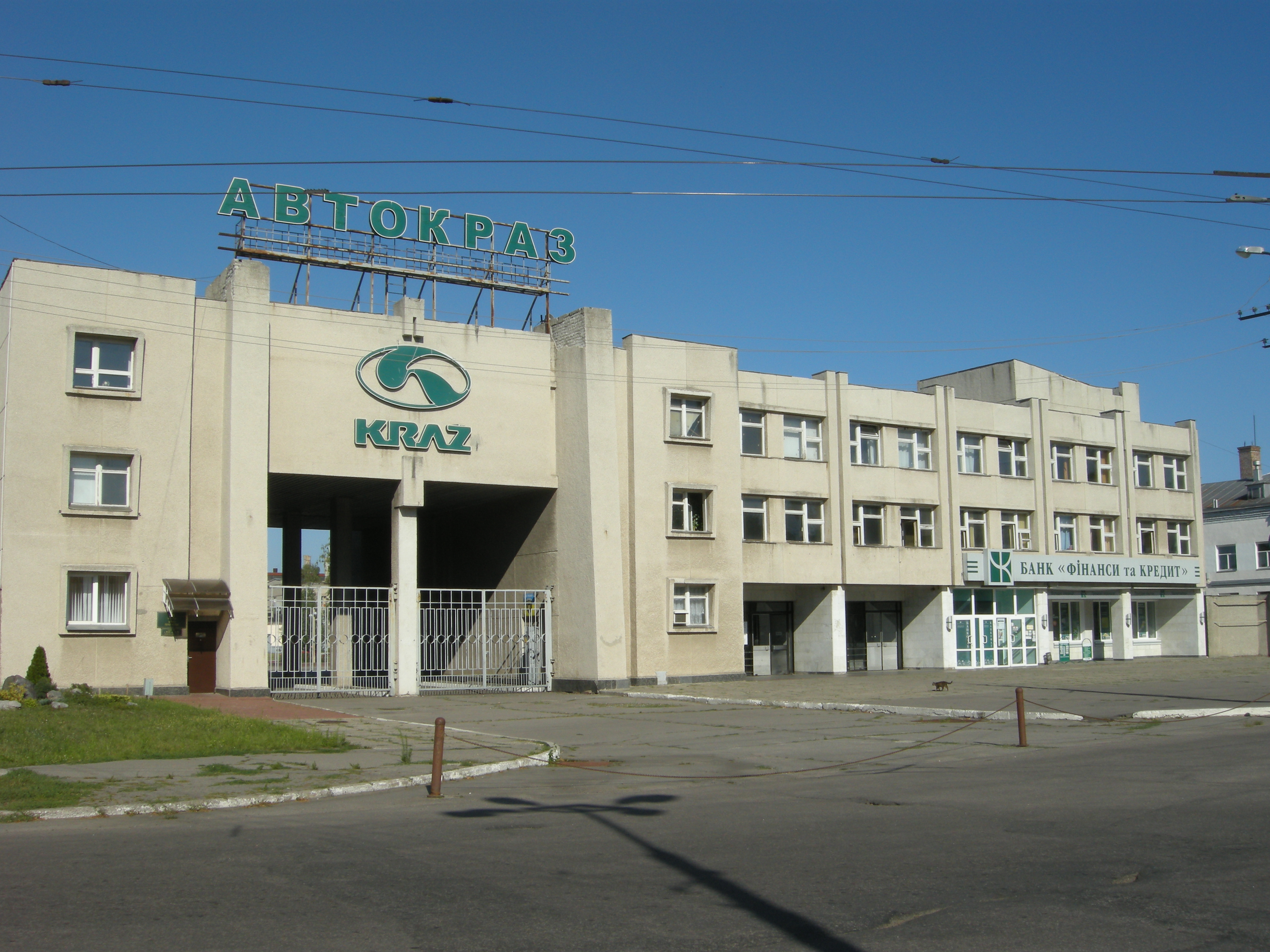
KrAZ automobile plant

Kremenchuk is the economic center of the Poltava Oblast and one of the leading industrial centers of Ukraine. The economy of the city is primarily based around machine-building, metalworking, and oil refining. Historically, the city served as a major trading centre on the Dnieper, and a major enterprise in the city was Kryukiv Railway Car Building Works in Kriukiv, although this has shifted away towards KrAZ, a truck-manufacturing company, and the Kremenchuk Oil Refinery. As of the 2010s, the city has eighty-nine enterprises that are classified as major, alongside an additional 14,000 other more minor enterprises.

The city's biggest enterprise is KrAZ, which is one of the largest heavy-truck manufacturers in Europe. Unlike many other large enterprises in the cities of Ukraine since its independence, KrAZ did not shut down and collapse, although it has seen a decline in output. Another large enterprise in the city was Ukrtatnafta, which operated the Kremenchuk Oil Refinery, with the products there being used for diesel fuel and unleaded gasoline. The oil refinery operated by Ukrtatnafta was the only oil refinery in Ukraine post-2012, following the closure of the Lysychansk Oil Refinery. However, the role of the industry in the city's economy collapsed post-2022, when Russian strikes destroyed the refinery in April 2022, with Dmytro Lunin calling the refinery "completely destroyed". On the right bank in Kriukiv is the historically important enterprise, Kryukiv Railway Car Building Works. The company has built freight and passenger railcars since 1869, originally for the railway line from Kharkiv to Mykolaiv, although now this has shifted towards supplying equipment primarily for Ukrzaliznytsia.

Other smaller large industrial enterprises in the city include the Kremenchuk Wheel Plant, which produced wheels for machinery and automobiles, the Kremenchuk Road Machines Plant, which specialises in asphalt concrete and bitumen, the Automobile Assembly Plant, which assembles cars for Chinese and South Korean Companies, around 15,000 annually, and the steel foundry, which produces castings for railcars. There is also light industries in the city, including a plant for tobacco (JTI), confectionery (Roshen), a knitting factory as well as milk and meat processing plants. The meat-processing plant is known as "Kremenchukmiaso" and produces around 200 varieties of meat, while the milk plant processes around 150 tonnes of milk daily.

== Education ==
=== Higher education ===
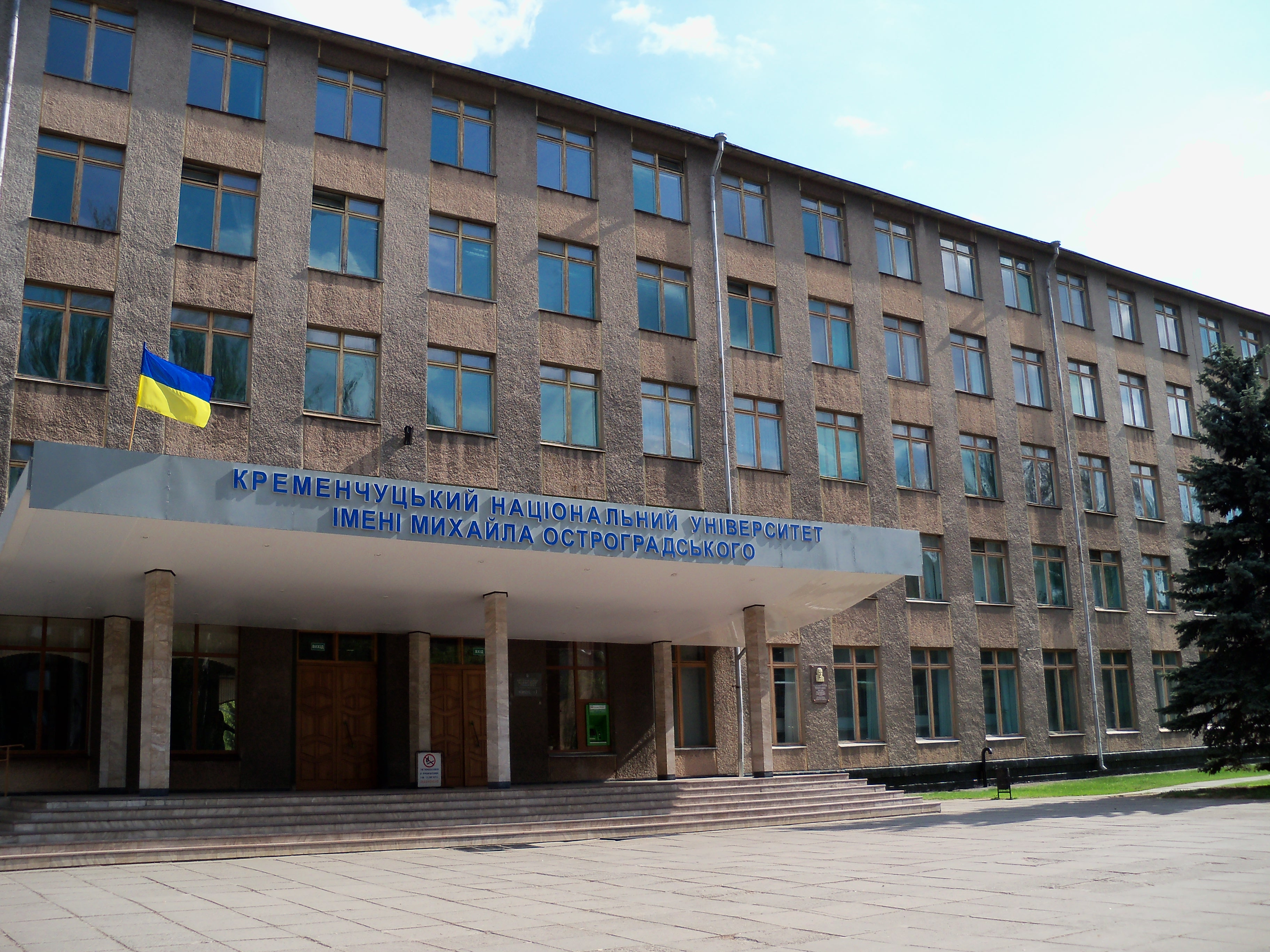
The city's main university, Kremenchuk National University.

Kremenchuk has multiple institutions of higher education. The universities are: Kremenchuk National University, Kremenchuk Institute of Alfred Nobel University, Kremenchuk University of Economics, Information, Technology, and Management, Kremenchuk College of Transport Infrastructure, Kremenchuk Flight College, Kremenchuk Medical College, Kremenchuk School of Railway Transport, and the Kremenchuk Humanitarian and Technological Academy. The most important institution in the city is Kremenchuk National University, which was founded in 1921 and is ranked seventh in the central region of Ukraine and 41st nationally. The railway school is the oldest school in the city, having been founded in 1878 as the Kremenchuk Technical School for the staff of the Kharkiv to Mykolaiv railway. The medical college was established in 1904 and renamed the Kremenchuk Medical School in 1954 before again switching to the title of college in 2004, and has around 1,000 students. The pedagogical college was originally located in Lokhvytsia starting in 1932, before relocating to Kremenchuk in 1969, and as of 2016 was the first institution of its kind within the nation to award a bachelor's degree over a specialist qualification. For the last two, Alfred Nobel and the Flight College, the former opened up in 1998 as a subdivision of the main university in Dnipro although it shifted away in 2022 when it started restructuring to become an Interregional Academy of Personnel Management, while the latter flight college operated also as a subdivision of the Kharkiv National University of Internal Affairs and trains cadets.

=== Secondary education ===
As of 2019-2020, the number of secondary schools in the city includes ten lyceums, five gymnasiums, two education complexes, and thirteen general secondary schools (the latter, general secondary schools, were all due to be moved at the end of 2019 to gymnasium status). All the secondary schools in Kremenchuk are specialised starting from the 10th grade, such as mathematical, biological and chemical, information and mathematics, and information and technology, among others. One school, School No. 13, is for distance education or as an evening school in person. As of the beginning of 2012, in total, there were 18,000 students enrolled in schools in Kremenchuk, although only 10,000 of them are actually secondary students.

=== Public libraries ===
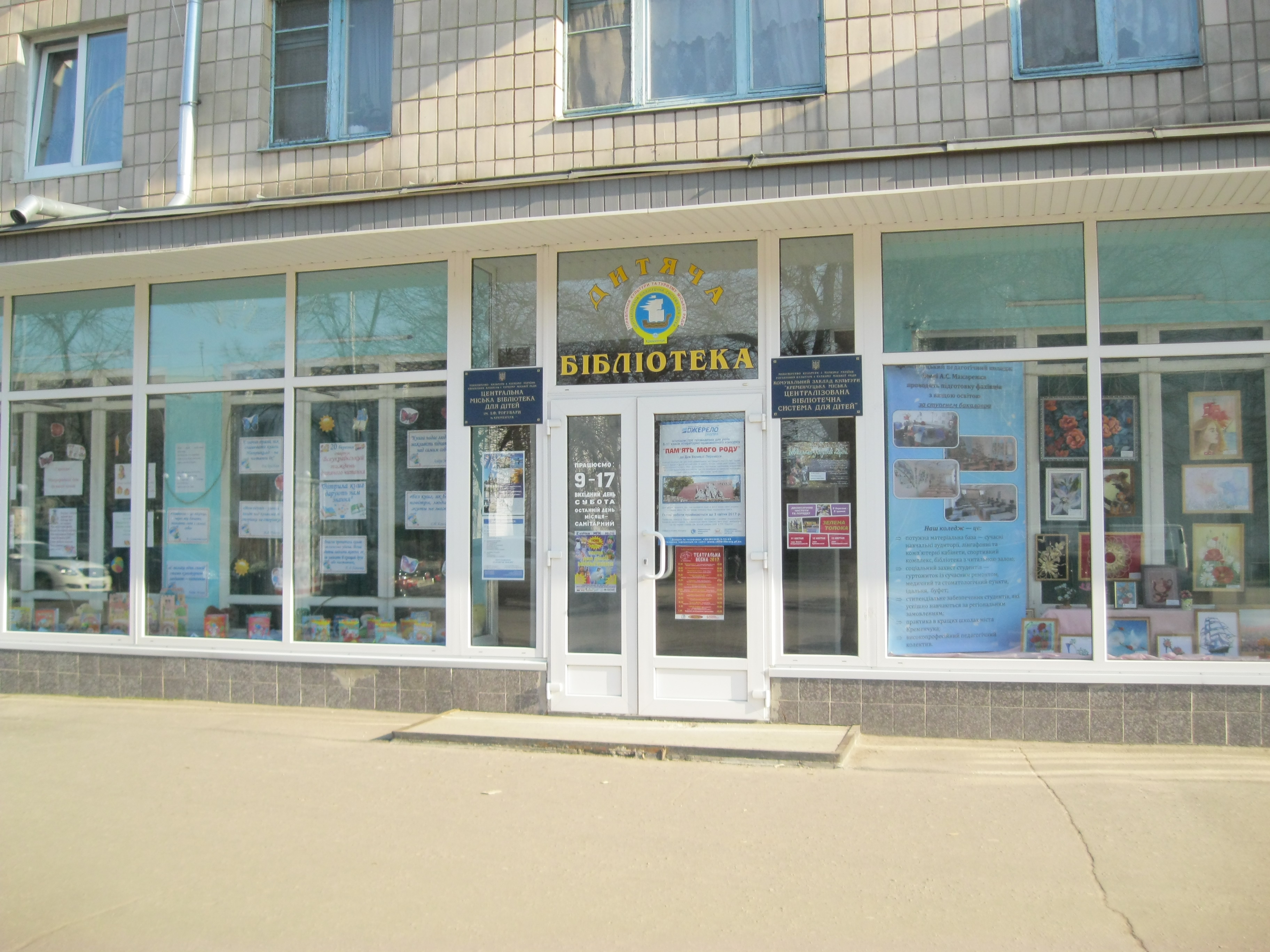
The main library for the children.

There are two centralised library systems, one for adults and one for children, with 20 branches of libraries across the two. However, 10 branches were closed in 2021, which was cited as being due to a decrease in readers as part of reorganisation. The main library for adults is the Kremenchuk City Library named after Gorky, although this was also renamed to just the Kremenchuk City Public Library, was established in 1893 after the establishment of multiple reading rooms. The library's inventory was partially destroyed during World War II, although after donations from residents and the city of Ivanovo, the library gradually recovered, and it still regularly hosts literary events.

== Infrastructure ==
=== Transportation ===
==== Local transportation ====
===== Trolleybuses =====
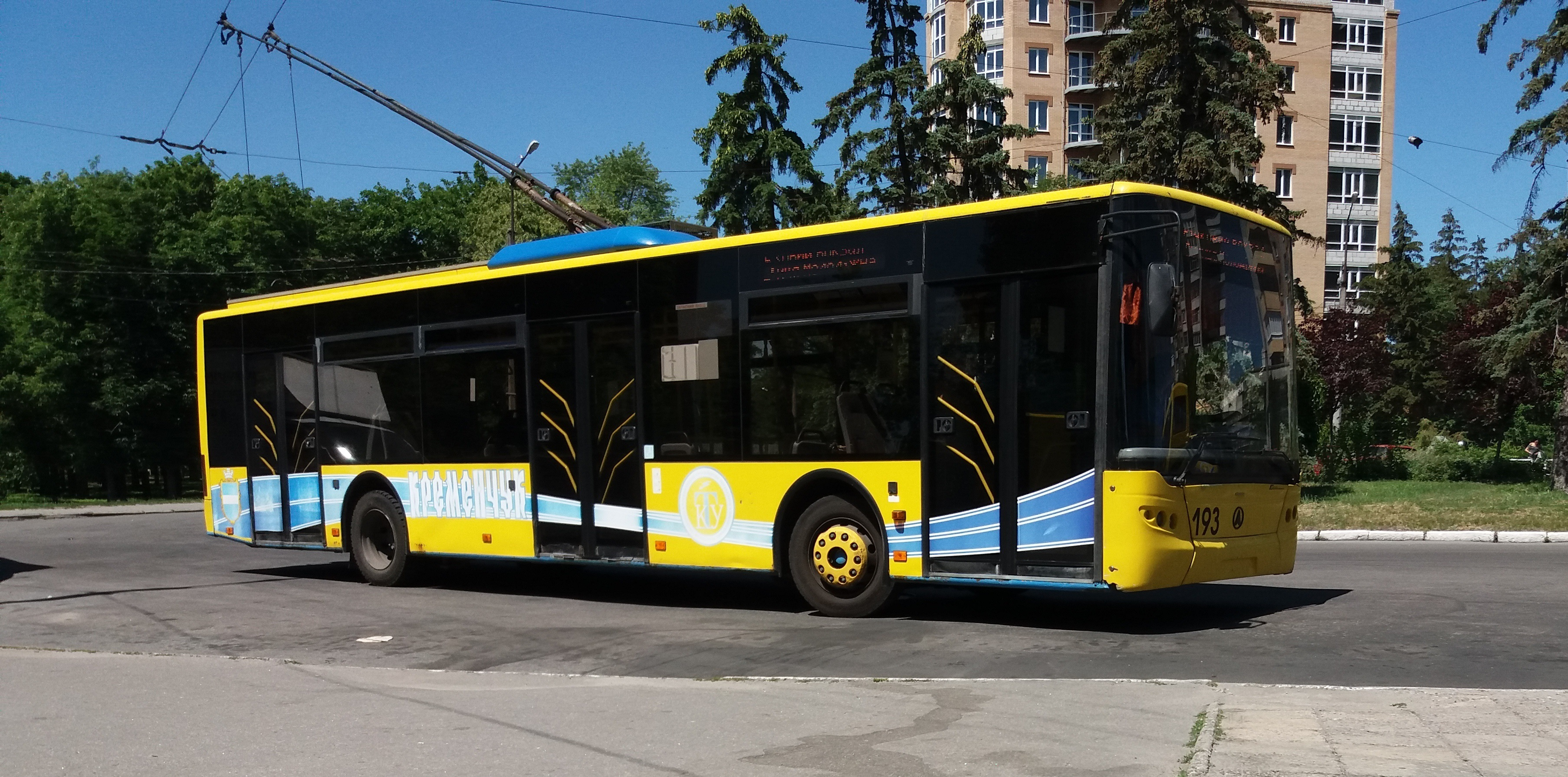
A LAZ E183 trolleybus in Kremenchuk.

Map of trolleybus routes in Kremenchuk, 2020.

Kremenchuk has a trolleybus system, which is operated by KP "Kremenchuk Trolleybus Administration (KTU). The system has existed since 6 November 1966, when a route was ran from the River Station to the Power Station on a Kyiv-4. Over the years, the routes have expanded, with newer fleets since the 2010s. By May 2024, the fleet consisted of 73 trolleybuses, of which 21 were battery trolleybuses (these are all on the plus/+ routes), of which the oldest running, non-retired trolleybus was from 2008.

Originally, most of the trolleybuses were from the Soviet era and were ZiU-682 or YMZ-T1 or 2, but by the early 2010s most of these were retired. The fleet was then initially replaced with 13 new LAZ buses in 2013, although some have since retired, with mostly only the newer LAZ buses built post-2012 remaining with the expection of one serial numbered 94, which is from 2008. In September 2017, the city signed a contract financed by the European Bank for Reconstruction and Development. This contract gave the city 35 single Bogdan T70117 trolleybuses, alongside 5 articulated Bogdan Т90117 trolleybuses, which were built in the assembly plant of Bogdan Motors in Lutsk. The T90117s, in particular, could seat up to 200. The city then moved to autonomous trolleybuses beginning in January 2020 under another EBRD credit, which modified the Bogdan buses to go off the networks with batteries on the plus routes. That year, the system also received eight new AKSM-32100D trolleybuses from BKM-Ukraine, mostly to be used on the Kryukiv bridge. This was also the time fares significantly rose, as originally in October 2019 the fare was the lowest of any trolleybus system in Ukraine at 2 hryvnias. During the Russian invasion of Ukraine, at the start, some of the routes were temporarily suspended, such as 3B, which was suspended for almost a year after the start, and also reduced routes began. However, most routes eventually returned, although some alternative routes, like the variations of route no. 3, did not, and during this time, some of the buses were retrofitted with batteries by Politekhnoservis because of the unreliability of the electrical grid due to missiles. In 2024, the city further signed a tender with the European Investment Bank for 20 more battery trolleybuses, which is part of the wider "Urban Public Transport of Ukraine II" project. This was eventually fulfilled with 18 PTS T12309 buses arriving in November 2025 and throughout 2026.

====== Current routes ======
As of 2026, the city operates seventeen different routes for trolleybuses:

- Route No. 1: Wheel Plant to River Station (8.18 km)
- Route No. 1+: Kvartal 304 to River Station (9.82 km)
- Route No. 1+ (Alternative): Oleksiy Dreval Street to River Station (11.44 km)
- Route No. 2: River Station to Ukrtatnafta (15.54 km)
- Route No. 3B: Kryukiv Bridge to Molodizhna Street (11.29 km)
- Route No. 5: River Station to Molodizhna Street (12.23 km)
- Route No. 5A+: River Station to Kokhnivskyi Bread Factory (11.2 km)
- Route No. 6: Wheel Plant to Ukrtatnafta (12.15 km)
- Route No. 6A+: Kvartal 304 to Ukrtatnafta (13.77 km)
- Route No. 7: River Station to Potoky village (20.38 km)
- Route No. 11A+: River Station to Kvartal 297 (13.25 km)
- Route No. 15B+: River Station to Molodizhna Street (via Serzhanta Melnychuka Street, 15.07 km)
- Route No. 17A+: Yuriy Kondratyuk Street to Molodizhna Street (17.31 km)
- Route No. 18A+: Kryukiv Bridge to Molodizhna Street (via 1st City Hospital, 13.81 km)
- Route No. 26A+: Akademika Herasymovycha Street to Molodizhna Street (18.84 km)
- Route No. 26A+ (Refinery route): Akademika Herasymovycha Street to Ukrtatnafta (22.15 km)
- Route No. 28A+: Molodizhna Street to Davyda Kostrova Street (15.88 km)

===== City buses =====
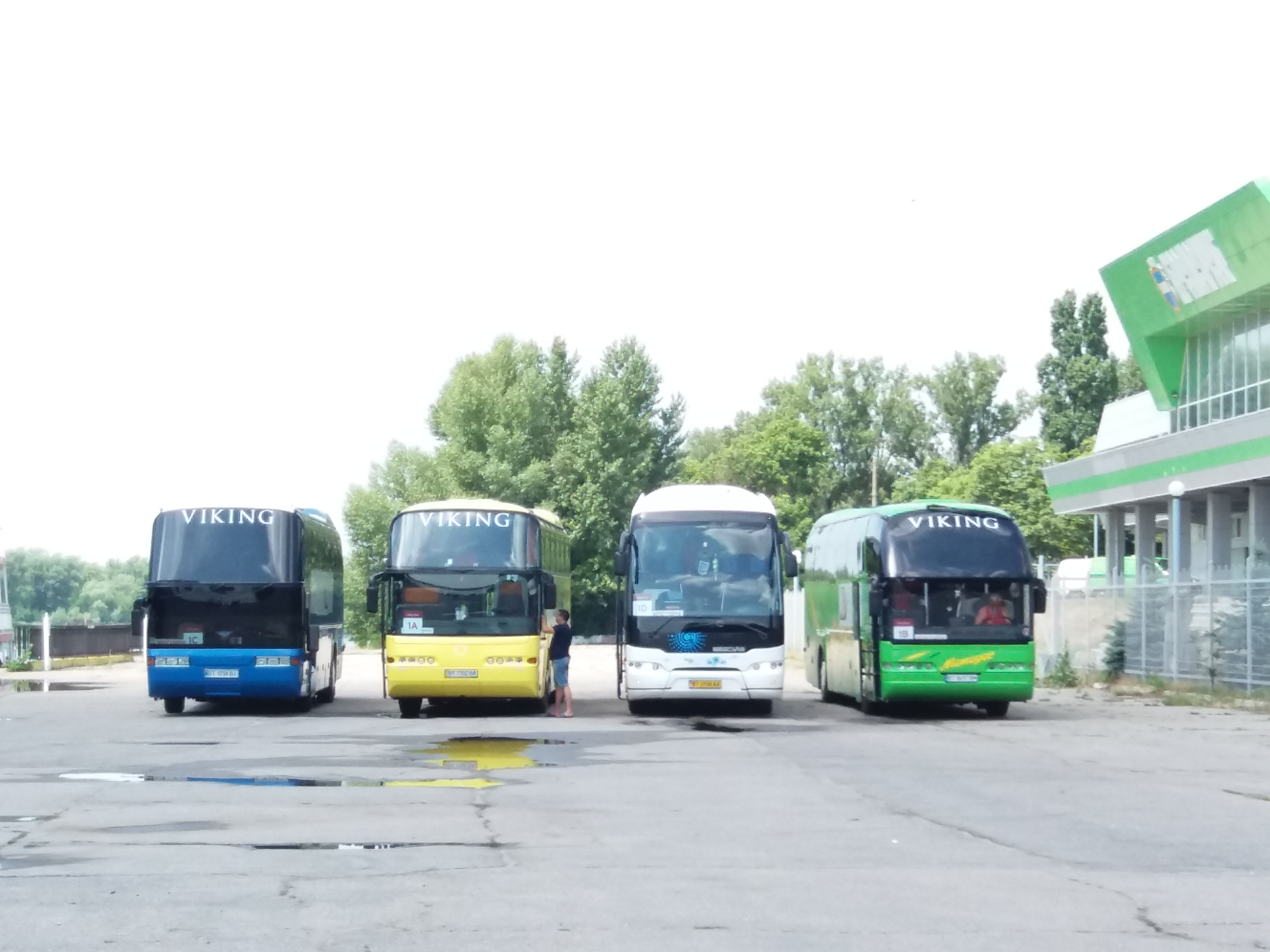
City buses near the River Station (used by the Viking cruiseline).

Kremenchuk has both suburban city buses and intercity bus service alongside Marshrutkas operating within the city, with the central bus station being located at st. Vorovskogo, 32/6. Although primarily reliant on older buses, there are some newer buses on the city bus routes due to donations, such as Iveco Buses that seat 120 that were donated by Milan.

====== Current routes ======
As of 2026, the city operates thirteen different routes for city buses:

- Route No. 1: Central Market to Yuriy Kondratyuk Street (operated by PE "Eurotrans Service", 7.19 km)
- Route No. 2: Heavenly Hundred Street to Pravoberezhna Street (operated by MKP Firm "Adella", 7.39 km)
- Route No. 3a: Auto Market to Kokhnivskyi Bread Factory (operated by LLC "Soyuz-Avto-Express", 12.2 km)
- Route No. 4: Akademika Herasymovycha Street to Pravoberezhna Street (operated by LLC "ATP-15307", 9.43 km)
- Route No. 4 (cemetery route): Pravoberezhna Street to Deivske Cemetery (operated by LLC "ATP-15307", 9.12 km)
- Route No. 10: Central Market to Ihor Sikorsky Street (operated by LLC "Avto-Komplekt", 9.72 km)
- Route No. 10a: River Station to Ihor Sikorsky Street (operated by MU "Kremenchuk Trolleybus Administration", either 10.1 km or 11.23 km (only on Saturdays))
- Route No. 12: Flight College to Solomiya Krushelnytska Street (operated by LLC "ATP-15307", 8.76 km)
- Route No. 13: Zonalnyi Lane to Michurina Street to Flight College (operated by LLC "ATP-15307", 9.54 km)
- Route No. 16: Oleksiy Dreval Street to Mykhailo Kotsyubynskyi Street (operated by PE "Kremin-Zovnishtransservice", 12.28 km)
- Route No. 25/25A+ (only on weekdays): Pravoberezhna Street to Ukrtatnafta (operated by MU "Kremenchuk Trolleybus Administration", 21.04 km)
- Route No. 25/25A+ (only on weekends): Pravoberezhna Street to Molodizhna Street (operated by MU "Kremenchuk Trolleybus Administration", 17.73 km)
- Route No. 117: Pridniprianske village to Molodizhna Street (operated by LLC "Soyuz-Avto-Express", 22.63 km)

===== Former trams =====
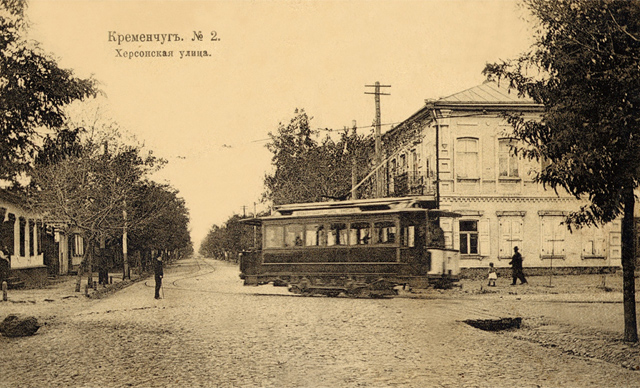
A tram in Kremenchuk, c. 1900

Kremenchuk used to have a tram system, which was one of the earliest in Ukraine, opening in 1899, only a few years after Kyiv Tram (1892, electric). The tram system was dual-owned, being governed primarily by the Belgian company "Kremenchuk Trams", itself part of Compagnie de Traction et d'Électricité, which was housed in Sclessin. In 1899, upon its opening, it had three single-track lines, although in 1906 the holding company was transferred to the "Belgian Anonymous Society of Trams and Electricity Utilisation". After this, the company also did some street lighting, and a specific line for freight, and by the end of 1916 had about 2.8 million passengers per year. However, during the Russian Civil War, the severe economic crisis forced the trams to shut down despite attempts by the Ukrainians to re-start it. In the 1920s, with no prospects, all the tram equipment was sold to Saratov, and it officially shut down in 1921.

==== Railways ====
The main Kremenchuk railway station.

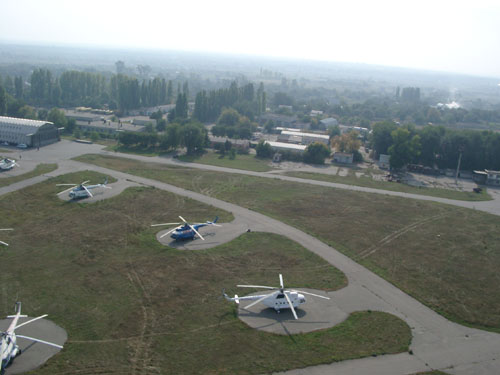
Kremenchuk Airport

Kremenchuk is a junction on the Southern Railways, which is part of Ukrzaliznytsia. The city has a few stations, with the main one being entitled Kremenchuk and the secondary one being on the right bank at Kryukiv, called Kryukiv-on-Dnipro. Short-distance, suburban routes include to Romodan, Hlobyne, Znamianka, and Poltava. Long-distance routes that go through or originate from Kremenchuk include to Kyiv, Kharkiv, Lviv, Odesa, Ternopil, Khmelnytskyi, Vinnytsia, and Mukachevo, among others. The city was also historically linked internationally via the Dnipro to St. Petersburg line, which ran all year, and the Moscow to Odesa line, which ran sometimes, but these have both been closed due to the war. Since 2008, the line from Kremenchuk to Korystivka (in Pryiutivka) has been electrified, with the line from Mala Pereshchepynska (in Prystantsiine) to Kremenchuk also being electrified since 2011.

The city has had a railway line since 1869, with the opening of the Kryukiv-on-Dnipro station for the Kharkiv to Mykolaiv line, although a line in Kremenchuk proper didn't begin until 1870 when a line began at the main railway station from Kharkiv to Kremenchuk as a terminus. The station was extensively used during the Russian Civil War, as it housed the command of the Southwestern Front that was occasionally visited by Joseph Stalin, although both the railway lines and the main station were destroyed by Russian forces during World War II. Both were rebuilt after the war, although the rebuilt main station was heavily altered, which happened again during major renovations in 2005.

==== Air transport ====
The city historically had four airfields, although they were mostly not for civilian use and were only used by the city's flight college. After independence, the only one that remained was the Kremenchuk Airport, which is a small airport as of 2013 that can only receive small aircraft, such as An-24s, Yak-40s, and some helicopters. There is also a small airport outside of the city's bounds in Potoky, which is owned by the city as of September 2005.

==== Roads and bridges ====
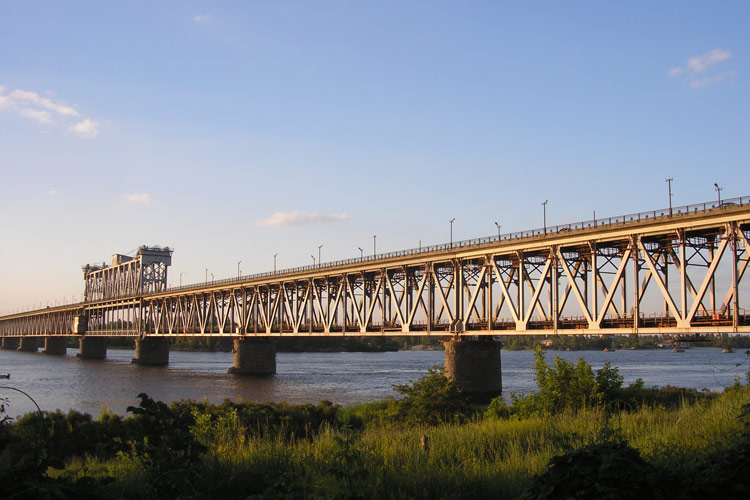
Bridge connecting Kremenchuk proper to Kryukiv.

The international European route, which goes from Poltava to Oleksandriia, crosses through the city. The Ukrainian international highway M22, which also runs from Poltava to Oleksandriia as it comprises the Ukrainian portion of E584, passes through the city. The closest national highway as part of the H-network is H08, which runs from Boryspil to Mariupol, which has a stop in Kremenchuk on the way to Zaporizhzhia from Dnipro. Another roads that passes through the city is the regional highway P10, which goes from Cherkasy to the city. In terms of the T-network, the territorial route, the city is also connected to T 1716, which has a total length of 88 km and connects Khorol to the city, and T 1711, which has a total length of 15.8 km and connects Sosnivka to Horishni Plavni with a stop in Kremenchuk. Repairs to city roads, primarily through asphalt, are done by the road repair municipal enterprise DRSU, which is funded through a budget allocation, along with some additional repairs done by the oblast agency of local roads in the most heavily trafficked areas of Kremenchuk to Manzheliia and Kremenchuk to Vlasivka. Despite these repairs, the road quality in general in the city has received frequent complaints, with little acknowledgment from the city council.

The main bridge of the city that connects the right-bank population of Kremenchuk to the left bank is the Kryukiv Bridge. The bridge was built in the aftermath of World War II as a replacement by Transmostproekt, and features two tiers for both automobile and rail traffic with a lifting mechanism, and as of 2011 handles around 3,000 cars a day. Extensive reconstruction of the bridge was done by Southern Railways in 1998 and 2007, with the latter costing 6.5 million hryvnias, in part due to constant deformation by overweight trucks since no alternate route existed. There have also been discussions of building a second, alternative bridge for a long time. In May 2018, it was announced by Valeriy Holovko that the national government had signed a deal with China to build the new bridge. However, this never happened, and instead finances came domestically as part of the "Great Construction" project, with a tender being announced by Prozorro for a cable bridge in Kremenchuk in 2020. That same year, it was announced that construction would take three years to complete, and that the new bridge would be 1.7 km in length, use domestic materials, and would be a cable-stayed bridge, although this was later revised to being longer at more than 3 km and costing 11.2 billion hryvnias. Construction finally started on the new bridge in 2021 through a Turkish contractor, with a concrete plant shortly thereafter announced to be installed on the site to help construct the new bridge. The construction continued for some time until the Russian invasion of Ukraine, which led the Turkish contractor to leave Ukraine and Dmytro Lunin to announce the bridge would have to be completed after the war.

==== Water travel ====
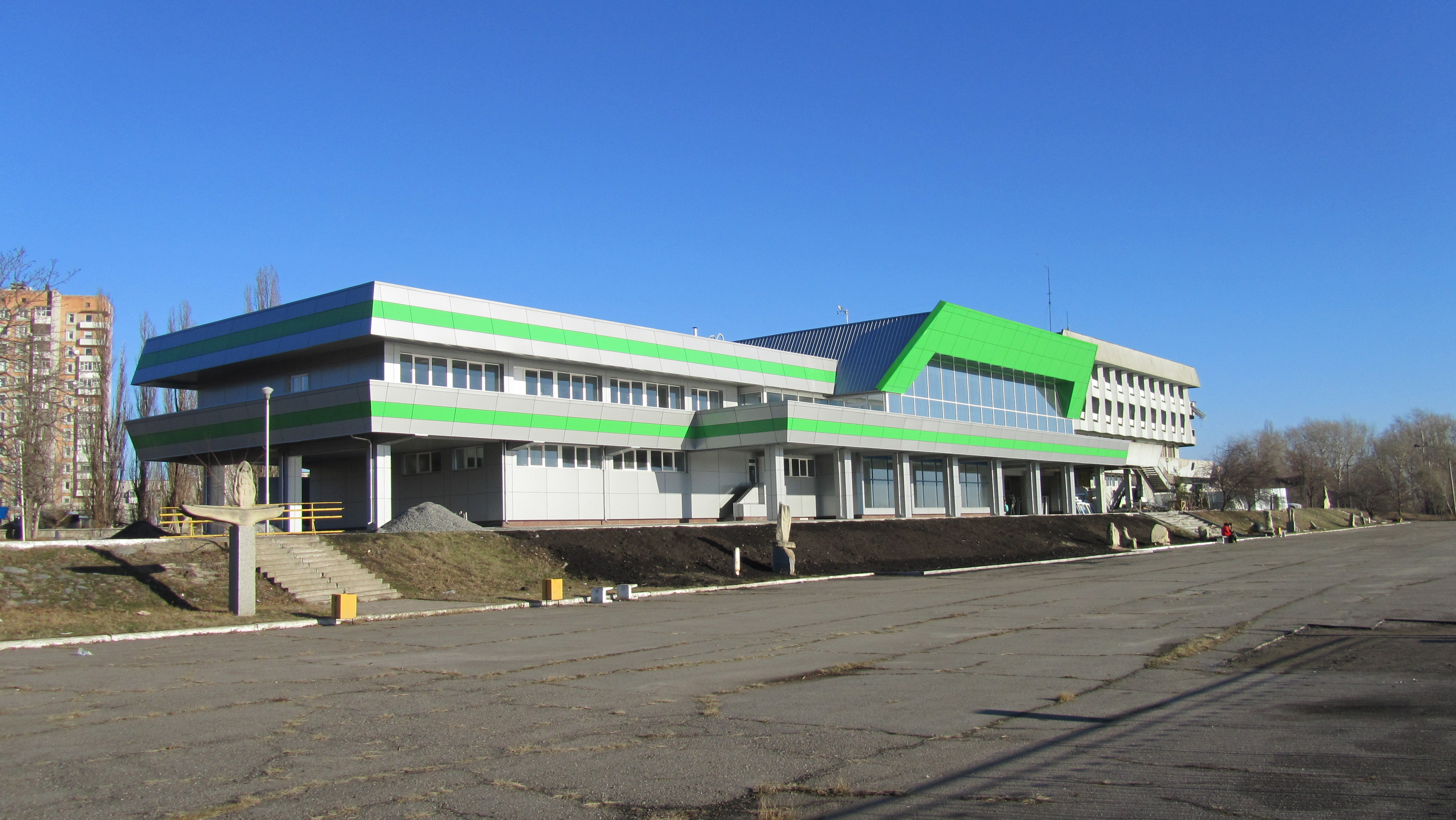
Kremenchuk River Station (since closed).

Kremenchuk had a river station that was used for waterborne travel. The station existed at least into 2003, when Viktor Antypov bought a stake in it, although by 2009 it had ceased to exist. The berthing wall it maintained still continued to operate for vessels that passed through, mainly tourist cruise liners, such as via Viking. There was an attempted revival in 2015 to have waterborne travel, but only as a stop along the Dnipro when it went the Dnipro to Kyiv route from the company Dniprovskyi Ekspres. The river station, though, remained in disuse and was eventually reported to be unsafe by 2019.

=== Energy ===
Kremenchuk CHP in 2008. It was destroyed in 2022 by Russian strikes.

Energy and heat for the city primarily comes from the Kremenchuk CHP, which has operated since 1965, although some areas on the right bank instead use the small CHP of KVBZ. However, the main Kremenchuk CHP was severely damaged by Russian strikes in April 2022, when an Iskander missile hit the plant. Due to this, Dmytro Lunin announced the city would have to divest from the plant towards boiler houses, while efforts would still be underway to restore the CHP, which was transferred to be an oblast-owned property shortly thereafter. In 2024, it was announced that over 200 million hryvnias would be allocated for the CHP's reconstruction, but due to the large amount that this would require, it was decided to transfer the CHP directly to the state.

Heating is primarily organised by the enterprise KP "Teploenerho". Teploenerho, as of 2011, had 30 boilers for natural gas, twelve boiler houses, and maintains a central heating pipeline. In September 2025, the enterprise received humanitarian assistance from the US through Support for Power And Reliability of Connectivity (SPaRC), which provided newer pumps.

=== Water and sanitation ===
Kremenchukvodokanal (Ukrainian: Кременчукводоканал) provides water and sanitation services to the city. The city has had a municipal water system since the days of Mayor Andrii Iziumov, who oversaw the construction of a line from 1911 to 1920.

=== Medicine ===
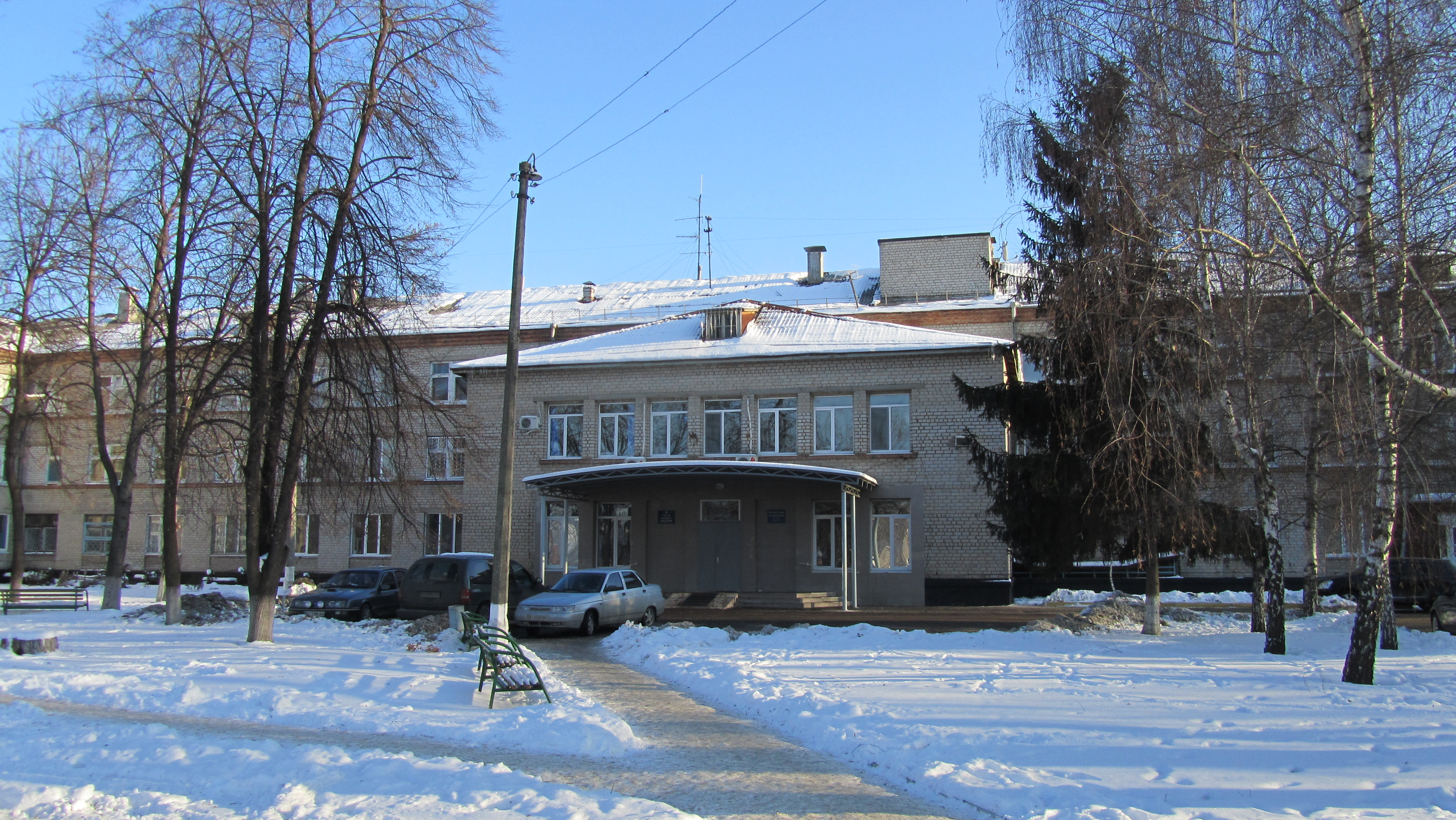
The third city hospital, prior to its merge.

Until 2011, the number of numbered general city hospitals in the city was five, with additional specialty hospitals for children, maternity, and a few polyclinics. There were also a few hospitals meant to serve specific needs, and thus were under oblast control, such as for oncology, dermatology, or venereology. In January 2017, two of the numbered general hospitals, the third and fourth hospitals, were announced by the city council to be prepared to merge together, despite being on opposite sides of the city, which proved controversial. Despite this, they were eventually merged into a larger hospital known as the Intensive Treatment Hospital, which also eventually had the Kremenchuk Perinatal Centre merged into it. The new institution was the first in the city to have a supervisory board due to its size.

== Notable people ==
- Anzor Astemirov, Circassian Islamist insurgent leader
- Aleksandr Avdeyev, politician, former Minister of Culture of Russia
- Boris Chichibabin, poet
- Genrietta Dokhman (1897–1987), geobiologist and phytocenologist
- Yehoshua Hankin, Zionist pioneer
- Alexander Litovchenko, painter
- Emmanuel Mané-Katz, artist
- Anton Makarenko, educator, social worker and writer
- Kostiantyn Milonadis, sculptor
- Leo Ornstein, composer and pianist
- Alexander Pechersky, one of the leaders of Sobibor uprising
- Vyacheslav Senchenko, World welterweight boxing champion
- Avraham Shlonsky, Israeli poet and editor
- Charles David Spivak, founder of the Jewish Consumptives' Relief Society
- Dimitri Tiomkin, film composer
- Yehiel Tschlenow, Zionist activist

== Twin towns – sister cities ==
Kremenchuk is twinned with:

- Svishtov, Bulgaria
- Wenzhou, China
- Bydgoszcz, Poland
- Berdiansk, Ukraine
- Bila Tserkva, Ukraine
- Kolomyia, Ukraine
- Jiayuguan, China
- Alytus, Lithuania
- Sidoarjo, Indonesia
- Michalovce, Slovakia
- Snina, Slovakia
- Providence, Rhode Island, United States
- Bitola, North Macedonia
- Rishon LeZion, Israel

== Gallery ==
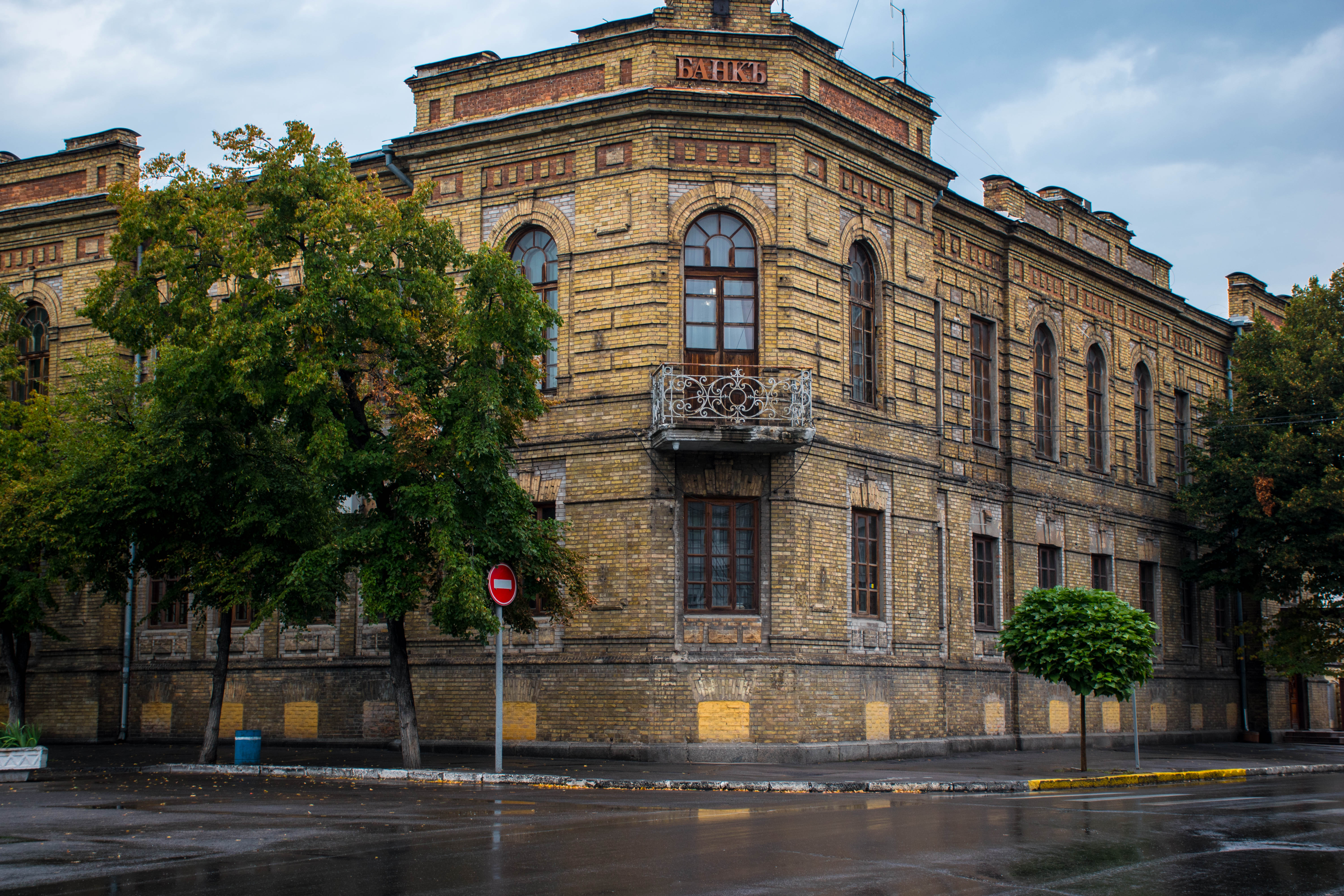
Former State Bank building

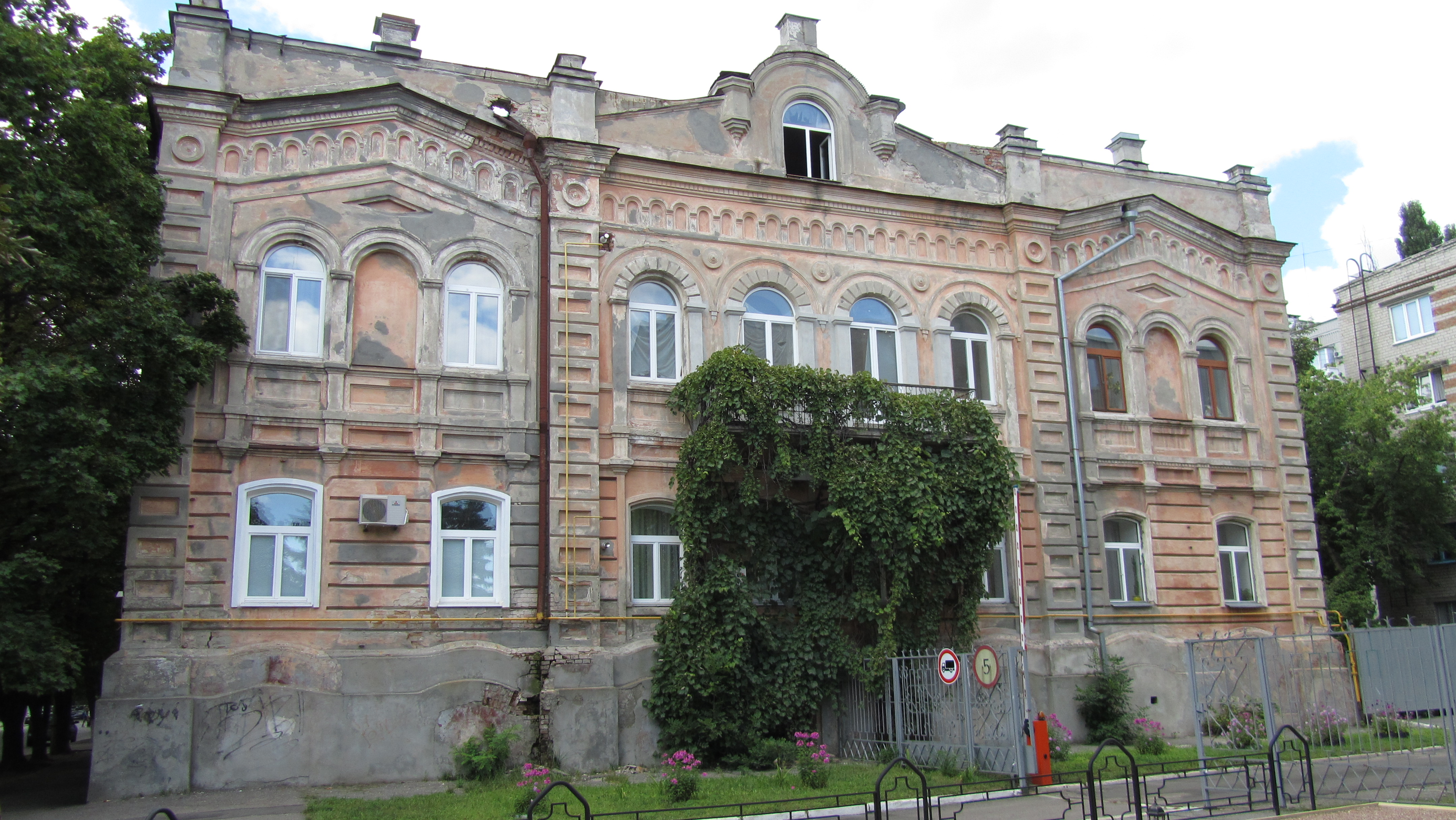
Former zemstvo residence

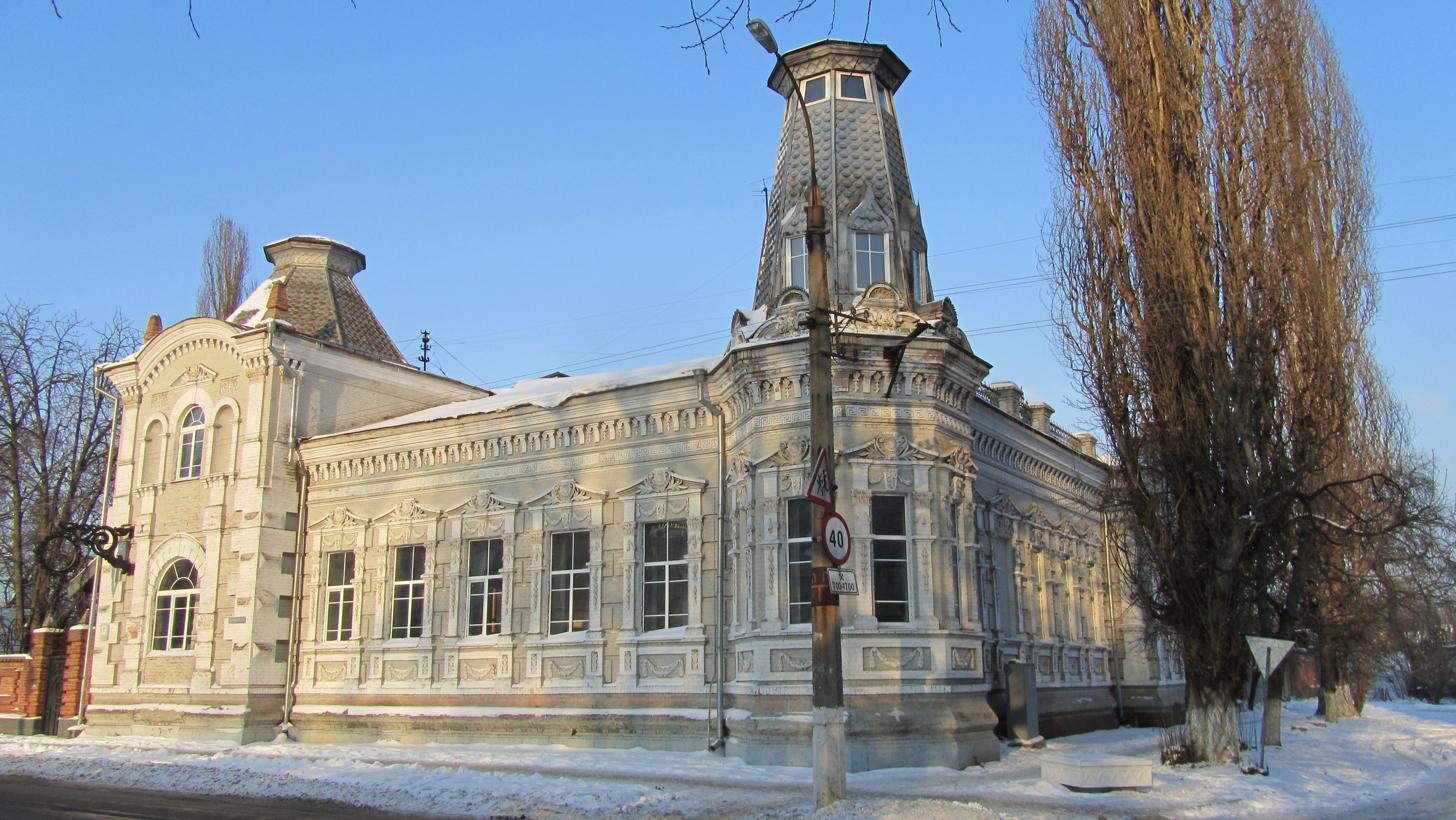
Churkin house

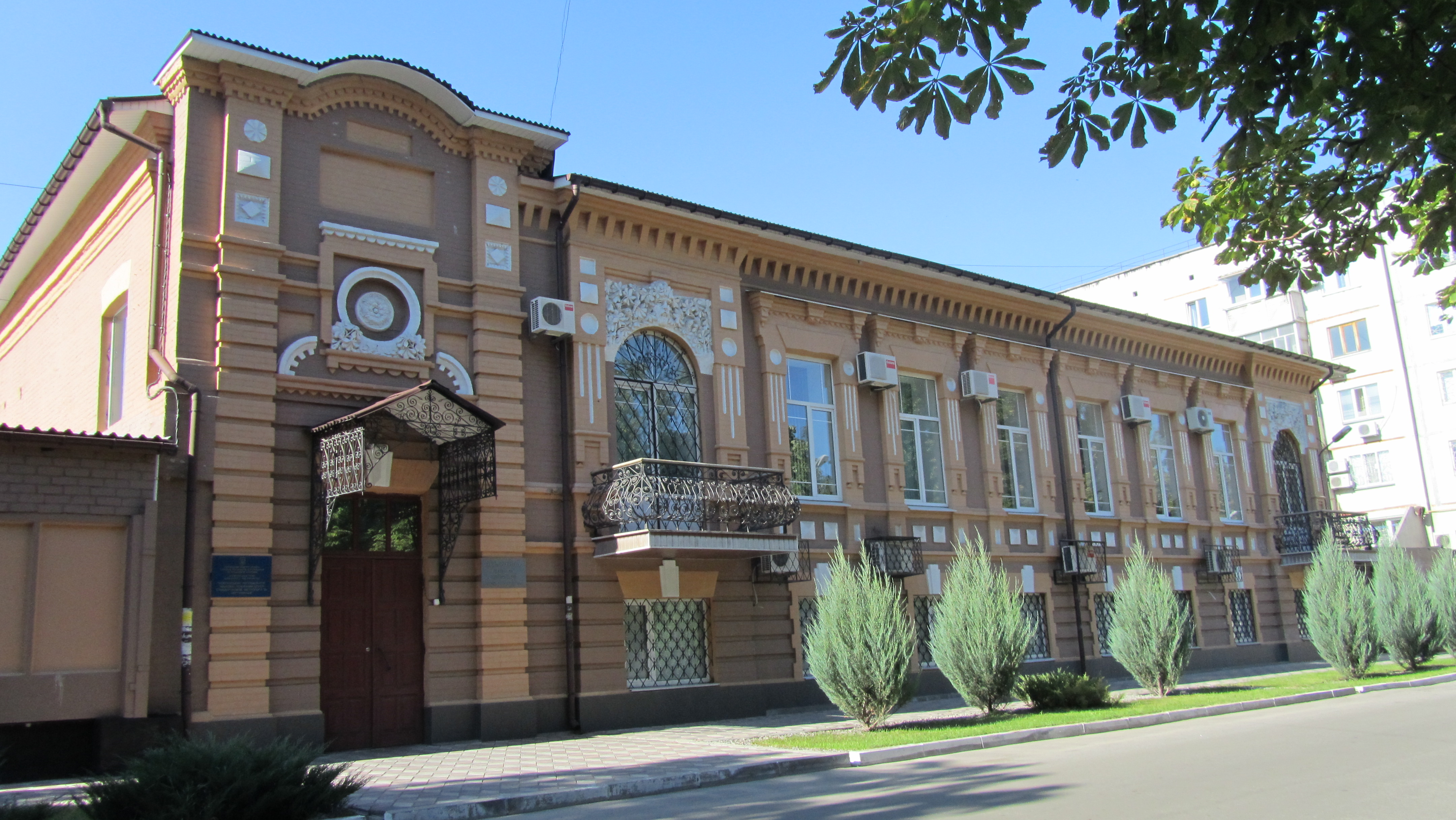
Rabinovich house

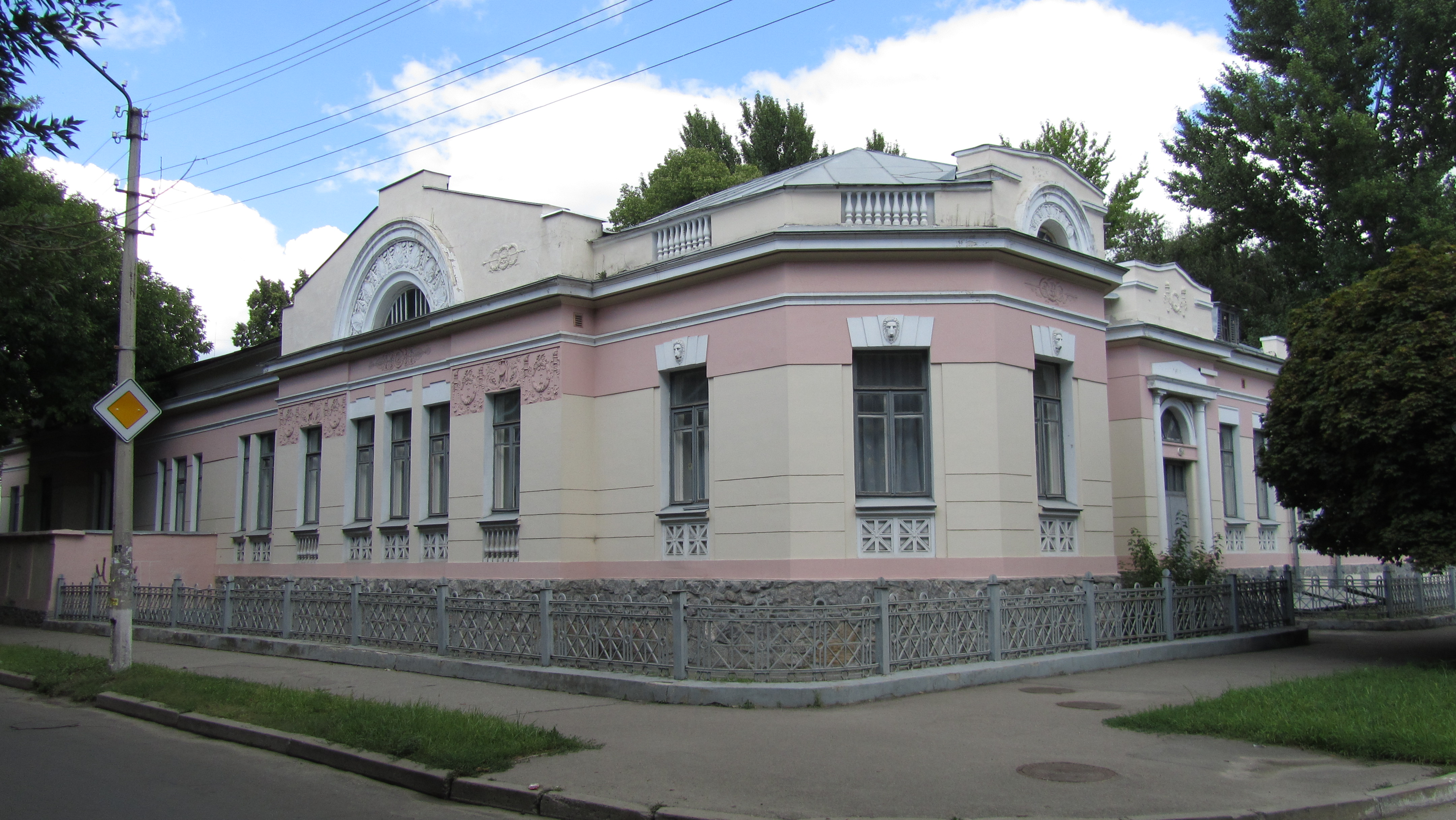
Historical building

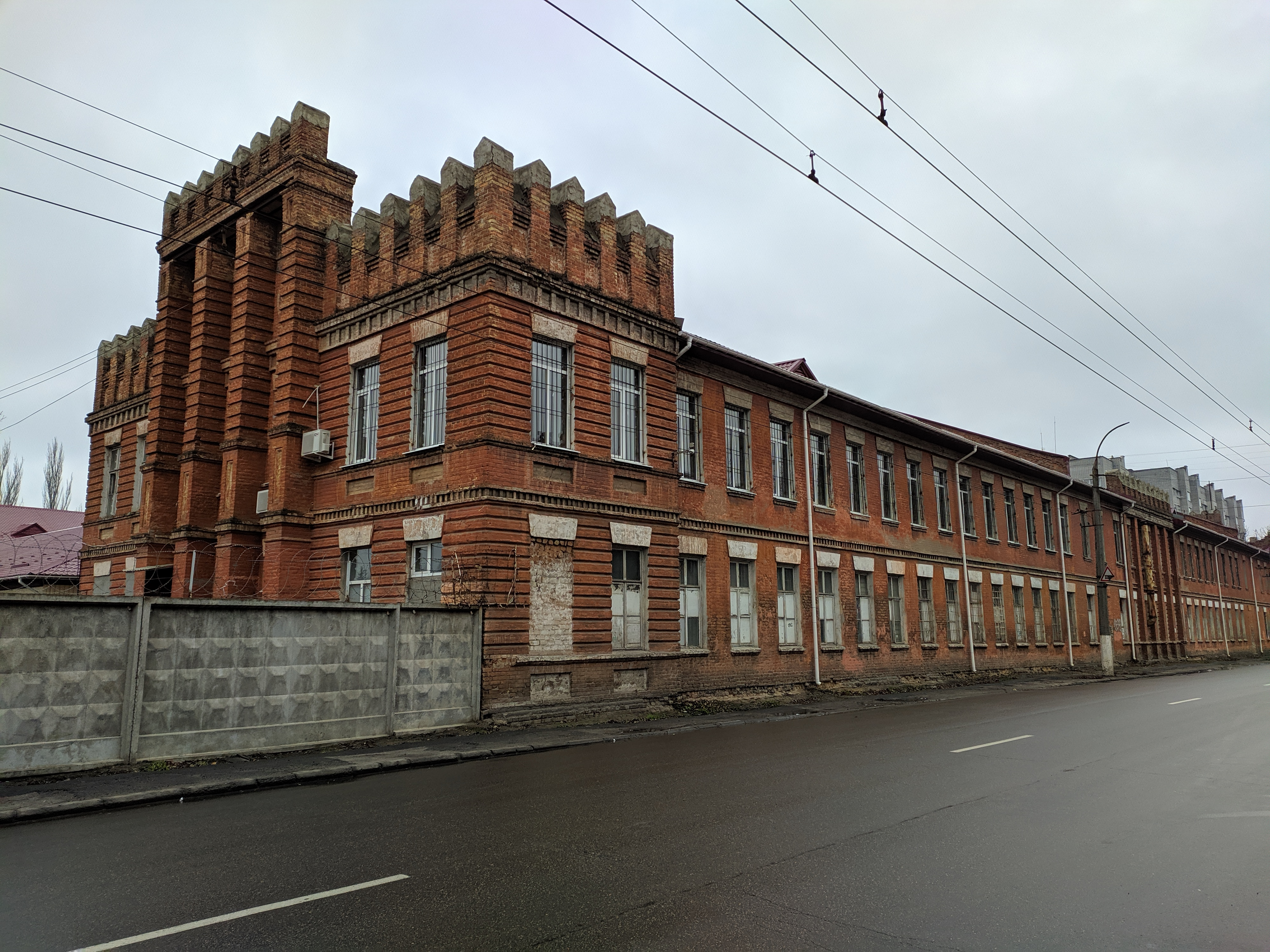
Former Bryansk regiment barracks

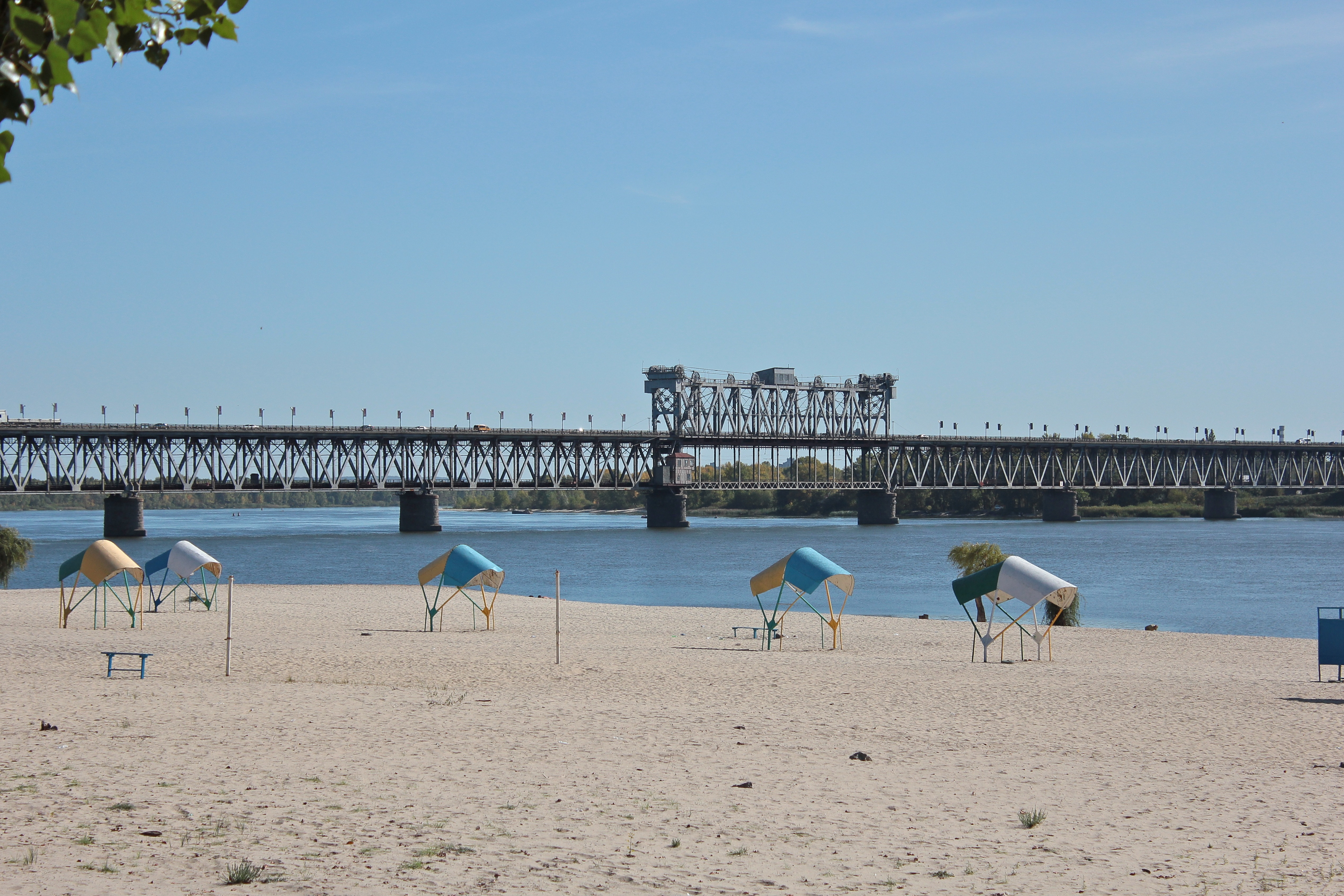
Kryukiv Bridge and beach

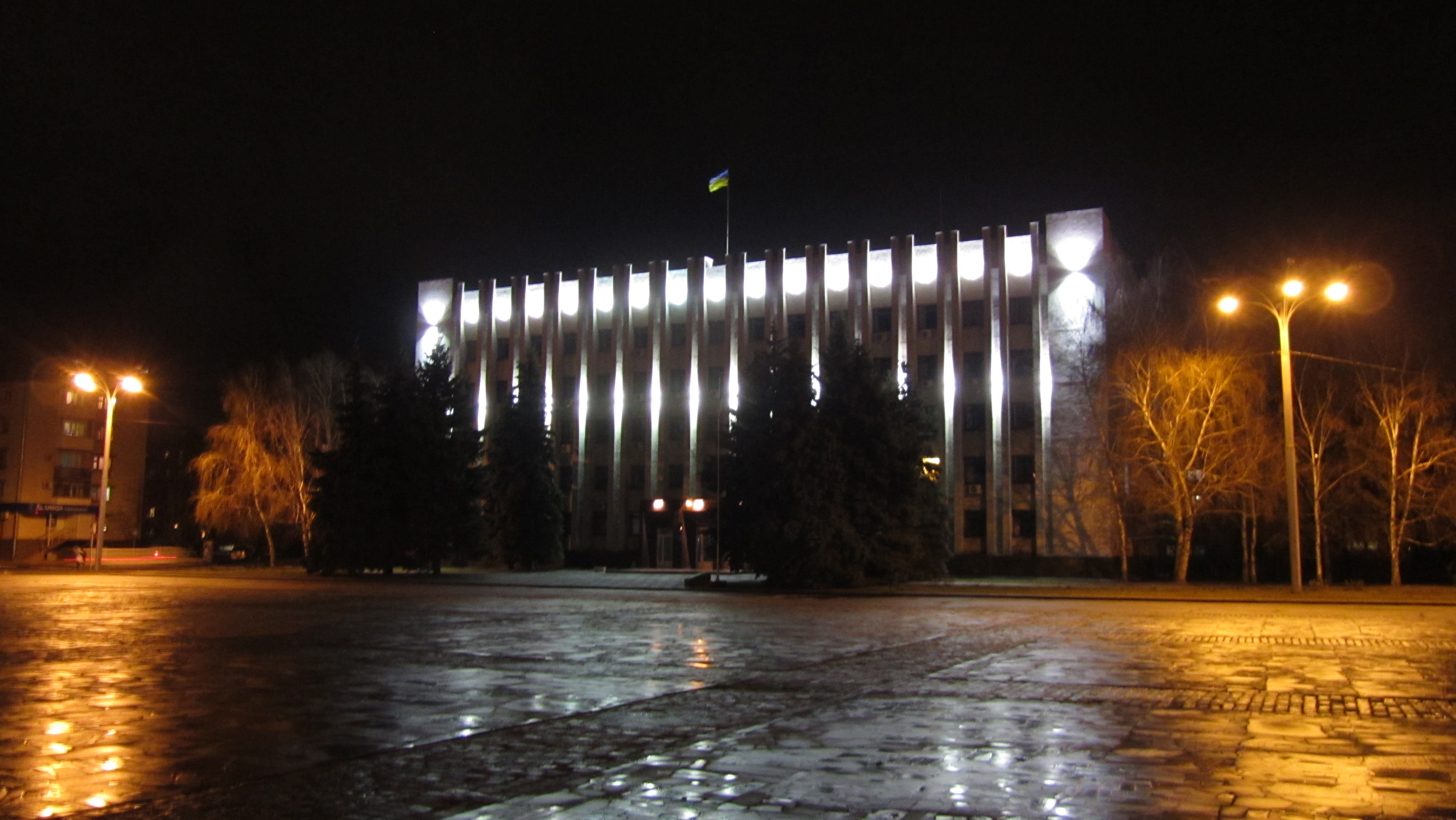
City Hall

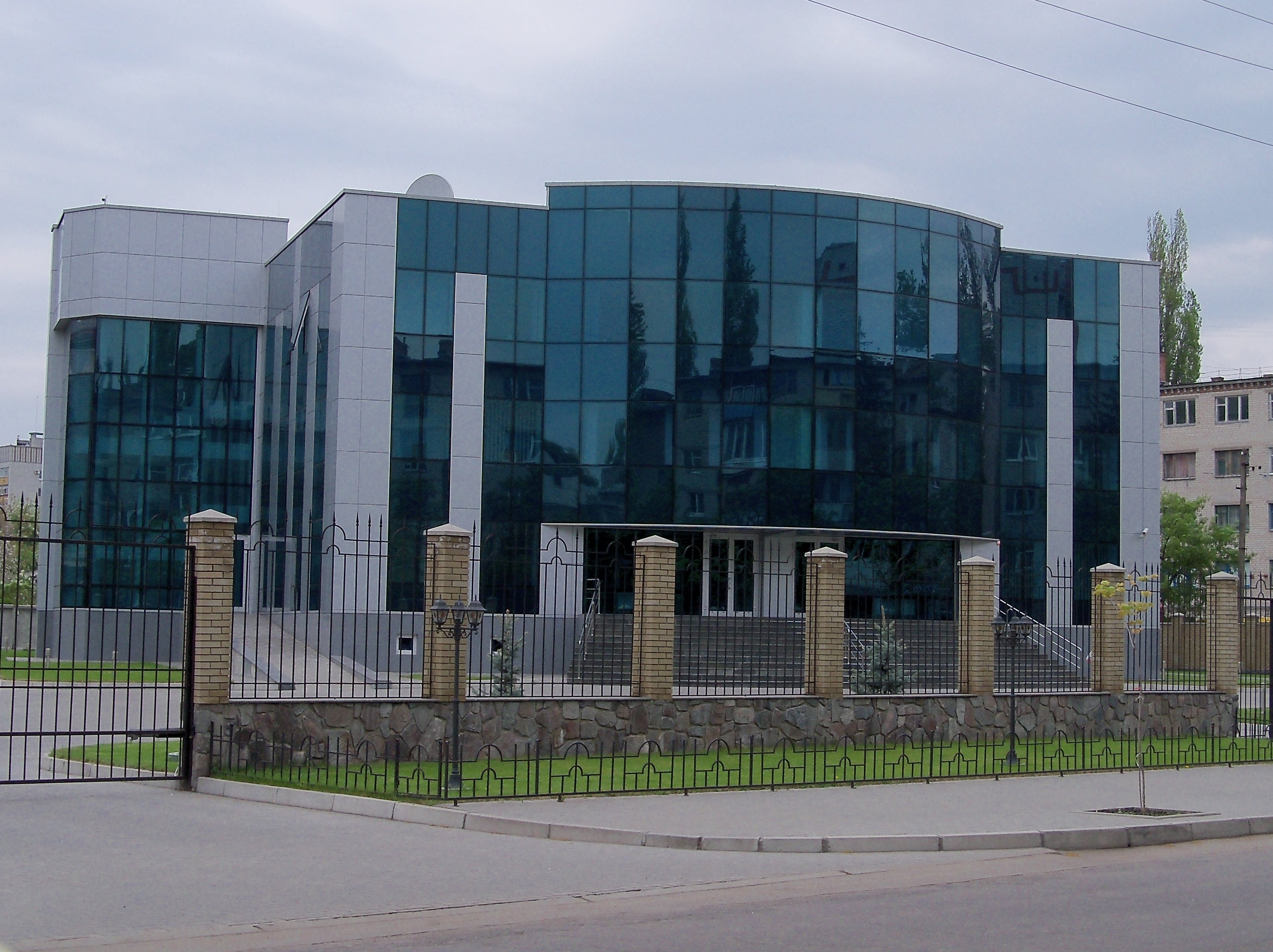
TV company office building

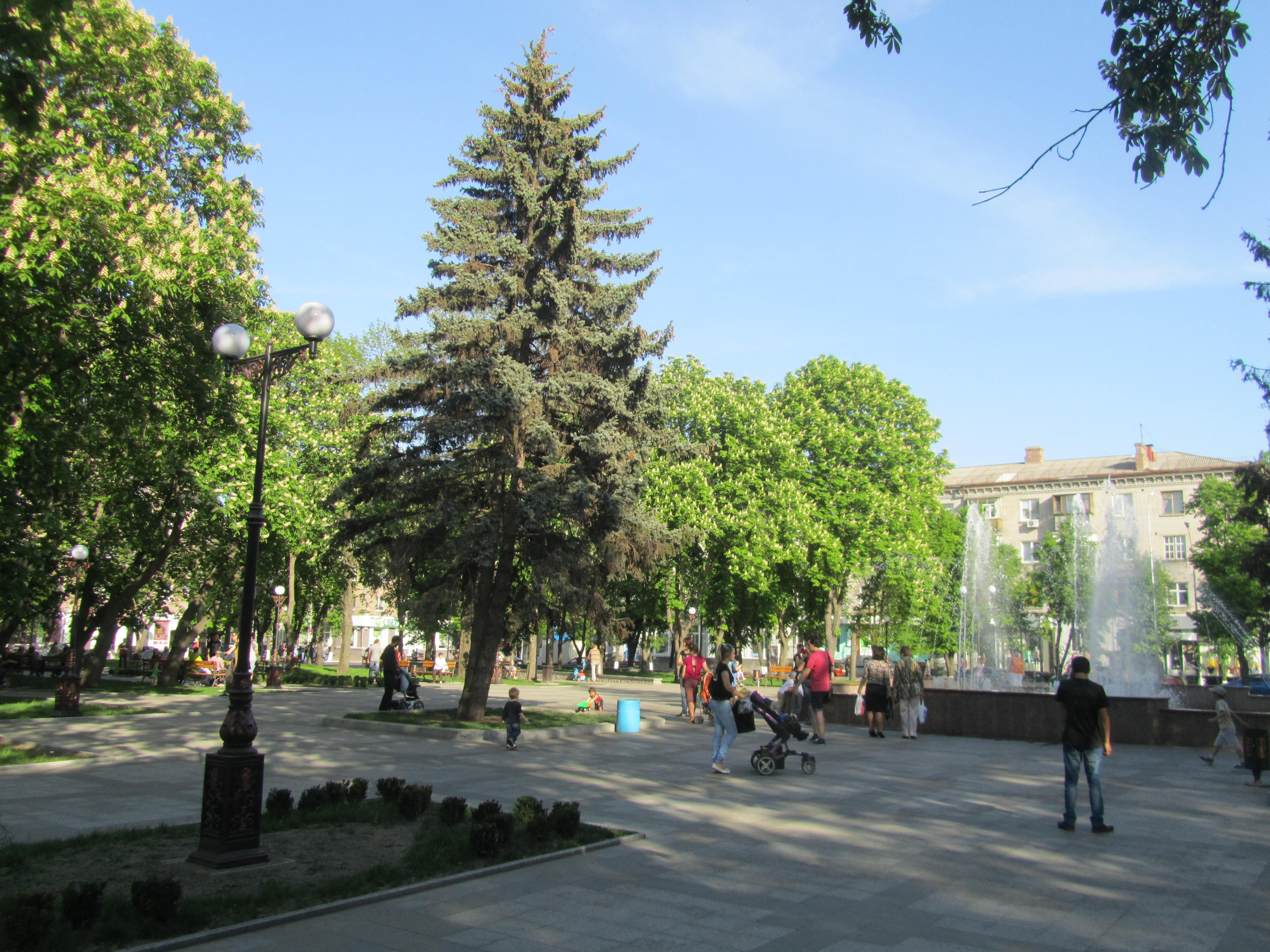
A park

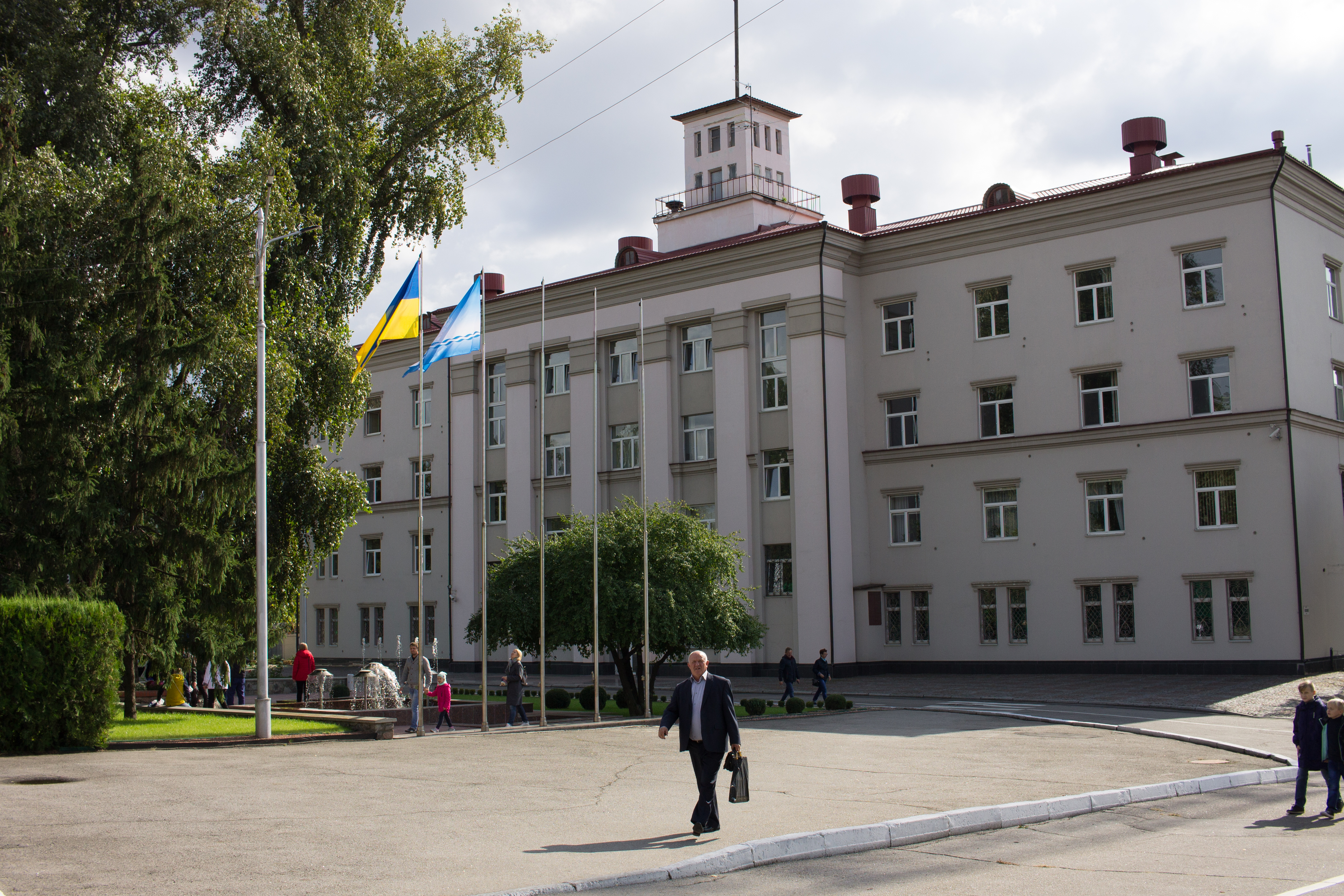
Poltava railway department

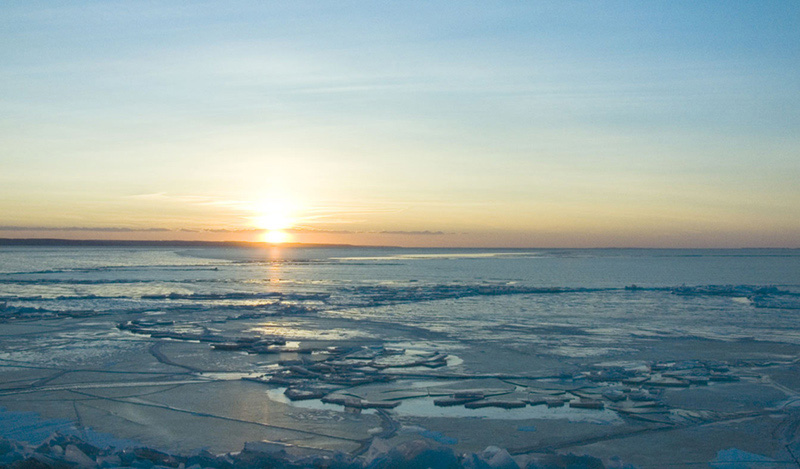
Sunset at Kremenchuk Reservoir

== See also ==
- Kremenchuk University
- Kremenchuk River Port
- Kremenchuk Steel Works

== Sources ==
- Suprunenko, O. B. (2004). Старожитності Кременчука: Археологічні пам'ятки території та округи міста (in Ukrainian). Kremenchuk: Археологія.
- Вирський, Дмитро (2019). Новоросія Incognita: Кременчук 1764–1796 рр. (матеріали з історії регіональної столиці) (in Ukrainian). Kyiv: Поліграфічна дільниця Інституту історії України НАН України.
- Вирський, Дмитро (2003). КРЕМЕНЧУК 1917-1920 рр.: ПРОВІНЦІЙНІ ОБРАЗИ РЕВОЛЮЦІЇ (in Ukrainian). Kyiv: НАЦІОНАЛЬНА АКАДЕМІЯ НАУК УКРАЇНИ ІНСТИТУТ ІСТОРІЇ УКРАЇНИ.
- Ревегук, Віктор (2016). Полтавщина в перший рік Української революції. Доба Центральної Ради (березень 1917 – квітень 1918 рр.). Полтавський літератор.
