= History of Kremenchuk =

Timeline of Kremenchuk

- Polish–Lithuanian Commonwealth 1571-1648
- Cossack Hetmanate 1648-1667
- Tsardom of Russia/Russian Empire 1667-1917
- Ukrainian War of Independence
  - Russian Provisional Government Mar-Nov 1917
  - Ukrainian People's Republic Nov 1917-Jan 1918
  - UPRS Jan-Mar 1918
  - Imperial Germany (under occupation, de jure part of the UPR and Ukrainian State) Mar-Nov 1918
  - UPR Nov 1918-Feb 1919
  - UPRS Feb-May 1919
  - Hryhoriv Uprising May 1919
  - UPRS May-Aug 1919
  - AFSR Aug-Dec 1919
  - UPRS/UkrSSR Dec 1919-Aug 1920
- Ukrainian SSR Aug 1920-Dec 1922
- Soviet Union Dec 1922-1941
- Nazi Germany Nazi Germany 1941–1943 (as part of Reichskommissariat Ukraine, under occupation)
- Soviet Union 1943–1991
- Ukraine 1991–present

The history of Kremenchuk starts with the human settlement in the area of the city, which is believed to have begun around the Mesolithic era as part of the Kukrets culture. The city was then inhabited by various cultures until the Mongol invasion of Kievan Rus', when the area was temporarily occupied by the Golden Horde before being depopulated due to raids by Meñli I Giray. After gradually recovering, a fortified point known under various names for Kremenchuk was mentioned by the Grand Duchy of Lithuania and by Muscovy, although the modern city's founding date is considered by most scholars to be 1571. This date traces back to the aftermath of the Union of Lublin, when quartermaster-general of the army, Hryhoriy Svyrhovsky, founded the city as a fortress for the Crown of the Kingdom of Poland. However, for the next few decades, the place would have no population, and no work would be done on actually making the fortress until 1633, when Stefan Rduzki was given the estate as the "tract called Krzemienczuk". In 1635, the French engineer Guillaume Le Vasseur de Beauplan then finally built the Kremenchuk Fortress, although contrary to plans, it was small and old, while the city of Krzemienczuk would receive Magdeburg law rights that year. After the Khmelnytsky Uprising, the city of Kremenchuk then became a sotnia of the Chyhyryn regiment within the Cossack Hetmanate, briefly even having its own regiment from 1661 to 1663 known as the Kremenchuk Regiment. During this time, the city remained contested, constantly changing hands between pro-Polish and pro-Muscovite forces, before finally being burned down in 1663 during a siege by Muscovite forces. After the Treaty of Andrusovo, the ruined city was transferred to the Tsardom of Russia, which later became the Russian Empire.

The city of Kremenchuk was revived over the course of the 1700s under the Russians, becoming known as the city of Kremenchug, especially after 1765 when it briefly became the capital of the Novorossiya Governorate until the title was transferred to Yekaterinoslav. However, this was derailed when both a plague and flood hit the city in the 1780s, which caused the city to be demoted back down and incorporated into the Poltava Governorate. Over time, the city then gradually shifted from being of military importance for its fortress to becoming a major regional trade centre on the Dnipro, which was also the time that the city started to see a rapid rise in its Jewish population. During the brief 1905 Russian Revolution, the city saw massive strikes that were brutally suppressed. However, during the subsequent Ukrainian War of Independence, which was part of the Russian Civil War, the city constantly saw action, changing hands between the Ukrainian People's Republic, Bolsheviks, Imperial Germans, White movement, and members of the Hryhoriv Uprising. The latter two movements saw pogroms on the Jewish population, before Bolshevik control was consolidated by 1920 and the city was annexed into the Soviet Union in 1922. During the subsequent interwar period, due to the region's instability, Kremenchug was elevated to be the capital of the Kremenchuk Governorate, before being demoted back down again in favour of Poltava, which was then followed by another devastating flood in 1931 and the Holodomor. After the start of Operation Barbarossa during World War II, the city was captured by German forces in September 1941. During the city's occupation, the large Jewish population of the city, which had prior to the war made up 22% of the entire population, was massacred as part of the Holocaust. In addition, the city was the site of three prisoner of war camps, with 50,000 additional prisoners dying under German control. The city was eventually liberated in September 1943 during the early stages of the Battle of the Dnieper. Despite the mass destruction caused by the war, which left only 10-15% of the original buildings in the city standing, Kremenchug rapidly developed afterwards as an industrial centre because of the opening of KrAZ and the Kremenchuk Oil Refinery.

After the collapse of the Soviet Union, the city then became a part of an independent Ukraine in 1991, and the Ukrainian name of Kremenchuk shifted into wider usage. The enterprises in the city were then privatised, with the oil refinery becoming more important post-2012 following the closure of the Lysychansk Oil Refinery, making it the only surviving oil refinery in Ukraine. During Euromaidan, the city saw protests, which culminated with the destruction of Vladimir Lenin monuments in the city and the assassination of mayor Oleh Babaiev. After this, the city was then decommunised, and many of its streets were renamed. During the 2022 Russian invasion of Ukraine, Kremenchuk took in thousands of internally displaced people from the front, with the number 31,000 as of 2026. The city has also repeatedly been hit by Russian strikes since the start of the war, which destroyed the oil refinery and led to multiple energy and power outages. In June 2022, the city saw its deadliest strike when Russian missiles hit the Amstor shopping mall, which killed 22 people and was widely condemned.

== Antiquity ==
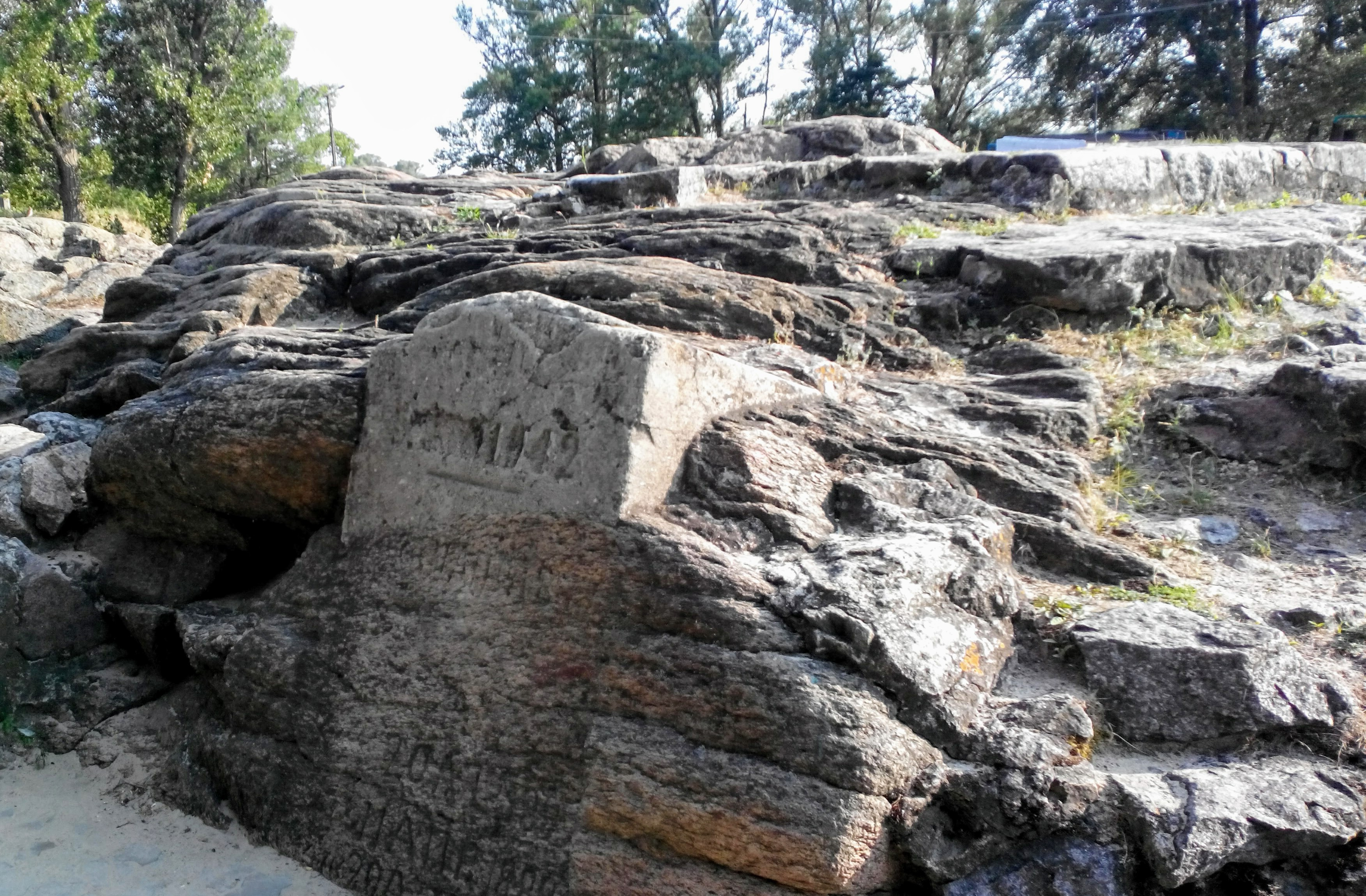
A granite outcrop in Kremenchuk from the Precambrian era, which is used as a flood-level marking.

Settlement in the areas around Kremenchuk first began during the Pleistocene, as evidenced by remains such as mammoth and woolly rhinoceros bones recovered during excavations done in 1951-54. The excavations done during the 1950s were at the Malkokhnivka granite quarry, with a notable find being a mammoth tusk that was likely split by a human hand. However, it isn't until the Mesolithic era that there is proof of humans being in Kremenchuk as part of the Kukrets culture. Some of the more notable items traced to this period include a carved bone spear from deposits near the modern-day Silicate Brick Factory, which had notch marks and engravings on the point tip that might have been used in rituals during hunting. The closest analogue to it is the Ihren 8 site near Dnipro. Settlements from this era include "Komsomolska", which is near the village of Pidluzhne. During the subsequent Neolithic era, the settlement of Rakivka was founded within what is now Kriukivskyi District. Rakivka was found in 1930 with items such as flint scrapers and pottery, although the site would take on more importance once later surveys confirmed that Rakivka was used as a settlement during multiple eras from the Dnieper–Donets culture to the Chalcolithic to the Bronze Age. Surveys have also found many antler tools and a celt from the Cucuteni–Trypillia culture.

During the Bronze Age, modern-day Kremenchuk would still be populated at Rakivske, although other settlements would pop up, such as at Velyka Kokhnivka and Oleksandrivsky. In 2003, excavations done at Prydniprovsky City Park also found a settlement of the Sabatynivka culture that was a semi-subterranean dwelling from around the 2nd millennium. Into the early Iron Age, the area was populated by the Cimmerians, which is evidenced by bronze cheek-pieces whhich was probably associated with an elite warrier was found in Molodizhnyi alongside later swords and picks. The area was then populated by the Zarubintsy culture, who made a settlement on the outskirts of the modern-day city and left behind fragments of materials there and at Rakivske. This culture was replaced by the Chernyakhov culture, who left behind child burials and denarii from the Romans of Marcus Aurelius and Commodus. In the nearby villages around the reservoir, other hoards of solidi were found of Honorius and Valentinian III and bracelets, which date to at least before 455 AD. Numerous artifacts from a burial of the Saltovo-Mayaki culture were later found.

=== Middle Ages ===
Some chronicles claim in what is now known to be a legend that a fortress in Kremenchuk existed as early as the era of Kubrat, or during Vytautas the Great. However, Kievan Rus' era items have been founded such as a rare jug and pottery that might have been at a fortified settlement. The Mongol invasion of Kievan Rus' led to people of the Golden Horde then settling in the area, who probably intermingled as reconstruction of burials have found mixed Mongoloid features. The areas around Kremenchuk would then be slowly depopulated, especially during the era of Meñli I Giray due to raids. A document from this era of the Grand Duchy of Lithuania lists a "Kermenchuk" in 1490, although this is believed to be just an unpopulated landmark and not a settlement, with a further note saying "there used to be a little town here; now it lies as empty field".

== Nominal founding of Kremenchuk ==
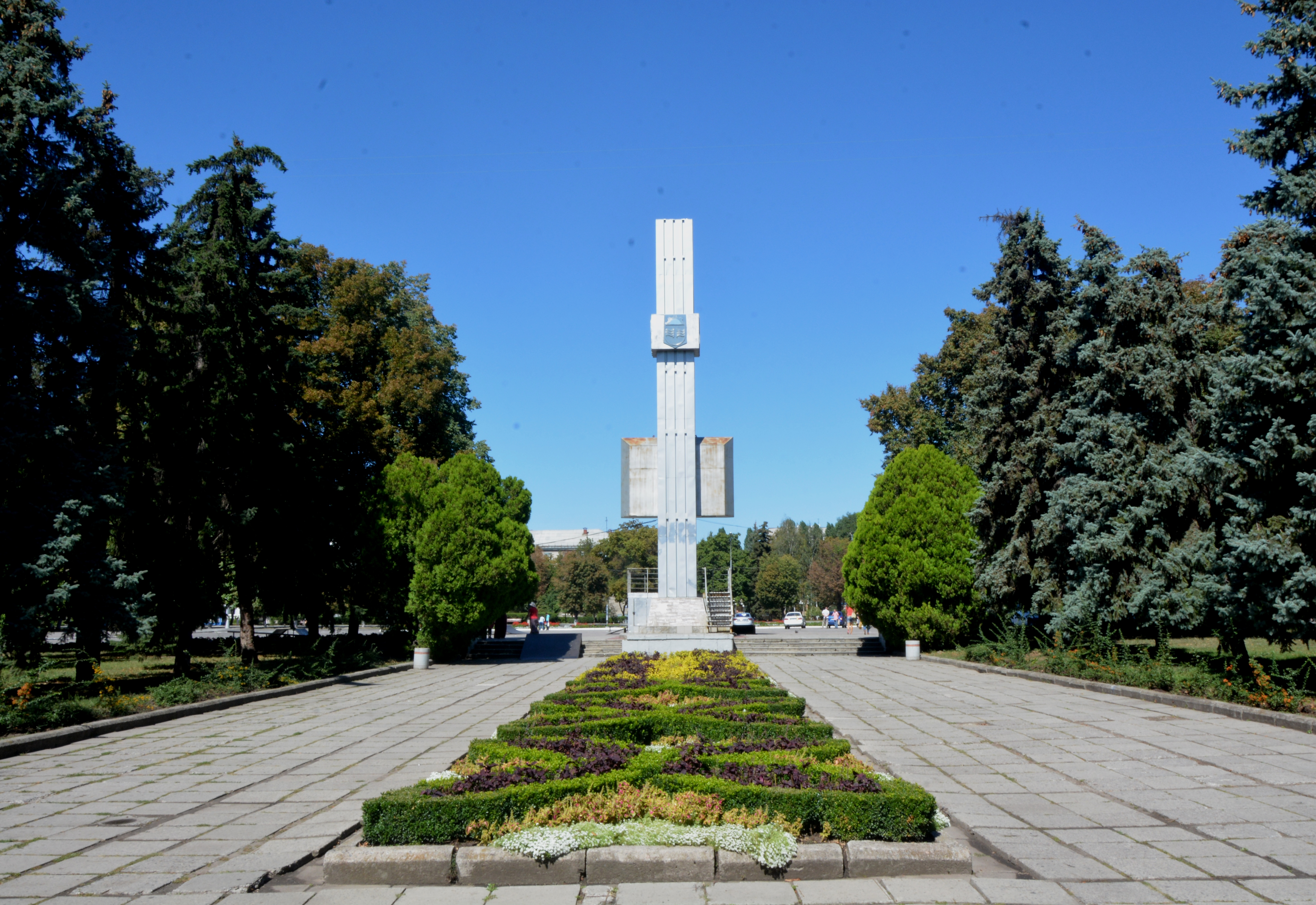
Stele in honour of the 400th anniversary of Kremenchuk. The monument was built in 1971, commemorating the 1571 date.

Prior to the traditional founding date of 1571, Kremenchuk was already a site as a crossing point by the Tatars across the Dnipro. The site was mentioned in 1550 by a writer, Mykhalon Lytvyn, in his petition to the Grand Duchy of Lithuania under the name "Kermêczik" for a place that needed to be fortified. It was also mentioned in other records, such as one in 1552 of a survey of the Cherkasy Castle as a seasonal fishing/hunting spot, mentioned as an ukhid "Керменъчуцкий". There are also two military instances dated to this period: in 1556, the Muscovite detachment of Matvii Ivanovych Rzhevsky built boats in Kremenchuk to cross the Psel when chasing the Tatars, and in 1559 with the campaign of Danylo Adashev (working on behalf of Dmytro Vyshnevetsky) mentions a "little town on the Psel" with a fortification. (Note: The 1556 mention has been debated, as others believe that the site was not Kremenchuk but an area closer to Putyvl.) However, this little town was not permanent and was already abandoned by 1561-62.

Most scholars agree that modern-day Kremencuk was founded in the aftermath of the Union of Lublin, which transferred most of the area to the Crown of the Kingdom of Poland, which itself was part of the Polish–Lithuanian Commonwealth. After the union was signed, it was decided in 1570 to do a census of the estates to strengthen the new borders under Jerzy Jazłowiecki. In 1571, it is then said that the city of Kremenchuk was founded by the quartermaster-general of the army, Hryhoriy Svyrhovsky, as a fortress. (Note: Vyrsky in his work disputes both these points. He says 1571 is a conventional date as the government did not have the funds to actually fully establish Kremenchuk, and that in reality the establishment took place over subsequent decades. He also disputes Svyrhovsky being the founder, instead identifying a Cossack known as Ivan (Jan) Svirhovsky (Svirchevsky) as the founder. He says that the misunderstanding about the figure comes from Svirhovsky being renamed to Hryhoriy, which was repeated in History of Little Russia by Mykola Markevych, which was then spread by Polish historian Marian Dubiecki.) A separate, distinct founding legend from the Poles also sometimes says that instead the city was founded by a nobleman from Lublin known as "Świerszczowski". Still, some researchers also identify the founding to the princes of Vyshnevetsky, who were starostas of Cherkasy and Kaniv, who were said to have built fortifications in the abandoned town of 1561-62 or the areas of Vytautas.

The fortress described in the founding of 1571, however, would never actually be built despite the decision. The area instead, as a ukhid, would slowly become privatised and by 1589 was nominally under the ownership of a nobleman from Kyiv, Jan (Ivan) Bliżyński of the Korczak coat of arms until 1595, when he ceded the life tenure rights. It was noted at the time as a place that did not have a human settlement. In 1590, Mikołaj Yazłowieck, the then starosta of Sniatyn, proposed that Zaporozhian Cossacks headed by Jan Oryshovsky from Chełm could populate the area and that Kremenchuk could be granted the status of a state fortress. This project never happened because the Cossacks were not paid and felt oppressed, so they led an uprising under Krzysztof Kosiński. Kremenchuk being barren and not having any population is further attested in 1594 during the journey of Erich Lassota von Steblau, who described Kremenchuk as only having an old earthen castle, although maps under Mikołaj Krzysztof Radziwiłł still recorded a place called "Kremenchuk-Kremenchyk" as being inhabited despite it most likely being not.

== Polish rule and founding of Kremenchuk Fortress ==
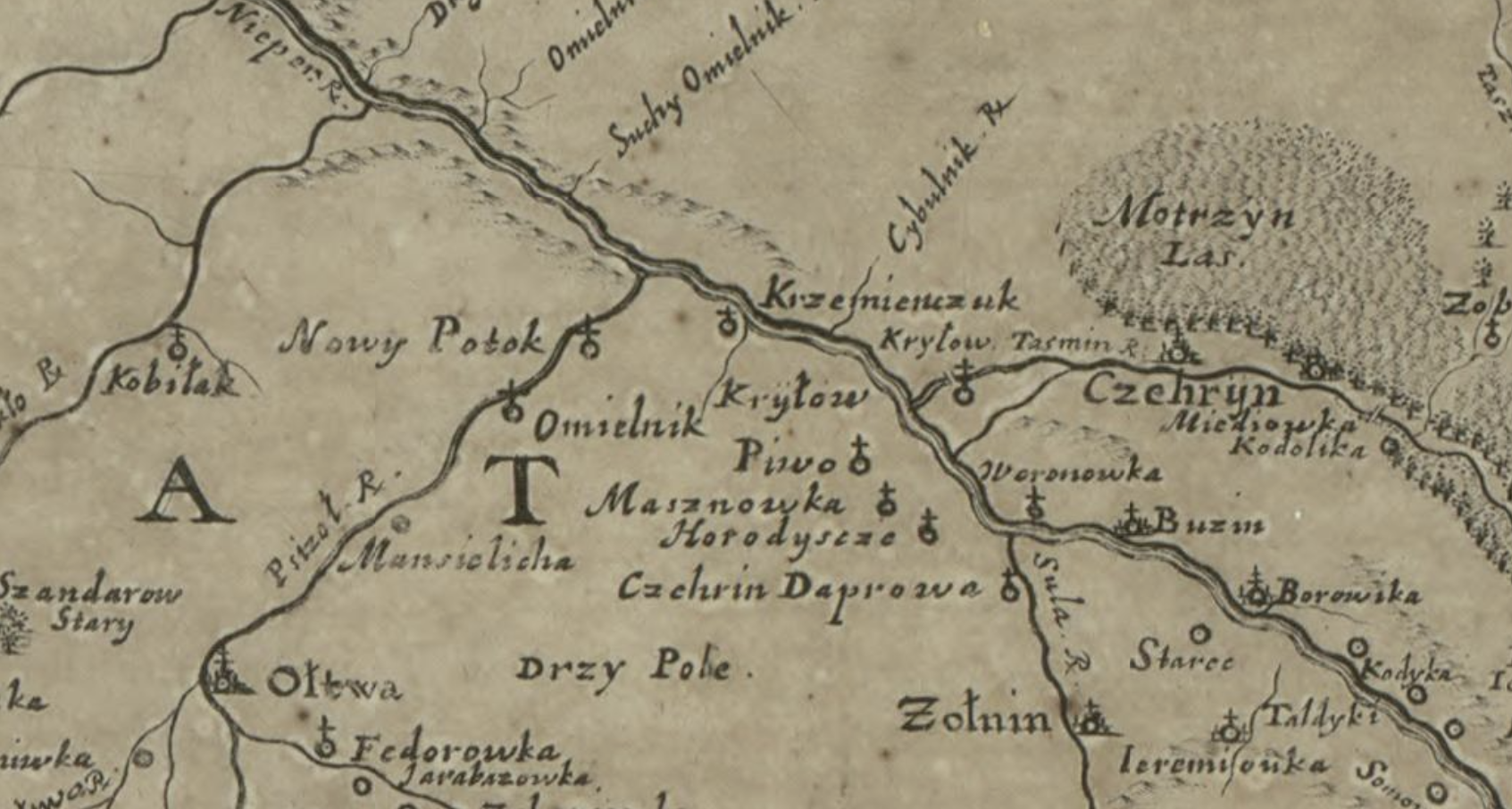
Map from 1648 depicting what is now Kremenchuk as the city of Krzemienczuk.

The actual inhabitation of Kremenchuk would only begin around 1633, when Stefan Rudzki, alongside a co-grantee, Zygmunt Lesiecki, was given the estate by Władysław IV as the "tract called Krzemienczuk". In 1635, the French engineer Guillaume Le Vasseur de Beauplan, who was in the service of Stanisław Koniecpolski, began finally building a fortress in the ruins of Kremenchuk, envisioning a four-sided fort on a hill surrounded by the Dnipro, although this only remained in drawings, and instead a smaller, older fortification was built. That year, on 8 January, the town of Kremenchuk was officially granted Magdeburg law rights, erecting a "new town called Krzemienczuk, situated in the land of Kyiv". However, this new inhabitation proved controversial, and so in August 1637 the Podstarosta of Cherkasy, Yuri Rusynovych, arrived in Kremenchuk and expelled Rudzki while plundering it. Rudzki, in his part, issued a complaint about how Kremenchuk was his holding, although other magnates said it was their holding in claims, leading to the holding of Kremenchuk constantly changing hands during its founding. (Note: The reason it was disputed is that Rudzki's original grant in 1633 was not approved by any starosta administration, just the king. In February 1637, Władysław IV then formally granted Kremenchuk to Stanisław Koniecpolski, who had also recently inherited Pereyaslav, even though de jure Kremenchuk was considered the territory of Cherkasy. Despite this, in March 1637, Rudzki transferred his rights to Kremenchuk to Tomasz Zamoyski even though Zamoyski also never had a prior connection to the area. The Vyshnevetsky family, the starostas of Cherkasy, considered this an infringement on their territory, as they claimed the area as theirs, which led to the plundering of Kremenchuk in August 1637. In 1638, Prince Oleksandr Vyshnevetsky, who had become starosta of Cherkasy, went against the royal grant and ceded the territory of Kremenchuk to a client, Olbracht Krosnowski. Kremenchuk was again fought over from 1645 to 1647 by the magnates Jerzy Niemirycz (backed by Koniecpolski) and Stanisław Potocki (brother of the starosta of Cherkasy, M. Potocki).) By 1638 it had become a garrison, and by the 1640s it was already a functioning town with a customs post in 1643.

== Cossack Hetmanate and burning ==
During the Khmelnytsky Uprising in 1648, the Polish nobility were expelled from Kremenchuk, and the city became a sotnia of the Chyhyryn regiment within the Cossack Hetmanate. After the death of Khmelnytsky and the fracturing of the Hetmanate, the officers of Kremenchuk favoured the Poles, while the townspeople were local to Muscovy. Evliya Çelebi, during his travels through Kremenchuk in 1657, confirmed this by saying the city was "on the land of the Polish king", and he also noted there was a small fortress in Kremenchuk with a garrison and monastery. After the uprising led by Martyn Pushkar, Kyrylo Andriyovych, the colonel of the Chyhyryn regiment, became ruler of Kremenchuk. Notably, he was also a supporter of Ivan Vyhovsky, the pro-Polish Hetman of the Zaporizhzhian Host. At the Treaty of Hadiach, Vyhovsky led the delegation of the city of Kremenchuk to the Sejm, in which he petitioned and was granted a confirmation of Kremenchuk's rights under the Magdeburg Law from 1635. Additionally, on 4 June 1659, the city, which was then part of the Commonwealth, was granted by Jan Kazimierz with royal privileges, which exempted the city from certain taxes and tolls. However, the treaty quickly fell apart after pro-Russian Cossacks under Yakym Somko rebelled against the pro-Polish policies of Yurii Khmelnytsky, with Somko taking Kremenchuk. In 1661, hetman Yakym Somko elevated Kremenchuk with its own regiment known as the Kremenchuk Regiment, carving out pieces of the Chyhyryn regiment, which was initially ruled by Kyrylo Andriyovych.

The city then came under fierce tensions between the Poles and Muscovites, coming first under siege in 1662 by the Poles until Grigory Romodanovsky's troops arrived to stop the siege. In June 1663, the "Black Council" saw Somko executed, and control of the left bank came under Ivan Briukhovetsky, who liquidated the Kremenchuk Regiment shortly thereafter, although attempts to revive it would continue up until 1666. Kremenchuk then came under Polish control, at least by 26 June 1663 when Pavlo Teteria reported that the Muscovites were attempting to capture the city. Briukhovetsky had wanted Kremenchuk as a bridgehead to reach Chyhyryn and Kyiv. The Muscovites and Left-Bank Cossacks reached Kremenchuk in July 1663, capturing Perevolochna, but eventually withdrew before actually taking the city. Another attempt followed in August, which failed. Finally, in August, Ivan Briukhovetsky led a campaign to reach Kremenchuk alongside Kyrylo Khlopov via Pereiaslav. During the siege, Kremenchuk was burned down, although the fortress was not taken since they withdrew after hearing of the Polish advance. In October, Briukhovetsky claimed to Muscovy that his forces had stormed, burned, and razed Kremenchuk while killing about 3,000 others and taking some prisoners. In 1666, Evliya Çelebi once again passed through Kremenchuk, in which he noted that despite reports from 1663, there still existed a two-tier fortification; although the Crimean Tatars had attempted to seize the fortress and set the town ablaze again, they were repelled. After 1667, with the signing of the Treaty of Andrusovo, Kremenchuk came under Muscovite control, although de facto the Cossack Hetmanate was still granted a level of autonomy within Muscovy. That same year, Kremenchuk came under the Myrhorod Regiment. The Poles still claimed Kremenchuk nominally, keeping the title of "starosta of Kremenchuk" for Jerzy Niemirycz, who passed on the title to the Jaskólski family, and after the Polish–Russian Peace Treaty (1686), the title still continued to be granted and used despite the Poles not having de facto control.

In the aftermath of the burning the development of Kremenchuk would stall for some time. Kremenchuk was only used as a garrison post for some troops in Poltava, although by the end of the The Ruin, more stabilisation would come with inhabitants including kompaniitsi and riflemen from Myrhonorod. During this time, Krylov (which would later be merged into Kremenchuk) would also begin to be resettled, alongside settlers appearing at Krukove. Kremenchuk was only mildly affected by the Great Northern War despite nearby Poltava and many neighbouring settlements being destroyed, with only Krylov being razed. A group of Cossacks loyal to the Swedes repeatedly attempted to take Kremenchuk, but they were captured by the Hetman Danylo Apostol, who executed some of the group or impaled them as traitors under the orders of Fyodor Alexeyevich Golovin.

== Imperial Russian revival ==
=== Capital of the Novorossiya Governorate ===
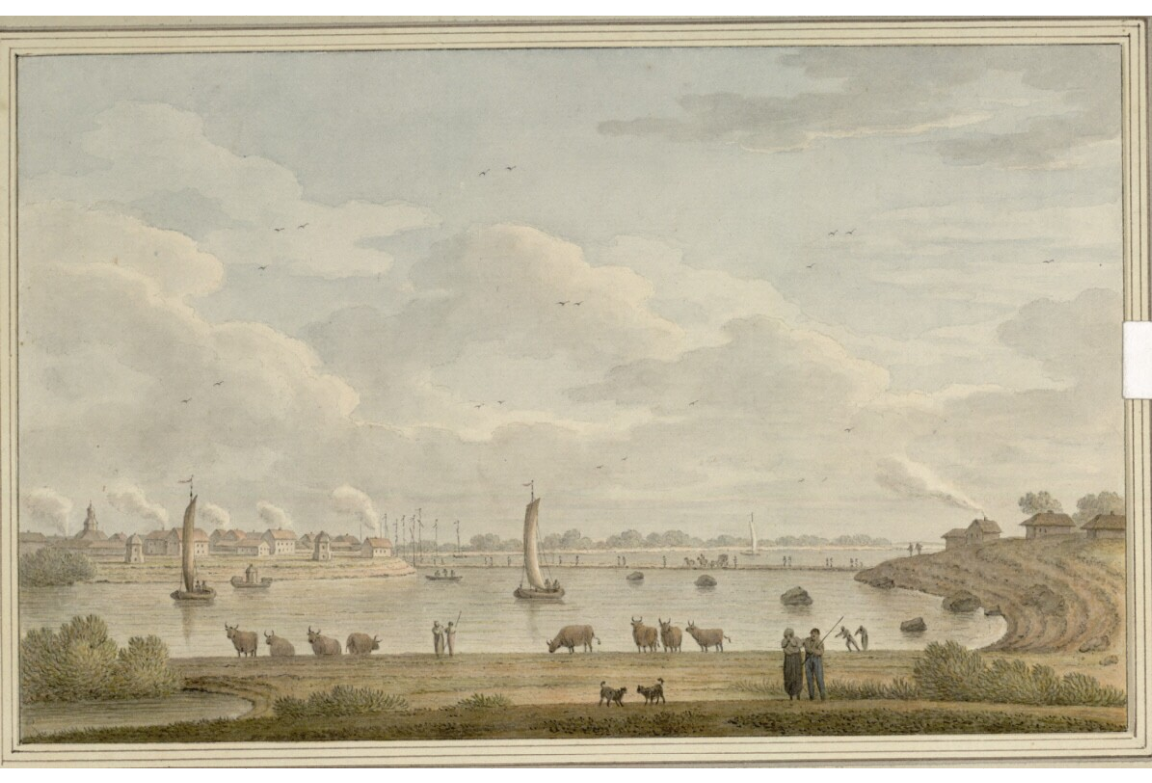
Painting of the city and port of Kremenchug in 1781.

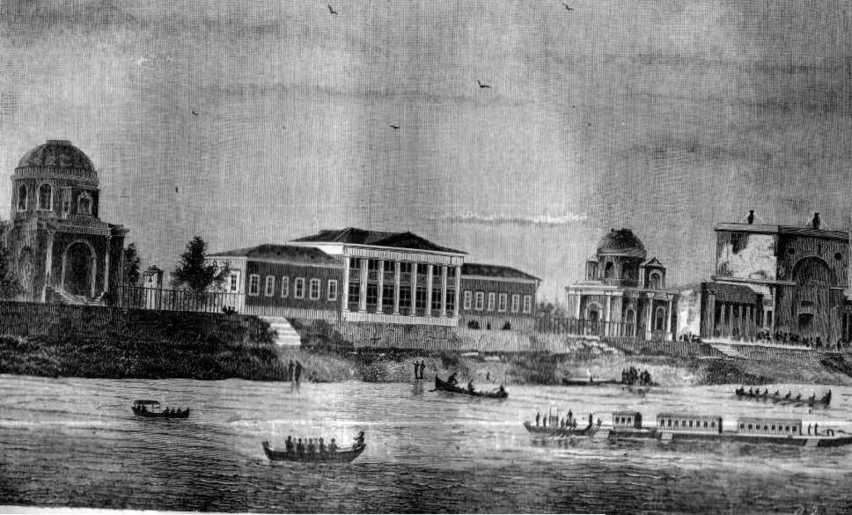
Kremenchug during a visit by Catherine II of Russia in 1787, shortly before the flood.

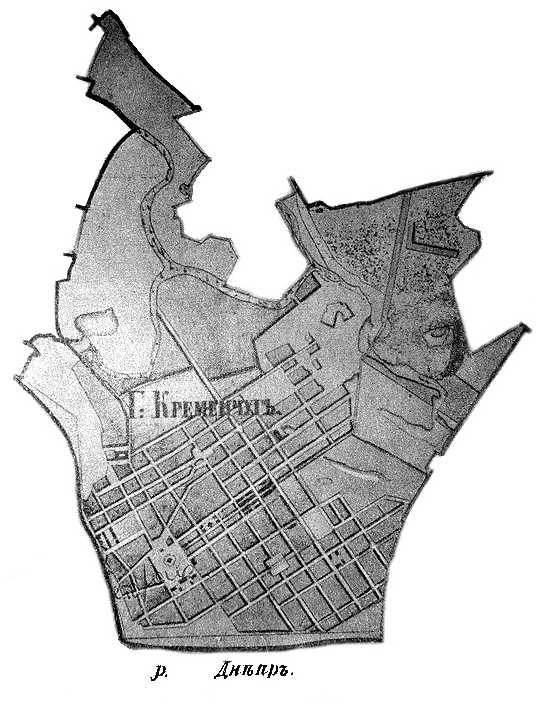
City place of Kremenchug c. late 1700s

Starting in the 1700s, Kremenchug was slowly revived, during which time the city became more known under the Russian name of Kremenchug, while still being the seat of the Kremenchug company of Myrhorod. During the Russo-Turkish War (1735–1739), Kremenchug took on greater importance as a hug and there were attempts to build bridges to it during the Russian defense. By 1748, the fortress at Kremenchug was an old castle with a posad and ramparts and three gates. Within the surrounding city were headquarters for staff and a saltpeter works with a market, and across the river in Kryukiv was also a small fortification. That year was the last renovation of the fortress before it eventually fell into disuse. Throughout the 50s, trade slowly shifted to becoming more important in Kremenchug with new customs houses opening up, although the city had to be reinforced multiple times over local raids. In 1752, Kryukiv was granted the title of small town. In 1764, Kremenchug became the seat of the 9th company of the Dnipro Pikiner Regiment.

With the rapid development of Kremenchug, the city was chosen to be the capital of the Novorossiya Governorate on 26 March 1765 after the liquidation of the Cossack Hetmanate. This same decree, noting that Kremenchug could probably not handle the traffic associated with this decision, financed new bridges from excess revenue. However, this did not mean that every Cossack approved of the decision, as many Cossacks in Kremenchug continued to remain angry that they were forced to become part of the Dnipro regiment and refused to participate in meetings and delegations. Together, the Cossacks in Kremenchug under Pavlo Denysenko demanded restoration of the previous Cossack status, also angry that many of the settlers from Slavo-Serbia had taken over things in Kremenchug from them. However, the Russian government refused to listen to their demands. Thus, lots of the Cossacks in Kremenchug took part in the Dnipro regiment's uprising of 1769-70, leading to them being brutally suppressed while many Cossacks were displaced by refugees from Tatar-prone areas. Despite the repopulation, the actual development of the city rapidly increased, especially from 1770, as noted during Johann Anton Güldenstädt's journies through Ukraine. Vasyl Zuiev, another traveler, also visited in 1781 and called Kremenchug a well-planned city with streets radiating from the fortress, with around 1,300 residents. A state school was opened in 1772 for officers alongside a girls' school and a private boarding school for nobles. A city government was also formed in Kremenchug with duma elections and a Magistrate, and the city was divided into quarters. In addition, the Jewish population rapidly surged from only seven in 1782 to 500 in 1797. In 1776, the capital was moved from Kremenchug to Yekaterinoslav, although after the dissolution of the governorate it briefly again became the administrative centre of the Yekaterinoslav Viceroyalty in 1783.

=== Decline in the late 1700s ===
However, this rapid surge of Kremenchug was hindered in 1784 when the city was struck with a plague. Ivan Synelnykov was appointed to manage the plague, and he divided the city into separate districts with wooden gates. The physician Danylo Samoylovych also arrived in June to help, and he advised fumigation. From around May to November 1784, 240 people died of around 8,000 people near the city, alongside many who died in the countryside but were not reported.

The city then began to recover during the Russo-Turkish War (1787–1792), when it again became an important logistics center and a shipyard was built near the river. This increased especially by 1789, when nearly all military supplies went through Kremenchug. However, yet again, Kremenchug was struck by disaster in May 1789 with a giant flood, which destroyed much of the city. In light of this, many administrative duties that Kremenchug had done were moved to Hradyzk which was formalised in June 1789, while Kremenchug was demoted back to a non-administrative town. In 1796, the devastated town was moved to the Little Russia Governorate, before finally settling int he Poltava Governorate. According to German traveler Johann Georg Kohl in 1838, the decision to remove Kremenchug as an administrative seat led to the decline of the military significance of the city and the permanent shift to being a trading centre instead.

=== Poltava Governorate and 1800s ===
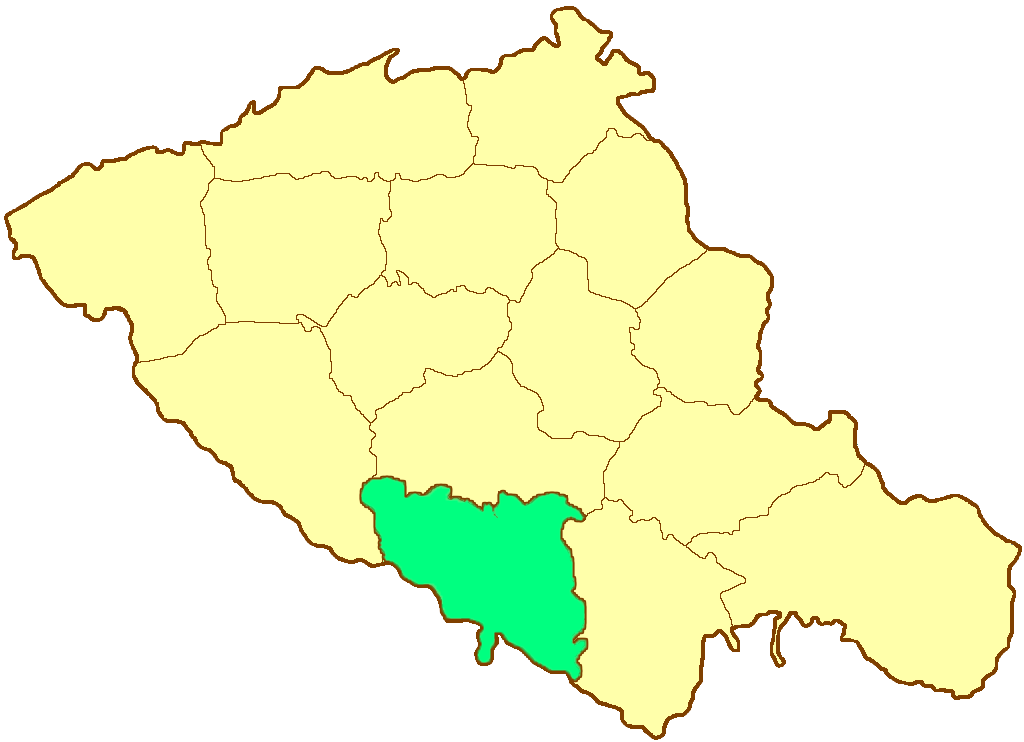
Map of Poltava Governorate with Kremenchug highlighted.

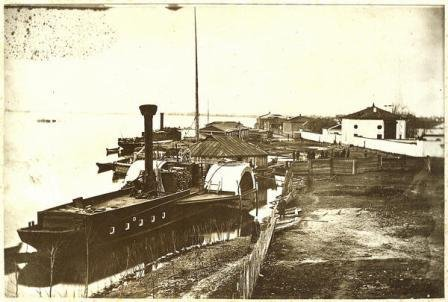
Embarkment in Kremenchug after the flood of 1877.

Starting in the early 1800s, Alexander I of Russia approved resettling German people, who were largely poor colonists, into Kremenchug. After settling in 1809, a colonist known as Helitser founded a cloth factory, while another named Ruprecht founded a leather factory, with these colonial enterprises quickly becoming important to Kremenchug's economy. In 1834, Kremenchug became the second city after Odessa in Ukraine to open a commodity exchange. At the time, Kremenchug was dominated by Old Believers, with a slight number of Lutherans due to the German colonists, although by 1845 this shifted after persecution of the Old Believers and by the 1860s the population was virtually non-existent. Due to the high risk of flooding, as seen in 1789, in 1844 a new plan was drawn up for a wall made of stone on the river and to also pave the shoreline, which was followed up by a survey in 1848 that also proposed a dam.

Starting in 1859, the city's first public library was founded, although it was poorly maintained, and the following year two Sunday schools opened up. Despite this progress, in 1861 Oleksandr Konysky wrote under the pen name "Перехoдовець" that Kremenchug was a poorly maintained city that was only cleaned when important visitors came through, and was reliant on timber trading via the river. Two decades later, in 1880, the Austrian brothers Bernard and Georg Friedrich Orenshtein purchased a leather factory and renamed it to "Б.М.Оренштейн і К", which became the largest leather processing enterprise near the Dnipro soon after. That decade, half-dams and eventually full stone dams were finally constructed near Kremenchug near the Chervoniy kamin reef. By the end of the century, the Kremenchug river pier ranked from 36th to 38th in total cargo volume transported among all Russian rivers, with around 20 million poods of cargo going through Kremenchug annually, most of it timber. In addition, the 1897 Russian census recorded that Kremenchug had a population of 58,648 people, which was actually larger than Poltava, which continued to rapidly grow to 70,000 by 1913, with a majority of the citizens being Jews due to being located in the Pale of Settlement.

=== Revolution of 1905 and early 1900s ===
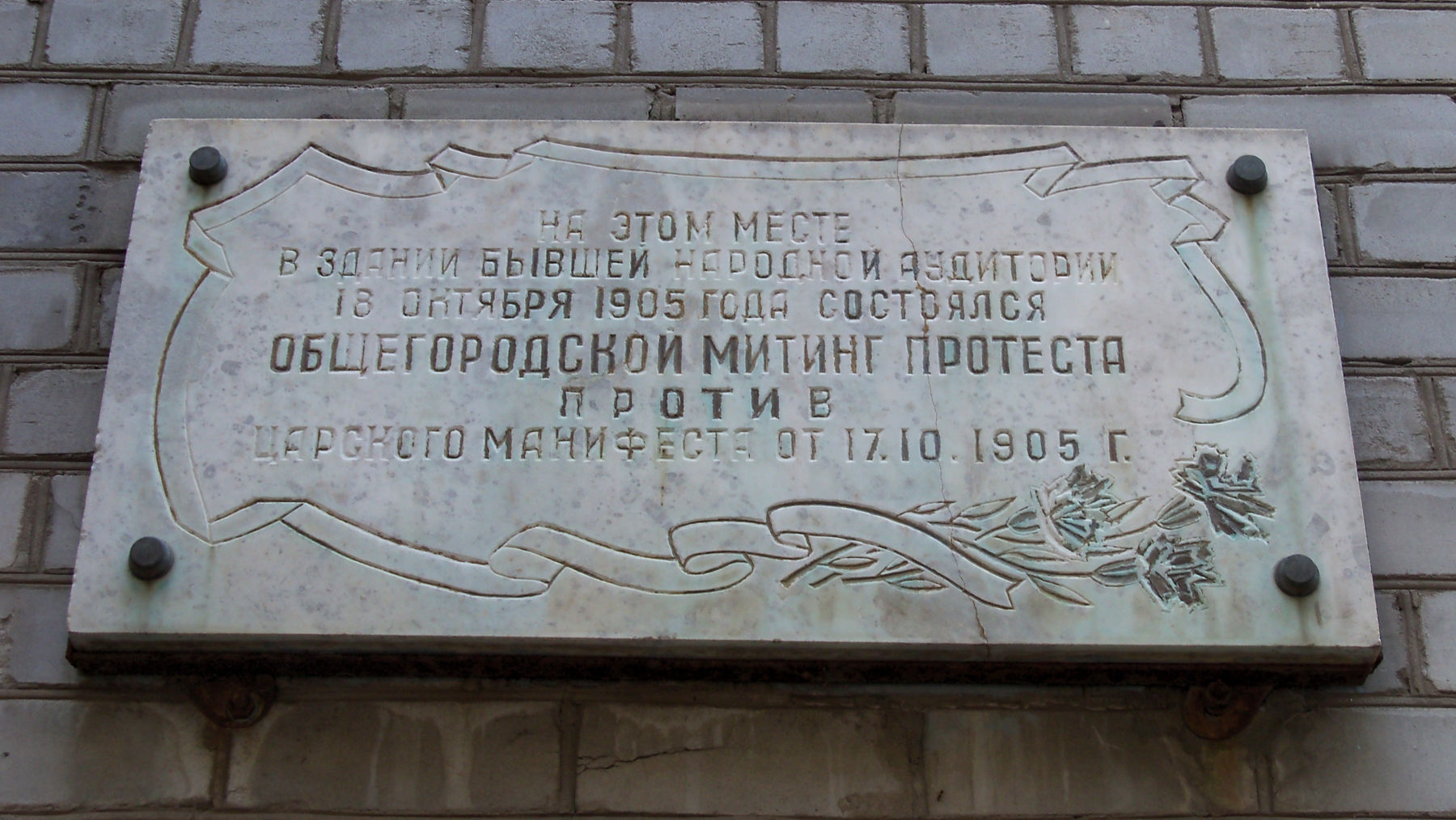
Commemorative plaque to the 1905 revolution in Kremenchug.

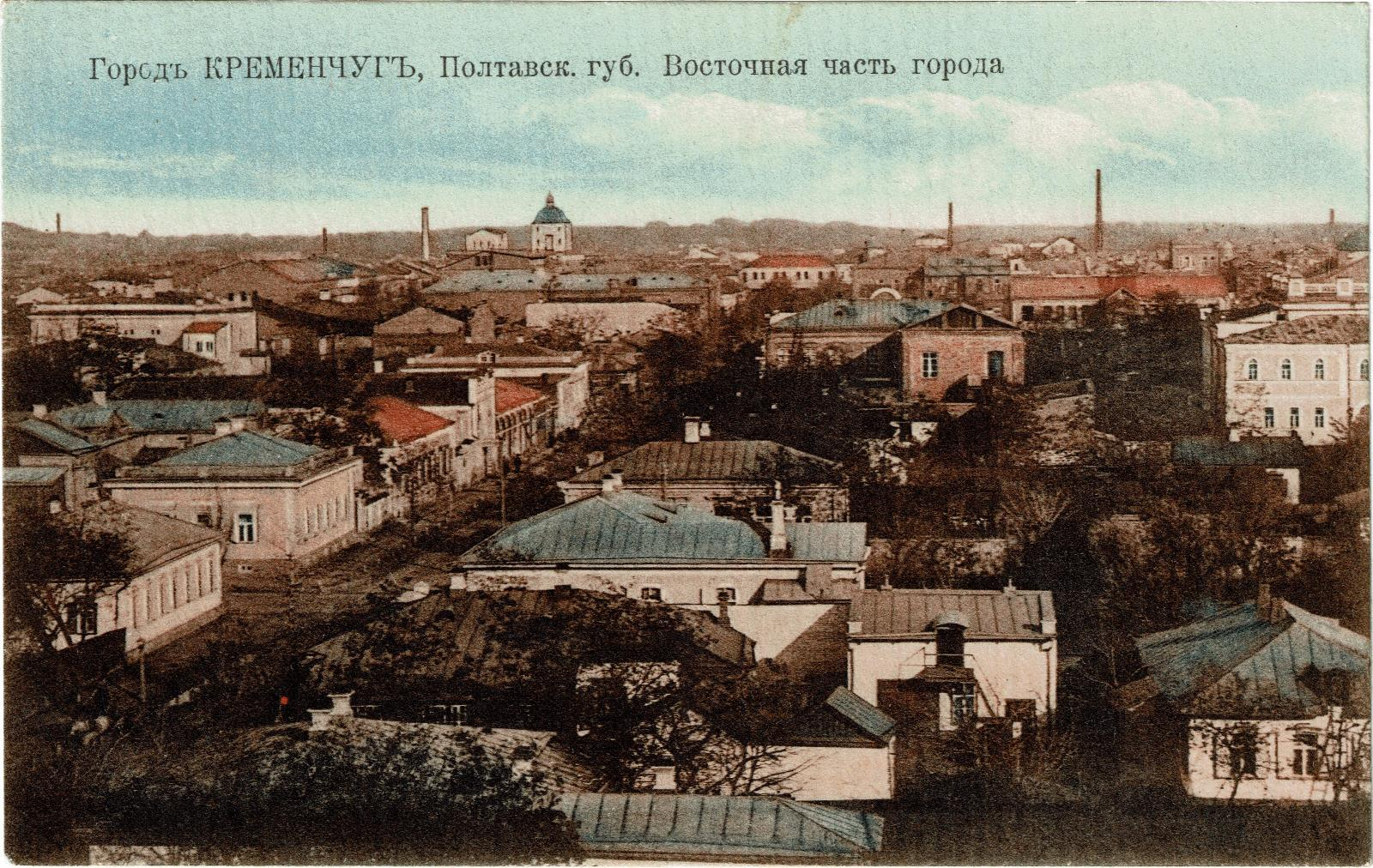
General view of Kremenchug in a postcard dated from 1905 to 1917.

By the start of the 1905 Russian Revolution, Kremenchug had 50 factories, although the average worker was paid far less than in Russia and workdays were 14-15 hours. With the start of the revolution, word reached Kremenchug in early February 1905, leading to around 1,400 workers going on strike, which was agitated by leaflets that called for an armed struggle. Grigory Petrovsky himself also told workers on Pushkin Street to fight with weapons. A peasant congress was convened in Kremenchug to aid the revolution starting in October 1905, although many members were killed after the October Manifesto when police opened fire at one of the meetings on Pushkin Street. By December, workers in Kremenchug returned to striking, and together they formed a Soviet, which condemned the manifesto. Due to this unrest, martial law was declared on 21 December 1905, with the governor of the uezd banning any revolutionary papers and leaflets shortly thereafter and exiling RSDLP members. After this, the revolution slowly tapered off in Kremenchug in light of the failed Moscow uprising of 1905, although small groups continued to work as late as 1907 in the neighbouring villages. Strikes were again renewed from 1910 to 1912, leading to some organisations receiving high wages in 1912.

After the start of World War I, Kremenchug became a refugee destination, especially after the Great Retreat in 1915. Refugees were placed in both the parishes of Kremenchug and in neighbouring villages temporarily. Despite this, life still continued, and in 1915 the new Holy Trinity Church was opened alongside the large cinema called "Colosseum", which became a gathering spot and drew large crowds. In addition, the troupe of A. Chinizelli regularly visited Kremenchug. However, Kremenchug soon became involved in the anti-war movement. This was most evident in November 1916, when seven thousand soldiers stationed in Kremenchug refused to go to the front, instead starting a mutiny and deserting, which the Cossack officers did nothing to stop.

== Soviet era ==
=== Russian Civil War ===
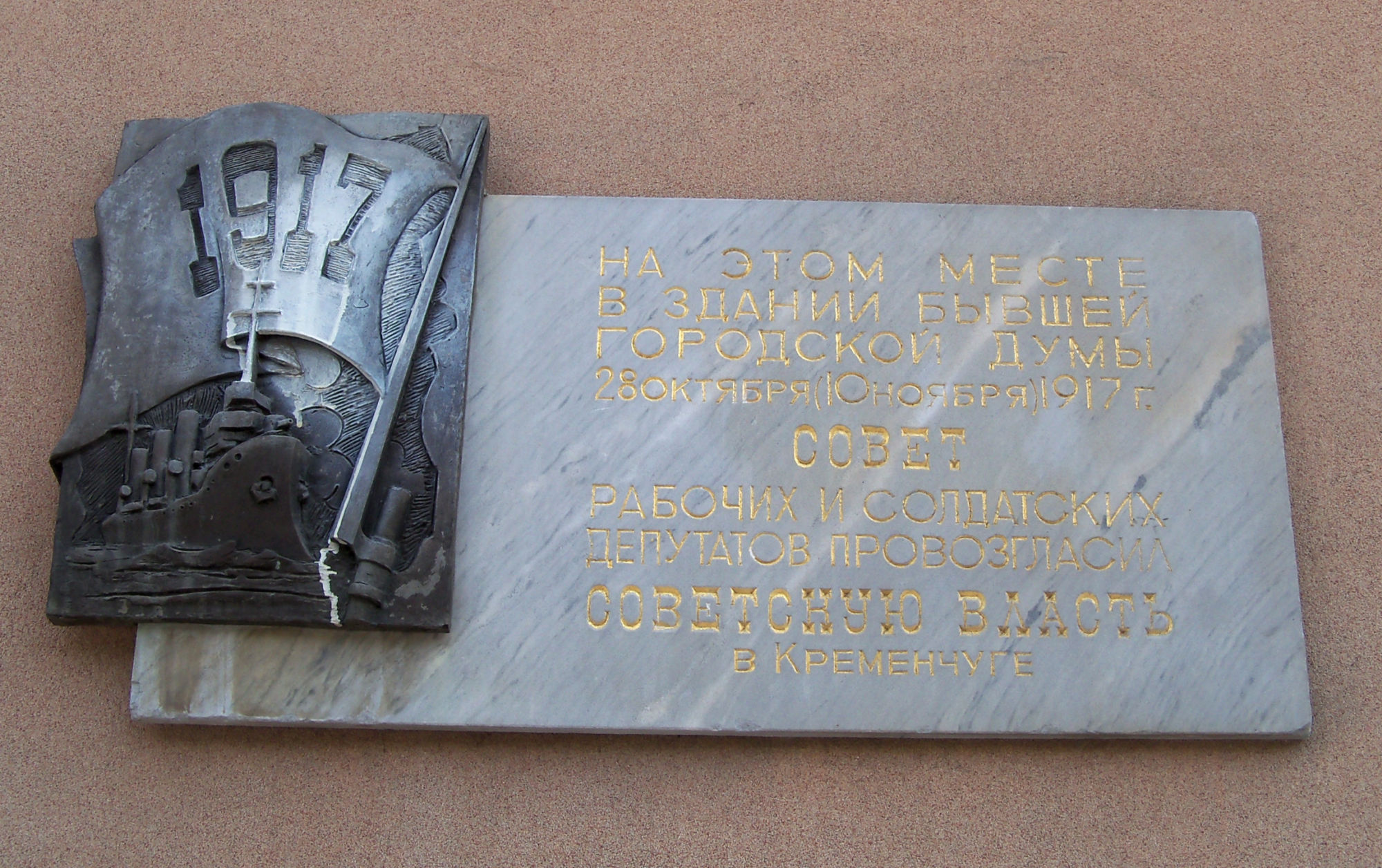
Plaque to the establishment of Soviet power during the civil war

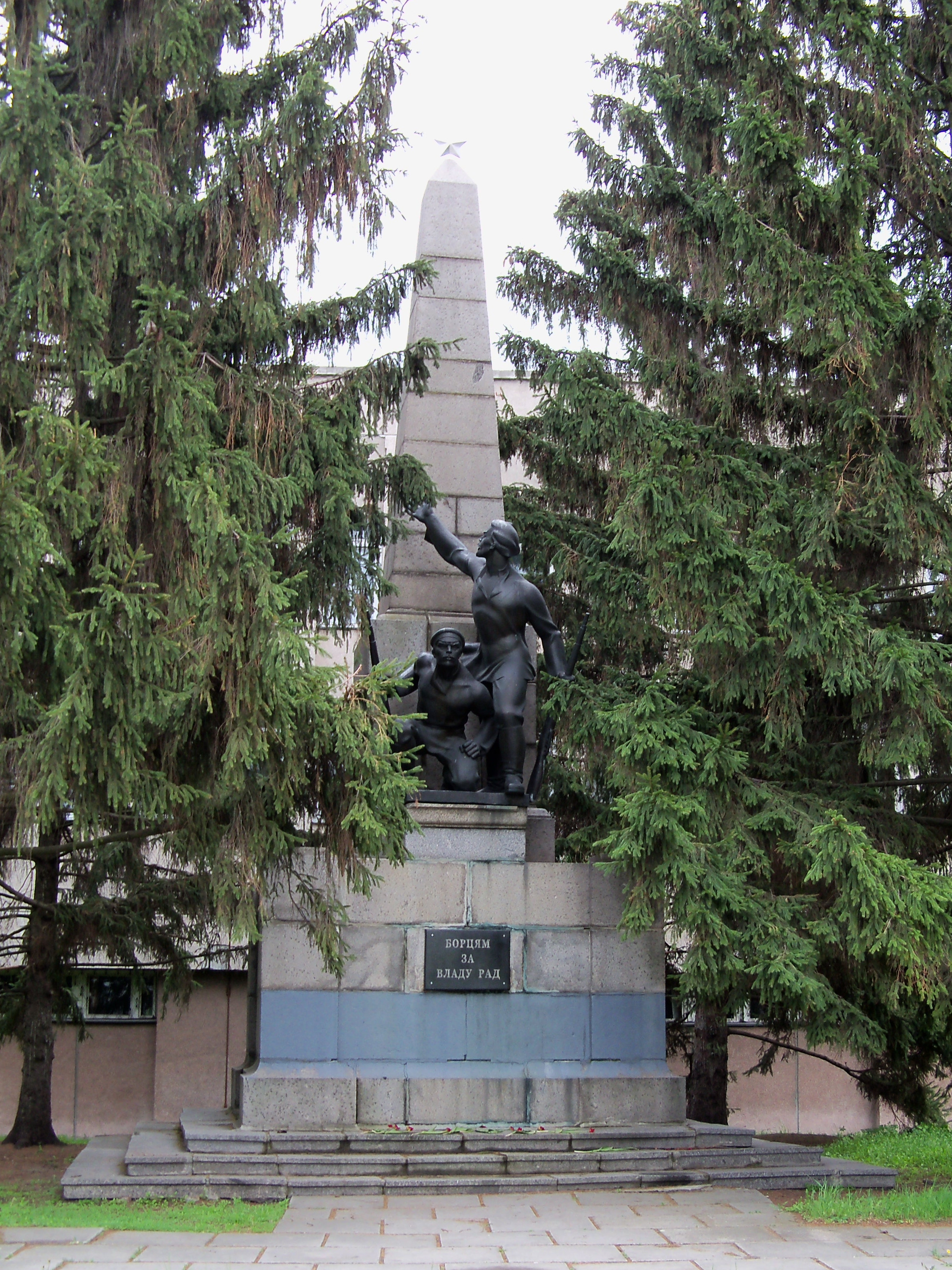
Mass grave of fighters who established Soviet power.

==== 1917 ====
After the February Revolution and the Abdication of Nicholas II, Kremenchug would be highly receptive to radicalism over moderation, according to Vyrsky, because it was an economic hub. As he notes, even the 15,000-strong garrison was receptive to revolution over the events of 1916. Thus, on 2 March 1917, the first large demonstration of workers in favour of the revolution within the Poltava Governorate began in Kremenchug, with thousands marching to the duma, storming the prison, and forming their own militia. At this time, the RSDRP and, illegally, the Jewish Bund had strong favour in the city, while in later March a Soviet of Workers' and Soldiers' Deputies was formed. The Soviet grew very popular very quickly in response to another massive flood in 1917, which destroyed around 4,000 buildings, and a detachment of cadets from Vilna had to be brought in, as the Soviets did attempt to help with the rescue and resettlement efforts. Unlike neighbouring Poltava and Kyiv, Vyrskyi notes that pro-Ukrainian nationalist viewpoints were not that popular, with many who supported it being state employees and soldiers. Ukrainian nationalism in the city was not prevalent in the Soviet, and instead was mostly concentrated in the duma, as members tried to push for implementing the Ukrainian language more. The provisioning of power is most evident in the local elections held that August, in which 26 of the seats were won by the bloc of RSDRP, Jewish Bund, and Yednannia, 24 were won by the block of the SRs and Poalei Zion, 14 went to pro-Ukrainians, and 7 went to the Jewish National Democratic Union.

After the failed Kornilov affair later that month, a Committee of Revolutionary Defense was formed in Kremenchug, while a Red Guard detachment under the Bolsheviks seized the railway and telegraph stations. At the same time, with this happening, the socialists started to split apart, with the Bolsheviks soon gaining power due to defections. After the October Revolution, a bloody confrontation started between the Free Cossacks and the Red Guard. Nevertheless, the still nominally powerful Duma rejected the Bolshevik takeover, warning of civil war, although the Bolsheviks refuted this and took over all power in the city. However, Bolshevik control would not last long, as at the end of November the declared Ukrainian People's Republic sent their 1st Bohdanivsky Regiment to take power in the city, which was successful. During the brief UPR control, Vyrskyi called the population largely indifferent to Ukrainian control, except the Jews who feared a pogrom would happen (it would not).

==== 1918 ====
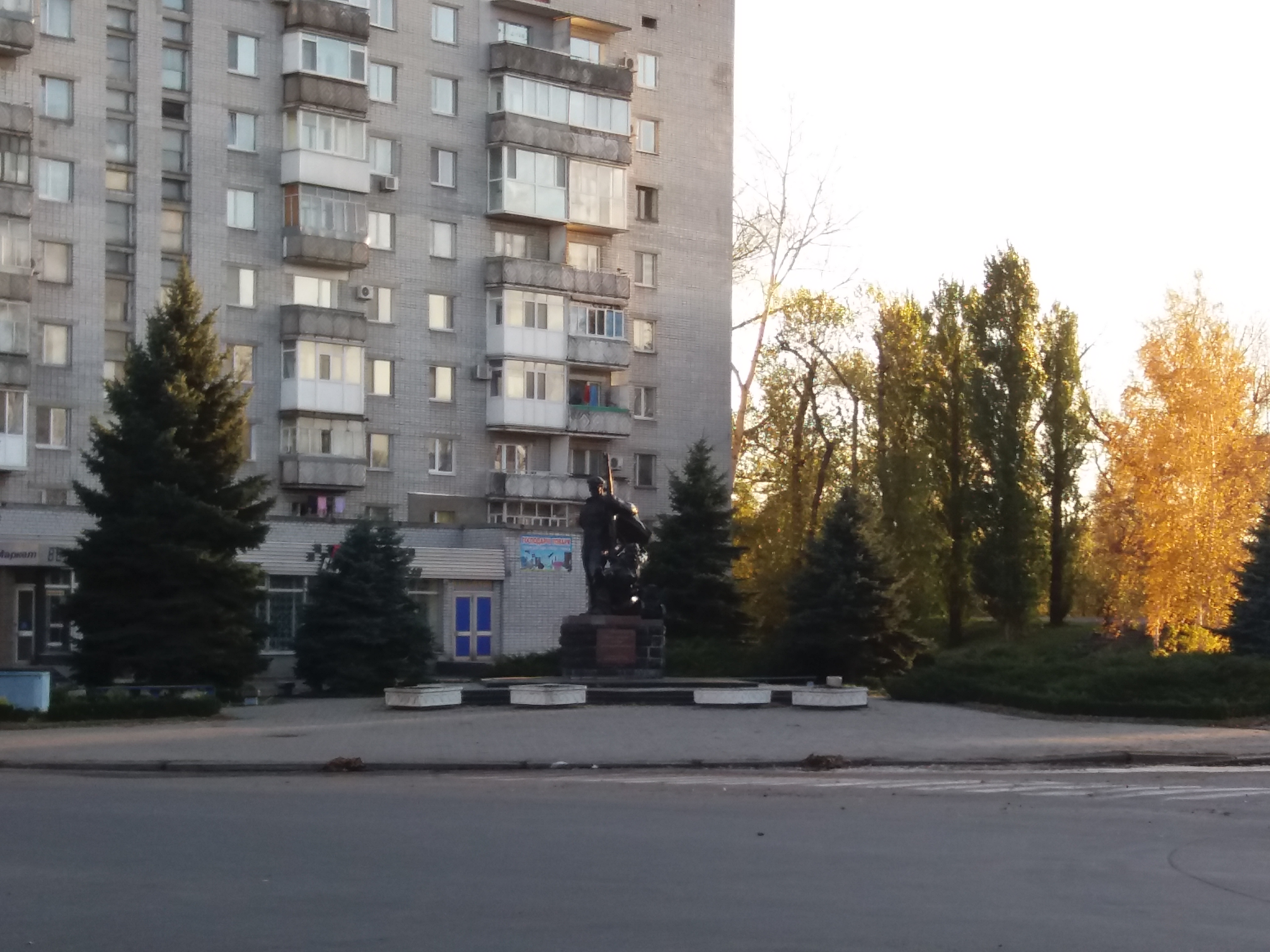
Monument to the sailors of the Dnipro flotilla. The unit was stationed in Kremenchuk, and later took part in the fight against the Whites.

With the Bolsheviks quickly gaining ground in early January, the local Kremenchug Bolsheviks attempted to retake the city on their own, which failed after the 36th Orel Infantry Regiment, who were coming in from Romania, gave battle and easily defeated them. However, on 9 January, the Liubotyn group under Muravyov reached the city, and they issued an ultimatum to surrender which was shot down. Instead, the Ukrainians took up a defense, although after six hours of battle the Ukrainians were defeated and the Bolsheviks started a revkom in the city. New Ukrainian troops were then brought in from Romania and retook the city afterwards within a few days, but then on 26 January the Bolsheviks under Ivan Kulyk again recaptured the city. During the last attempt, the Bolsheviks had many reinforcements, with an armoured train, Red Guard detachments from Kharkiv, Dnipro, Poltava, and Zaporizhzhia. With Kremenchug now under temporary Bolshevik control, Revehuk says that the Red Guards started openly stealing things in the city, although eventually the revkom intervened and arrested some of the more senior officers. In addition, some more radical parties started popping up again, although according to Vyrskyi the Bolsheviks started using intimidation tactics against "opponents," so the Bolsheviks had little appeal to regular residents.

With the signing of the Treaty of Brest-Litovsk, the Bolsheviks ceded their right to Ukraine. The Imperial German Army then quickly reached Kremenchug via Yelysavethrad, with the Red Guard detachment being vastly underprepared, as most of the Soviet power was concentrated in Poltava. The combined German and Ukrainian forces retook Kremenchug with little resistance on 25 March 1918, beginning the German occupation of Kremenchug. However, unlike other cities, the German presence was only relatively minor, with the UPR taking over most of the power. It is generally noted that democratic institutions such as the duma welcomed UPR power over the Bolsheviks, while viewing the Germans negatively. Much like the Bolsheviks, the Ukrainians resorted to intimidation tactics, such as flogging Jews, although not actually beginning a pogrom, which generated protests as the Jews felt like the UPR's promises of autonomy were not being respected. UPR power would not last long, however, as the Ukrainian State (Hetmanate) took over, which was, similarly to the Germans, viewed negatively. However, conflict between local conflicts between the Germans and Ukrainians started that spring over a burial, culminating in the Germans arresting the mayor and some other board members. Many members of the public expressed outrage and disapproval over the German actions, although the Germans ignored them, while the Hetmanate afterwards started to consolidate and adopt authoritarianism in the city. By mid-October, the Duma ceased operations although it had long been declining.

In mid-November, the Anti-Hetman Uprising began, with the Germans declaring neutrality while General Petriv in the city started trying to attract volunteers and mobilise while beginning the defense of the city. This proved futile, and by 28 November 1918, the UPR retook the city, with the German forces withdrawing shortly thereafter due to the Central Powers defeat in World War I. With democracy returned, the Duma was restored, which Vyrskyi said many citizens approved of as the Directory promised to respect the rights of all, giving allocations of seats to most parties in the city. By December, most of the self-government bodies resumed, although as both the Whites and Bolsheviks advanced, security became a top concern and a militia was started while men were mobilised. However, by late December, friction restarted between the government and duma, which culminated on 19 December 1918 when a passing detachment of soldiers surrounded the local workers, union, and Jewish clubs and arrested 60 people.

==== 1919 ====
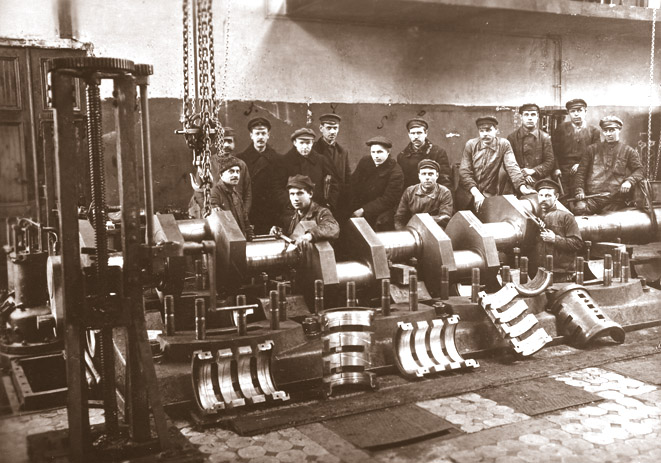
Restoration work being done in Kremenchug in 1919.

With the start of the 1919 Soviet invasion of Ukraine following the annulment of the Treaty of Brest-Litovsk, the city duma, despite the past incidents, attempted to form an effective militia against the Bolsheviks. The nearby stationed Zaporizhian Corps, however, were defeated by mid-January and withdrew across the Dnipro, and its leader, Colonel Bolbochan, was arrested by the UPR for being responsible, according to Petliura. On 1 February 1919, the Bolsheviks reoccupied Kremenchug. According to Vyrskyi, this occupation by the Bolsheviks was received more well than in 1918 because the Bolsheviks were able to present themselves as liberators with land reforms, especially as segments of the population were alienated away from hopes that they had previously had that the Entente would intervene. A campaign then began to nationalise the industry and start grain requisition, which the peasants did not approve of.

Regardless, by May, the previously Bolshevik-allied military leader Nykyfor Hryhoriv turned on the Bolsheviks after publishing a Universal, igniting the Hryhoriv Uprising. Although centered near Kherson, Kremenchug became one of the first targets of the uprising, and by 11 May Hryhoriv forces reached the outskirts of Kremenchug and took the city due to the defection of the local guard. Shortly thereafter, from 13-14 May 1919, a pogrom was started by the forces, who killed 150 Jews and communists in Kremenchug itself and 10 more in Kriukiv. As recalled by a local newspaper, the Jews had already known that Hryhoriv's forces had committed pogroms in other cities once they reached them, and on 13 May armed men began dividing the city into sectors and hunting down Jews and Communists. The uprising would not last long, though, as the Bolsheviks under the command of Kliment Voroshilov began a quick offensive with many Hyrhoriv forces simply surrendering rather than fighting. However, unlike other cities that had taken part in the uprising, the battle of the city would actually be notable as Hyrhoriv personally commanded a full assault on the Bolsheviks on 19 May, although it ultimately failed. The Bolsheviks retook the city on either the 19th, according to Adams, or the 20th, according to Vyrskyi.

After the Bolshevik defeat at the Battle for the Donbas, the pro-Russian White movement began to move to Kremenchug. Knowing that the city could possibly be taken, the Bolsheviks left behind 80 rifles with ammo to start a partisan resistance that could organise an uprising against the Whites. The city was also the place of coordination for organising underground cells in other cities. Meanwhile, the Cheka began a Red Terror campaign, killing former officers whom they believed could be pro-White in the future, including Anton Shariy, who helped with anti-German and Ukrainian State resistance and was widely regarded as a local hero. By August 1919, the Whites took Kremenchug, which was actually viewed positively by many citizens due to the Cheka's actions. Despite this, due to preparations, the Whites faced fierce resistance by the underground, as they penetrated intelligence offices and turned battalions away from the Whites. In November, the Whites began another pogrom in Kremenchug, alongside killing six girls they associated with the Komsomol, which quickly turned the citizens away from the Whites also. In early December, the Bolsheviks united the nearby villages and Kremenchug to form a united detachment that could retake Kremenchug, which alarmed the defending 136th Taganrog Infantry Regiment. On 16 December, the Bolsheviks ordered the underground to seize Kremenchug, which they quickly did against demoralised Whites, although the underground refused to cooperate with the Bolsheviks afterwards and dispersed after claiming loyalty to Petliura. After the Whites fled, on 20 December, they blew up the bridge across the Dnipro and killed 27 political prisoners.

==== Maps ====
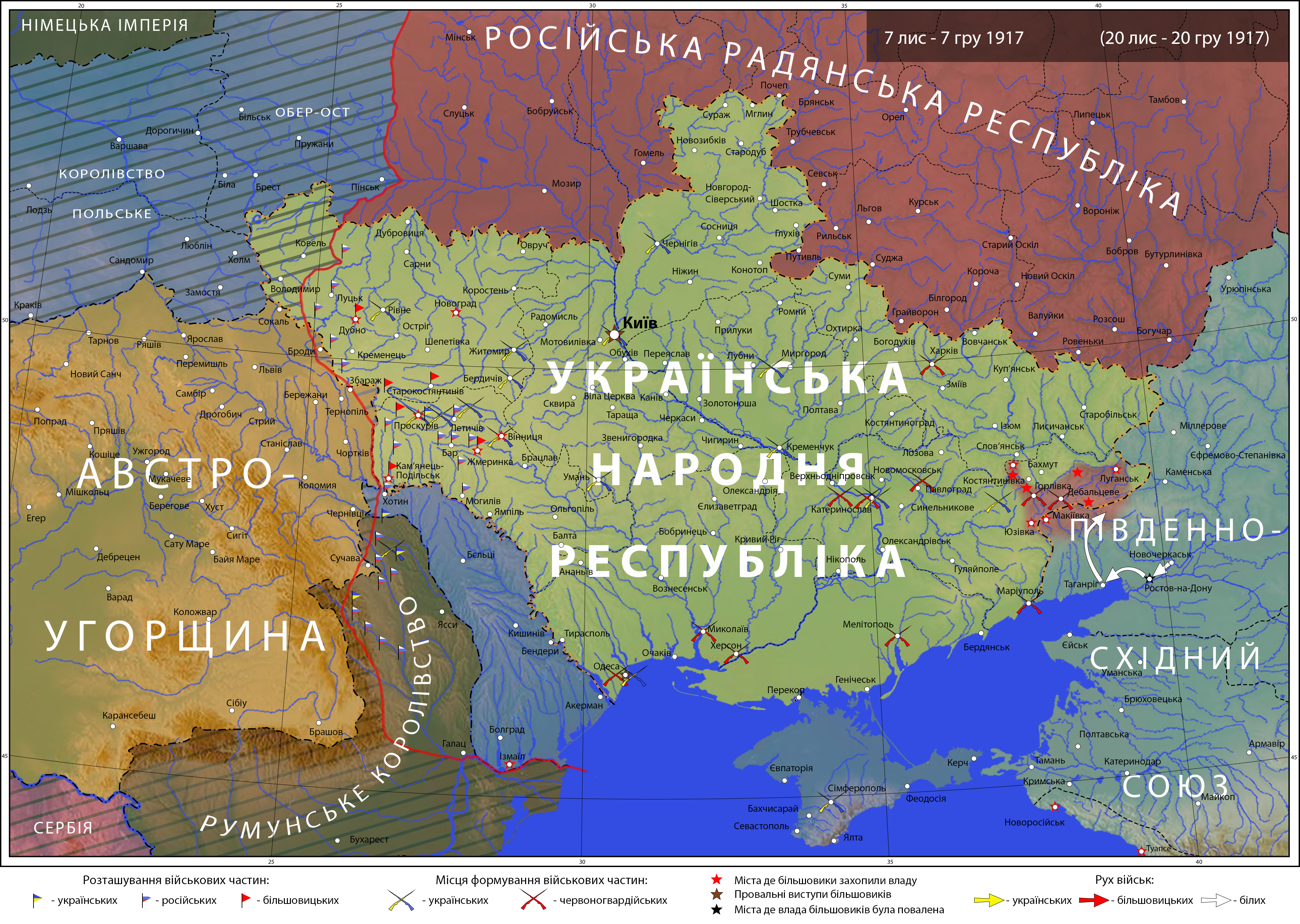
Situation in Ukraine from November to December 1917. The UPR has taken control of Kremenchuk.

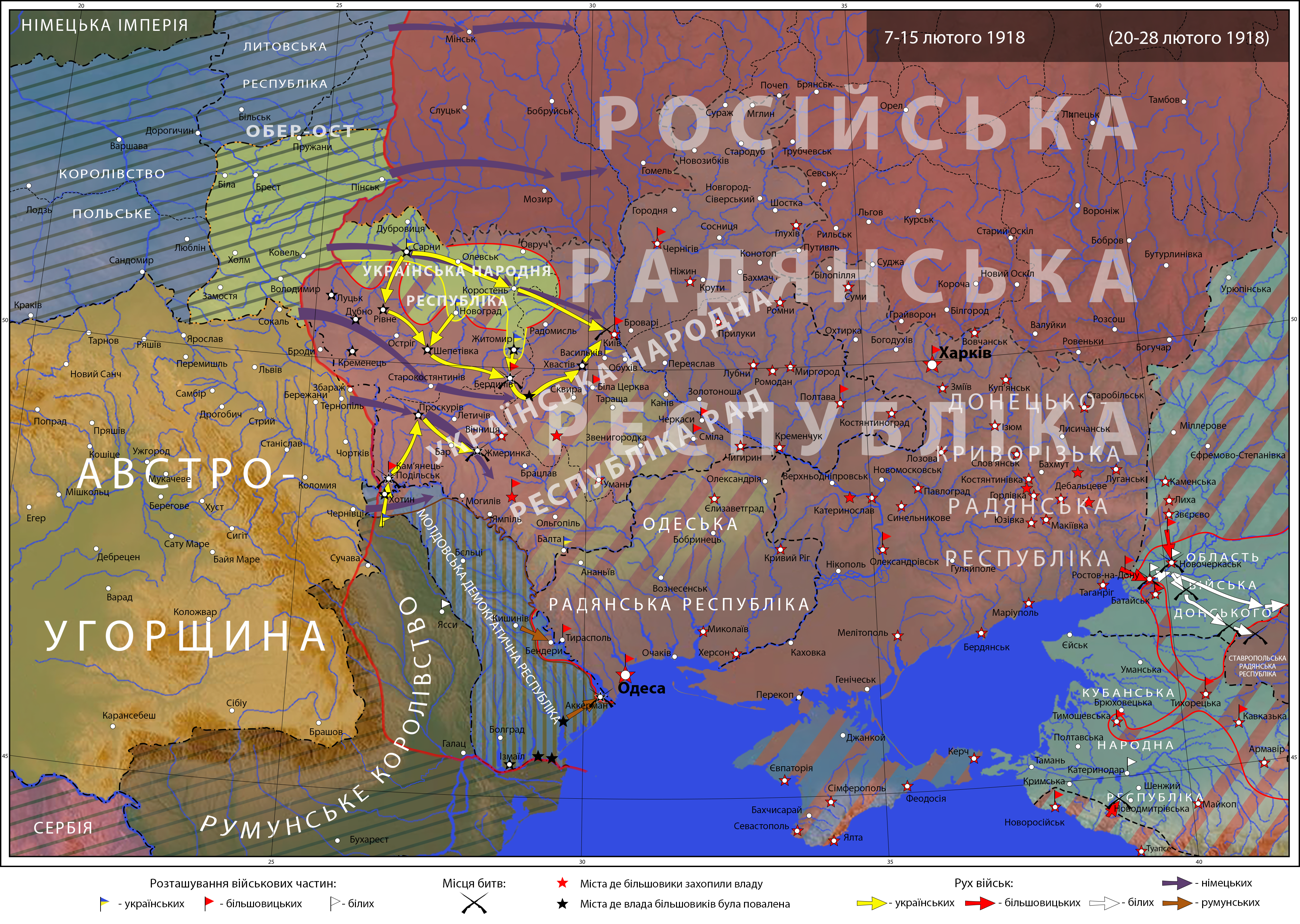
Situation in Ukraine in late February 1918. The Bolsheviks have taken Kremenchuk, although it in the midst of a battle.

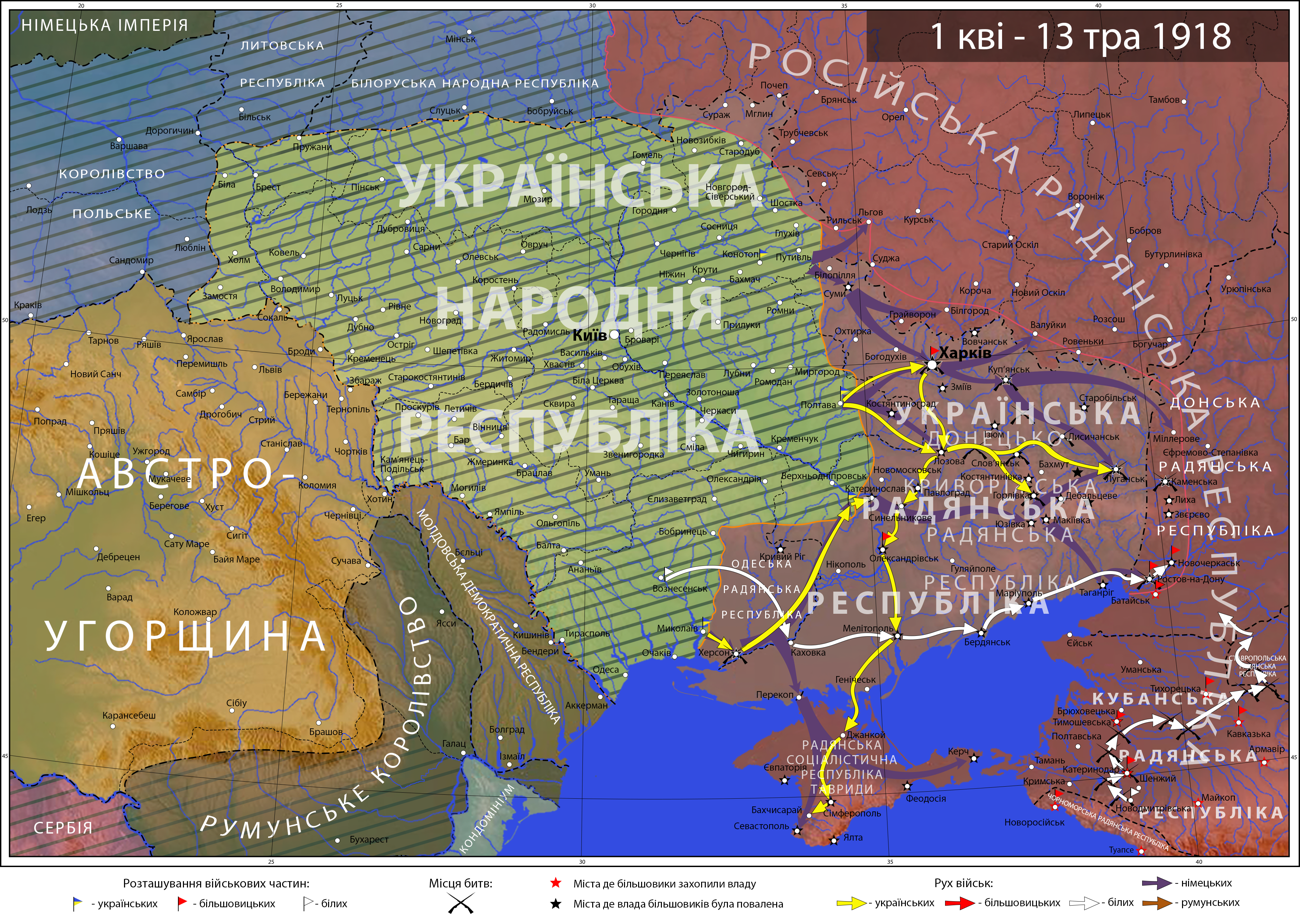
Situation in Ukraine in April 1918. The UPR, together with the Central Powers, retake Kremenchuk.

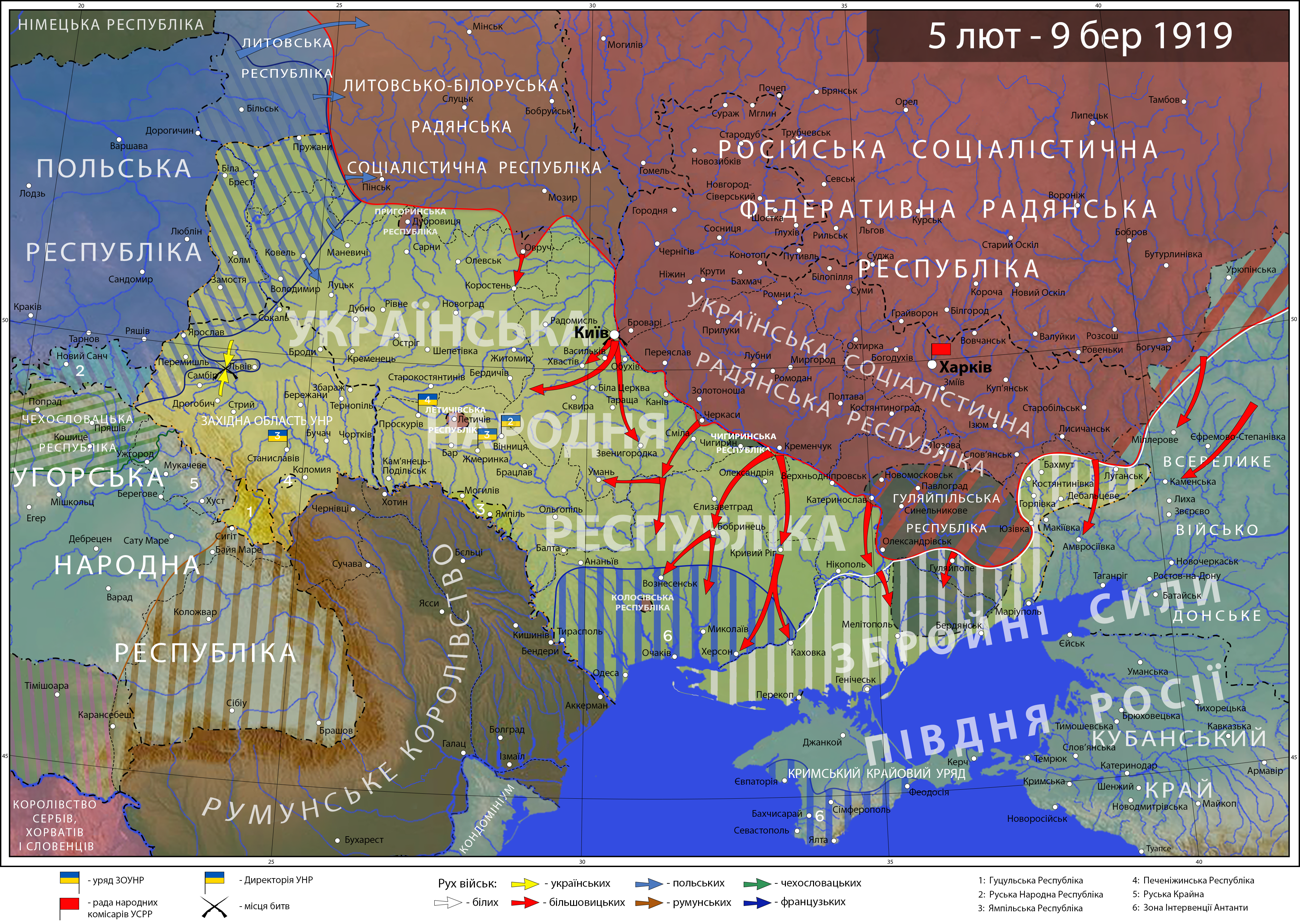
Situation in January 1919. After the Central Powers troops retreated following their defeat in World War I, Bolshevik troops enter the city, although it is near the frontlines.

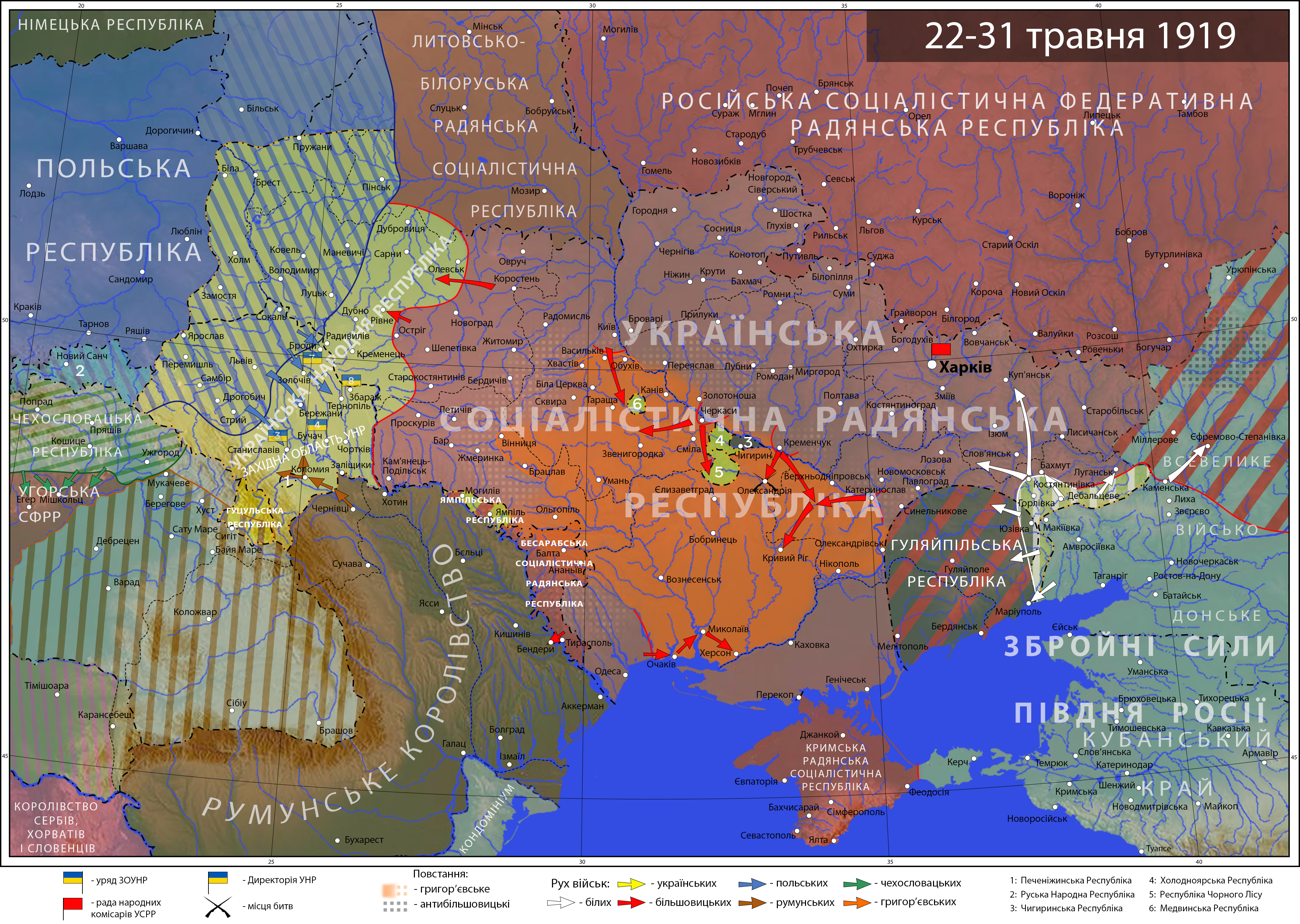
Situation in May 1919. Nykyfor Hryhoriv turns on the Bolsheviks and leads a peasant uprising known as the Hryhoriv Uprising, marked in orange, which leads to the city being contested.

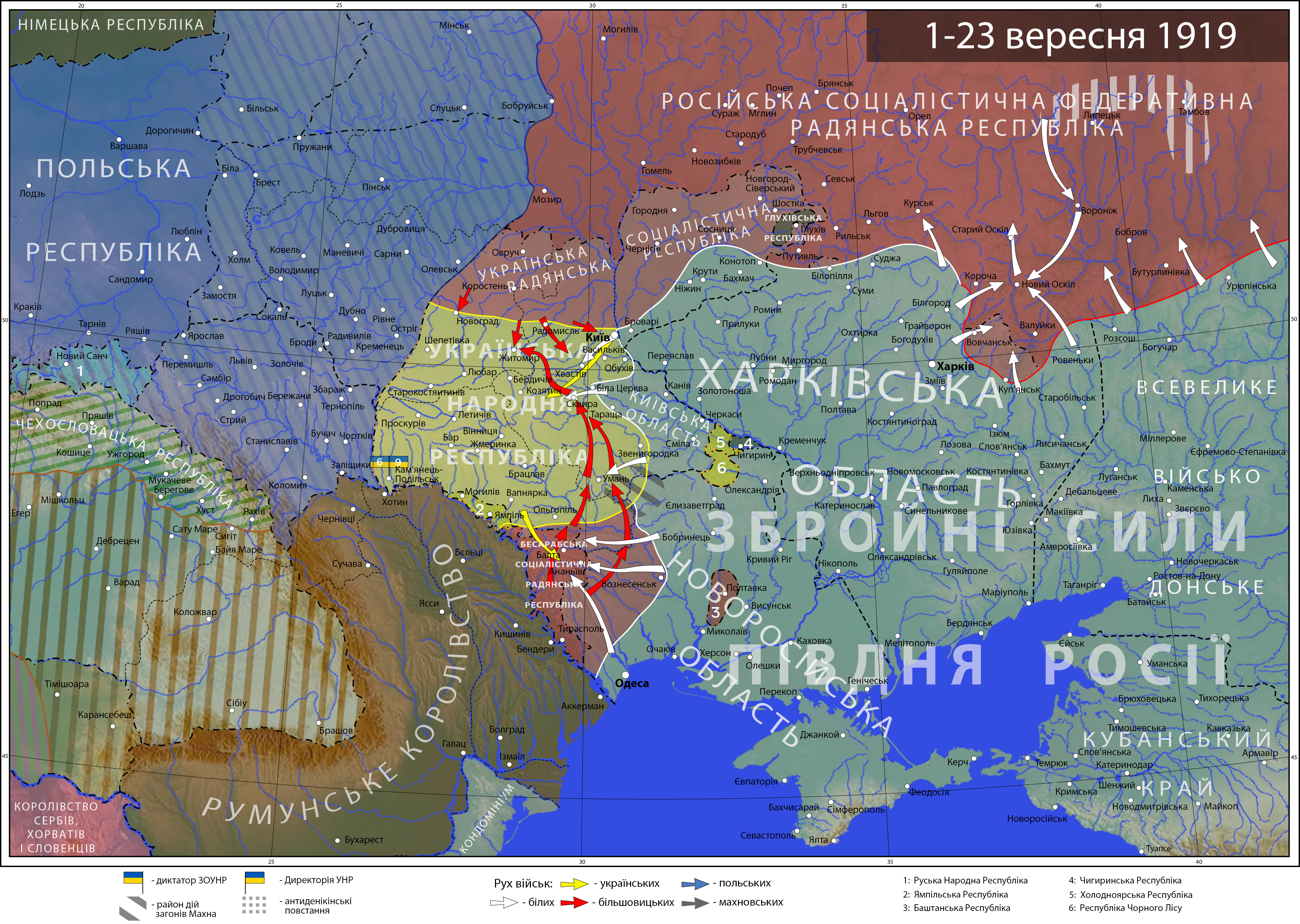
Situation in September 1919. The White movement begins an offensive, seizing control of the city from the Bolsheviks.

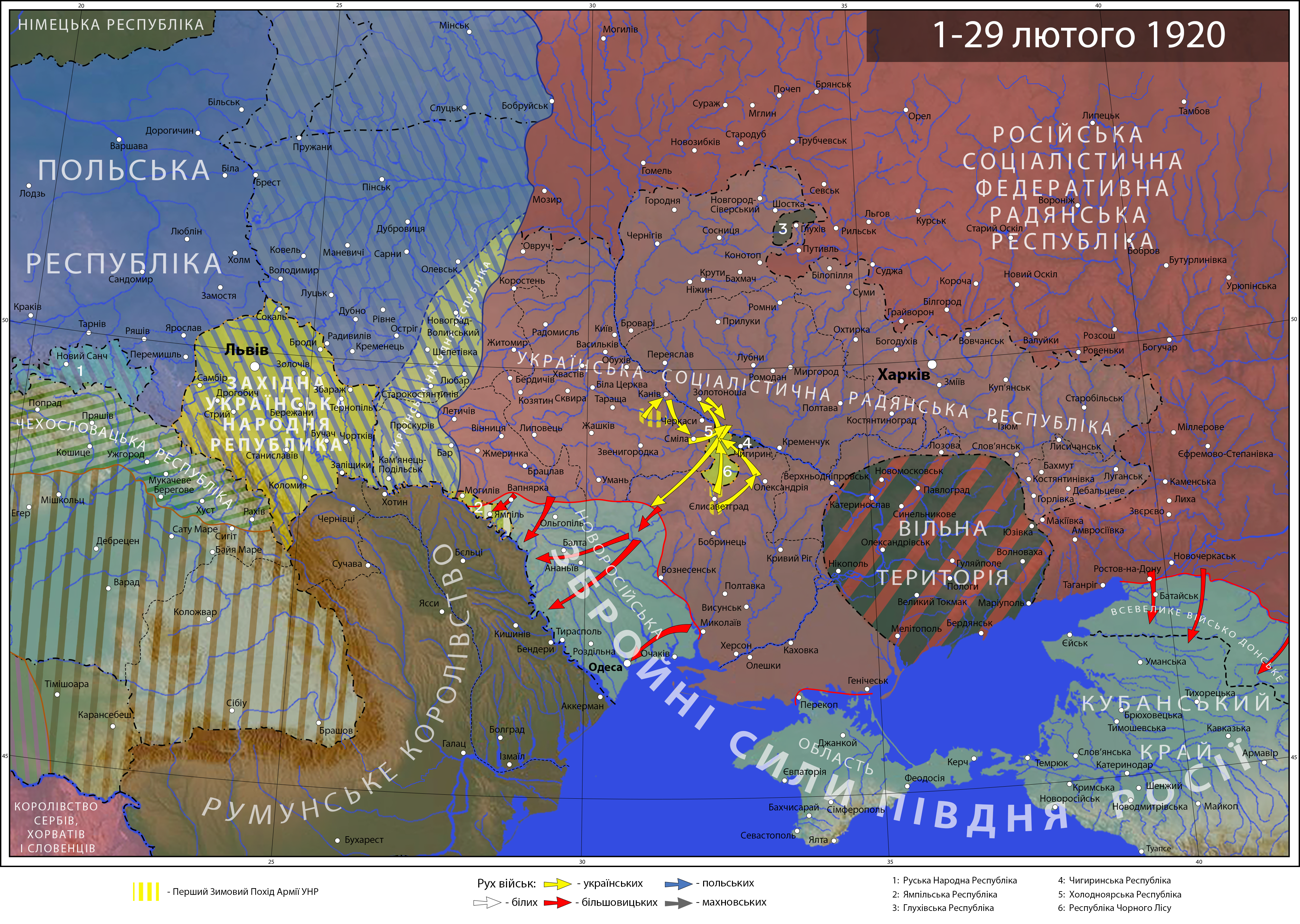
Situation in February 1920. The Bolsheviks have seized power in Kremenchuk for the last time.

=== Interwar period ===
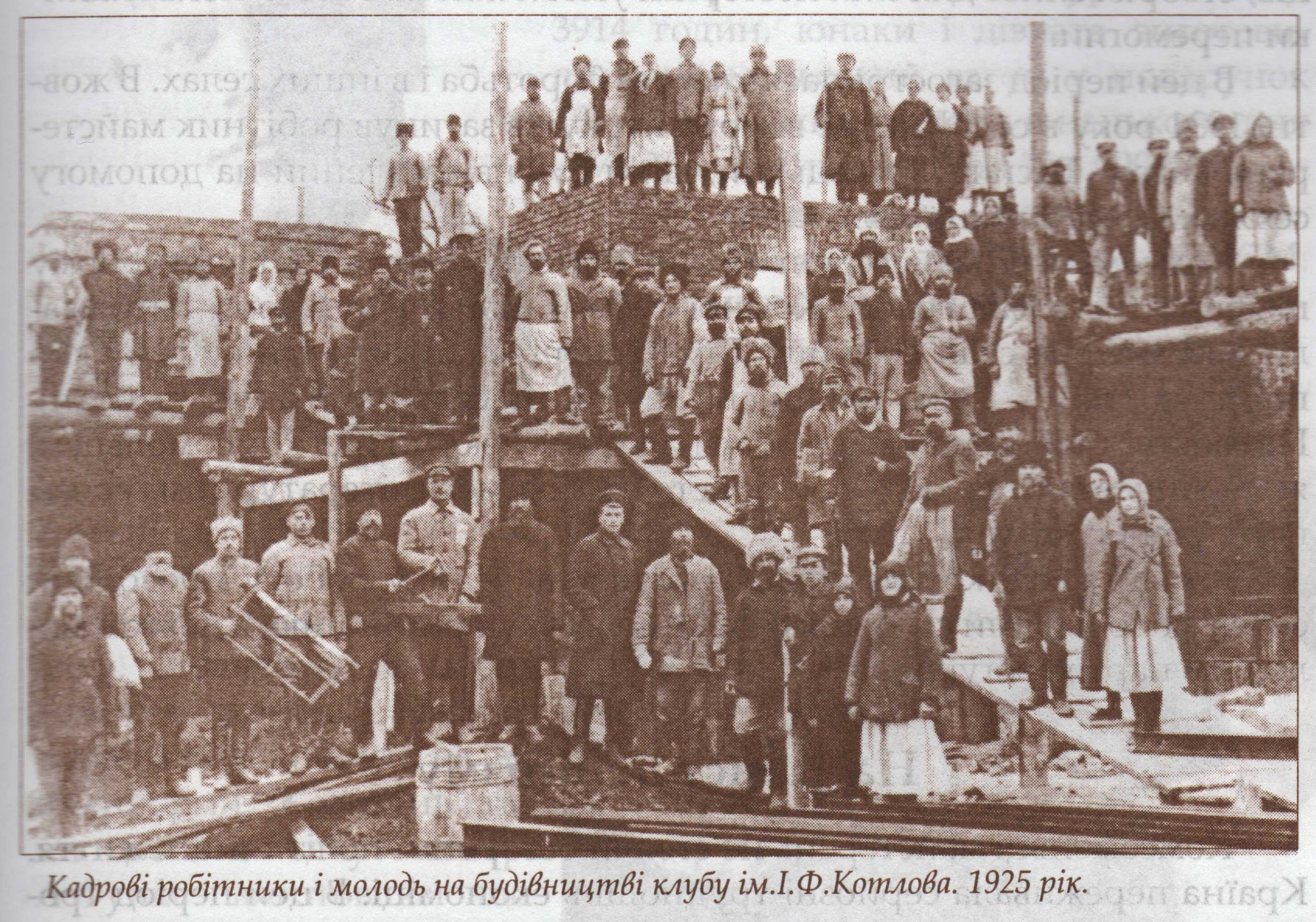
Workers and youth at a club, 1925.

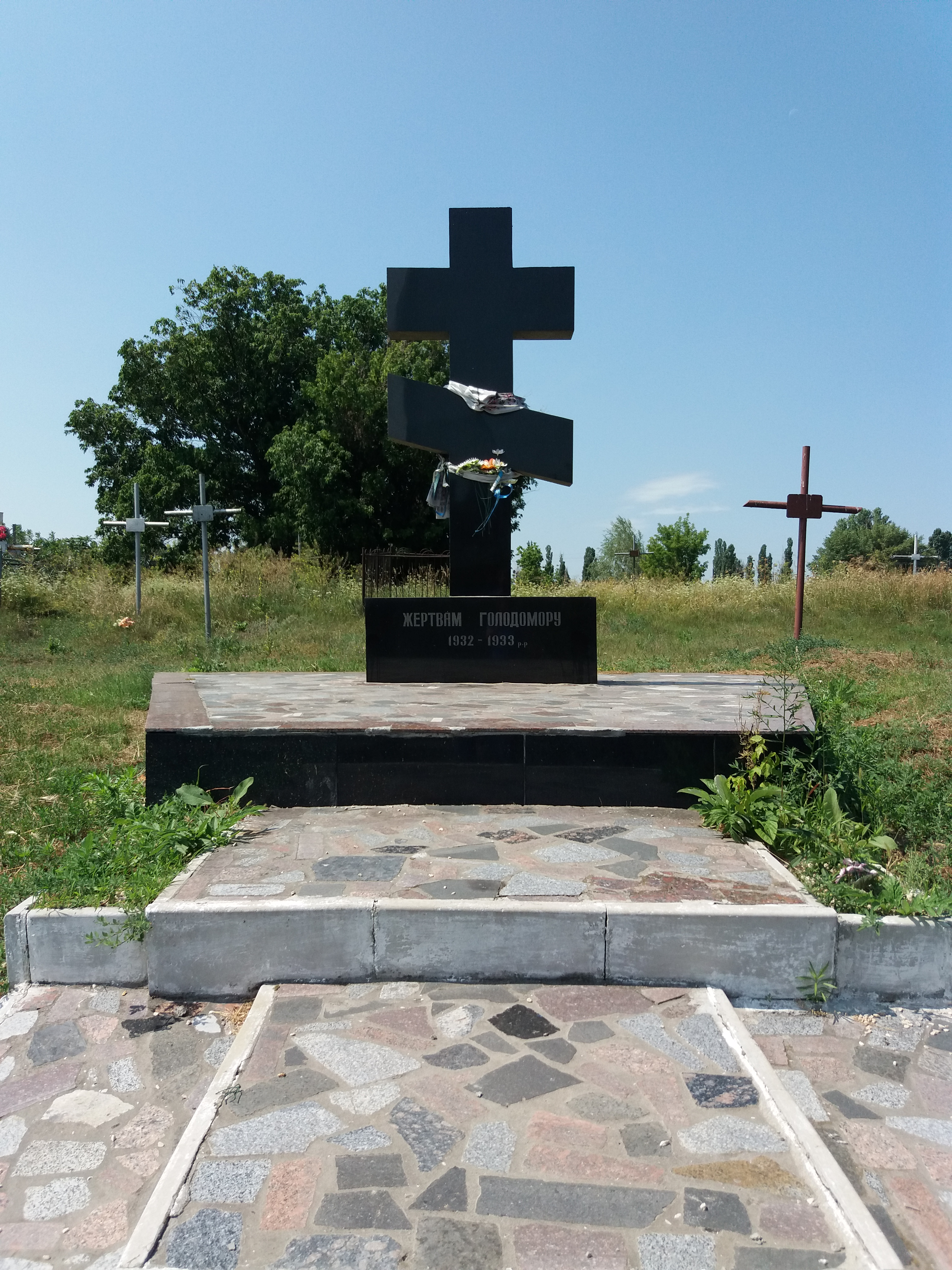
Memorial sign to victims of the Holodomor.

After the Bolsheviks retook Kremenchug for the last time during the war, the city's revkom was disbanded, a new presidium was formed, while work was done on quarantining and food requisition. Nationalisation began in May 1920, while the so-called "bourgeoisie" were evicted to Kriukiv. In August 1920, due to the surrounding region's instability, Kremenchuk was elevated to the capital of the new Kremenchuk Governorate. In 1922, the Ukrainian SSR was annexed into the newly-formed Soviet Union. In 1923, it was demoted back down to being just the centre of the Kremenchuk okruha of the Poltava Governorate, before okruhas were abolished in 1930 and it then was subordinated to Kharkiv Oblast and then Poltava Oblast, becoming the centre of the Kremenchuk Raion againn in 1939.

Initially, during the 1920s, Jewish life recovered, with many families enrolling their children in Hebrew and Yiddish language schools. The "Gezkult" society was also formed to support Yiddish literature and drama, while Yiddish-language newspapers began to operate in the city. However, under Joseph Stalin, who began implementing some antisemitic policies, Ukrainisation and Russification began while Jewish societies were shut down. Also, under Stalin, many Germans faced repression in the city, such as Pavlo Kohal, who was executed as a spy despite it later being known that the testimonies against him were false.

In May 1931, another huge flood of the Dnipro started, with water filling in the streets even in the highest buildings, submerging entire districts and buildings. Both the dam upstream and at Kryukiv failed, with a flood headquarters subsequently being established in Pishchana Hora and rescue crews arriving from other cities. In total, 21 million rubles of damage was done to Kremeenchug during the flood, alongside 1,450 buildings being totally destroyed and 3,350 partially. This would eventually lead the 1937 development plan to attempt to have flood protection zones. During the Holodomor in 1932-33, Kremenchug was less affected than the countryside, though at the same time long queues for food began. Kremenchug actually had a population surge as families in the countryside started bringing their children to Kremenchug, with a witness called Ivan Romancha saying many were starving and died before proper care could be given. Many orphanages and children's homes had to turn away children. During the Great Purge, around 2,000 people in Kremenchug were repressed, with many of the city's council being executed. Regardless, by 1939, just before the war, Kremenchug had 22 schools and 8 technical schools, 15 clubs, a cinema, 39 libraries, a theatre, and a healthcare network. A notable building built during this period was a workers' club that now serves as a Palace of Culture, which was completed in 1927.

=== World War II ===
Soon after the start of Operation Barbarossa, on 9 July 1941, the railway bridge linking Kremenchug to Kryukiv was destroyed by a Nazi German aircraft, which greatly hindered evacuation efforts. Despite this, the evacuation of enterprises soon after begun, while near the end of July a people's militia was formed that was subordinate Kharkov Military District, which had 3,000 recruits. Other battalions were merged to also separately form divisions, although all these militias were poorly equipped with only light ammunition and shotguns.

==== Battle of Kremenchug ====
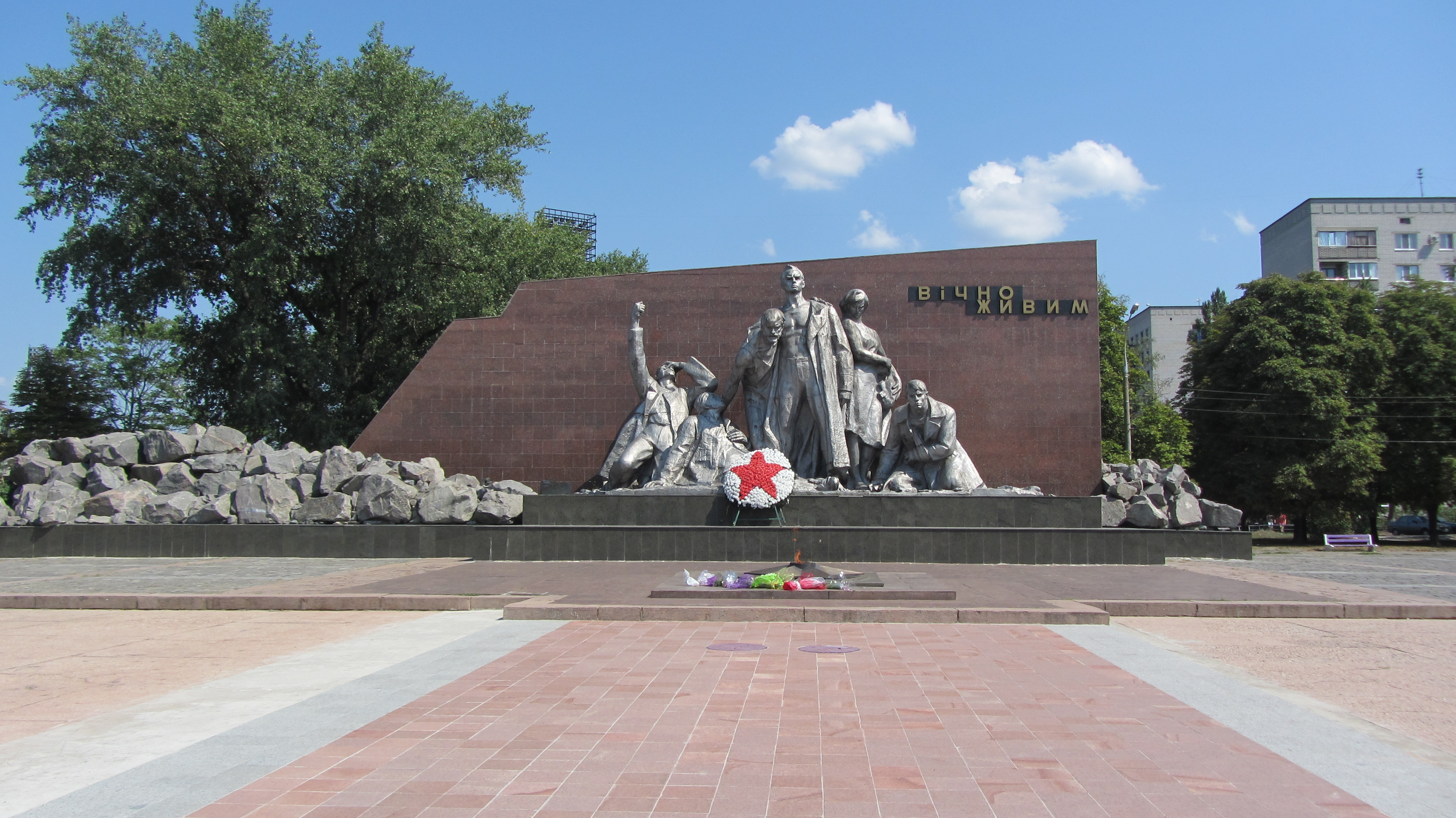
Memorial "Forever Alive", which commemorates the 97,000 people killed in Kremenchug during the occupation.

A German tank group first reached the area of Kremenchug on 6 August, coming in from the villages of Andrusivka and Onufriivka. Due to this, and to try and reinforce the sector consisting of the city and Hradyzk and Kyshenky, the Southwestern Front's 297th Rifle Division was brought in from Dubno. Fighting for Kremenchug then begun on the right bank on 8-9 August, pitting the 297th Division and the militia against the 13th Panzer Division. However, the Soviets severely miscalculated, leading to extensive losses that night (2/3 of the militia died) due to virtually no combat readiness, and so the Soviets withdrew the units across the river and abandoned Kryukiv which fell on 9 August to the Germans. Nevertheless, the fighting was helpful in allowing more time to organise a defense for the city. After the 13th took Kryukiv, the Germans began shelling Kremenchug, with the city being heavily underprepared as the regional committee could not carry out its assignments to evacuate the stuck Kremenchug industry. In fact, in the panic, the city's leadership actually voluntarily destroyed the enterprises via demolition before fleeing to Poltava, with tens of millions of rubles of enterprise being destroyed. With a power vacuum and no leadership in the city, Kremenchug became a centre of looting, while the Germans continued to shell the city for another month.

On 25 August, Semyon Budyonny finally issued a directive that the German advance across the Dnipro to Kremenchug needed to be stopped, and the 5th Cavalary Corps was re-stationed to be nearby alongside the 47th Tank Division. However, the Soviets again made a critical mistake by assuming in September that Paul Ludwig Ewald von Kleist would try to develop a bridgehead near Deriivka to reach Kremenchug, and so the Soviets concentrated most of their forces there. Instead, Kleist actually decided to bring his forces directly to Kremenchug, and crossed the Dnipro easily on 9 September because only a single regiment of the 297th was stationed in Kremenchug. After taking Kremenchug, Kleist's forces linked up with Heinz Guderian's near Lokhvytsia to attack Khorol, which the Soviets didn't anticipate.

==== Occupation of Kremenchug ====
After Kremenchug fell to Germany, it was initially under military rule under Army Group South as part of Feldkommandantur 239. After Reichskommissariat Ukraine was created, Kremenchug came under Generalbezirk Kiew as the seat of a gebiet known as Krementschug. During this brief time it was under military command, it was ordered that camps in Kremenchug be reconstructed immediately under Franz von Roques. During the occupation, the population of the city decreased to roughly one-third of its pre-war size. The city, in addition to having a civilian mayor, had a Ukrainian auxiliary police, which consisted of around 270-300 people. The auxiliary police were later also found guilty of assisting in rounding up Jews, guarding them, and burying them, although only one policeman ever participated in the killings. They still routinely took over apartments of Jews who were massacred.

After its start, Kremenchug was chosen as the site of a prisoner of war camp known as Stalag 346-A, which was formerly the barracks for the 12th Infantry Division, alongside another one known as Stalag 346-V on the site of a rocket brigade and battery position. Both were extensively covered in barbed wire, and together their capacity was 20,000 people, although a third, more minor camp was also opened with a capacity for 1,500, although these prisoners were mostly used for building bridges and highways. Prisoners at the Stalag camps would later say conditions were brutal, with most prisoners having little to no food and epidemics became common. This became worse when prisoners were transferred from Dulag-160 in Khorol by the 24th Infantry Division, although the transfer was also notable because during the walk to Kremenchug around 1,500 people were killed. By December 1941, the camps in Kremenchug housed 52,512 people, far above their capacity, with a very high mortality rate, which was a charge later brought against Franz von Roques at the Nuremberg Trials. In addition, the city also had a forced labour drive to deport citizens to Germany, which was promoted by local newspapers through official "tesimonies". However, unlike in other oblasts, deportation rates within the region remained relatively low. Estimates have found that around 10,000 people were deported in the city.

===== OUN =====
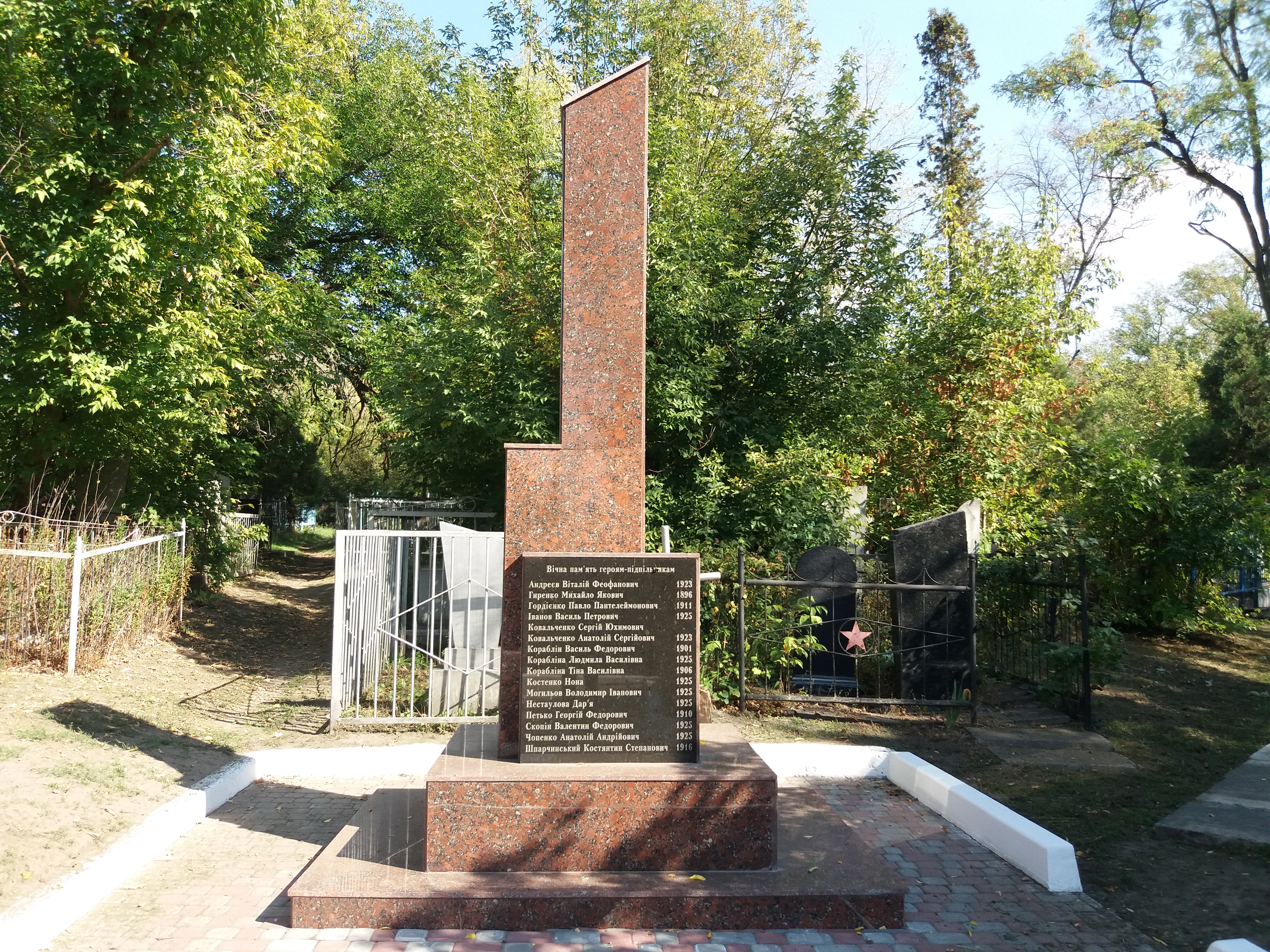
Mass grave of underground partisans

During the occupation, the city had a Ukrainian nationalist underground. In regard to the OUN, Kremenchug was a significant centre within the region because it was an important spot to head towards southern Ukraine and the Donbas, and so had at least several dozen people in its cells. Among its more notable members was Mykhailo Shchepandsky, who was editor of the Dnipro Wave, which initially printed German propaganda, criticism of earlier repressions by the Soviets such as the Holodomor, and heavily promoted the Ukrainian independence movement. The OUN was particularly active at the local history museum in 1941, showing exhibitions that also promoted a Ukrainian revival. They also organised a Prosvita society, which had over 100 members by the time the Germans and OUN started falling out, and a Ukrainian-language reading room and library. The city theatre also started running Ukrainian plays. However, the OUN cell still, at the same time in 1941, worked in ransoming prisoners of war out of the camps, mostly Ukrainians, which they did by showing the Germans forged paperwork via workers who worked in the German rear-area headquarters, although some would be killed for this.

Thus, this relationship between the Germans and the OUN did not last long, as by the winter of 1942, a SS-Sonderkommando of the Sicherheitsdienst known as Karl Julius Plath arrived in the city and ordered the Germans and the 213th Security Division to arrest Ukrainian nationalists. They first began by seizing OUN carriers, and then captured participants and shot them. They soon after arrested the museum staff and Ukrainian-language interpreters, although leaflets calling for Ukrainian independence and denouncing the Germans also appeared throughout the rest of the German occupation.

===== Partisan underground =====
In addition to the OUN underground, Kremenchug had a Soviet partisan underground. The first attempts to make one were made in the autumn of 1941, but these attempts failed after the NKVD accidentally revealed its spies, forcing them to flee. Eventually, six underground cells were formed, and together they planned operations, helped evacuate prisoners of war through the "Black Forest", and dropped leaflets. The largest network was in Hospital No. 1 under V.K. Konstantynovych, who sheltered around 2,000 people from captivity. Found cells consisted of: a Red Army group under Romashkin and Lisneko, who extracted prisoners of war, but they were killed in December 1942, a cell at the wagon-building plant that sabotaged German equipment and helped evading soldiers, but they were killed in March 1943, and a Komsomol network formed in the summer of 1942 which copied bulletins and produced leaflets but were also caught but some escaped. Cells that weren't caught included: Squad 303, which was formed in late 1942 and had around 200 members and did agitation via leaflets and bulletins, the group of Zinaida Itskevych which distributed leaflets and supplied forged documents, Patriots of the Motherland who operate in camp A starting in December 1941, the "Lieutenant Dniprov" group which had 60 members and sabotaged equipment while later joining Nabat, and Nabat which was formed in February 1942 and worked as an agitation network tied to Prosvita.

===== Holocaust =====
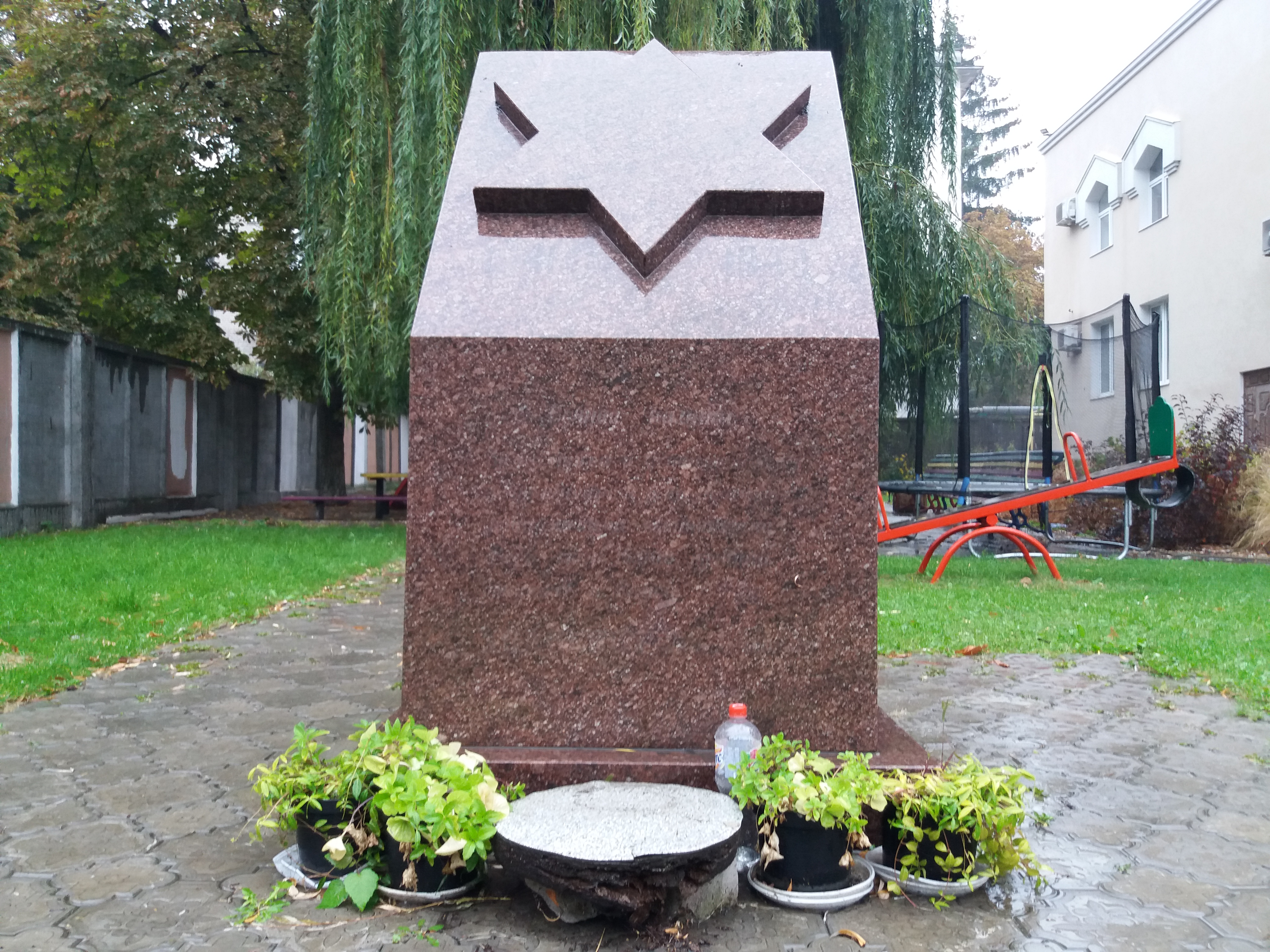
Memorial to victims of the Holocaust.

At the start of the German occupation, Kremenchug had a high number of Jews, who made up 22% of the population of the city in 1939. Most Jews were able to evacuate prior to the German occupation, although around 7,000 remained by the time the city was taken. After the Germans arrived, they robbed identified Jews and began conscripting them for labour while requiring them to wear Yellow badges and have a specific curfew. Sometime in early September, within days of the Germans arriving, the Einsatzkommando 4b entered the city, and they almost instantly began killing Jews on 13 September, shooting 125 during this stage. By September, only around 3,500 Jews plus 100 identified as mixed families were still recorded in the city, and those not killed during early September were brought into barracks on the outskirts of the city as a ghetto and left while being forced to surrender all valuables. 700 more Jews were captured and brought to the barracks over the following weeks. Testimonies by Jewish survivors described the conditions as very overcrowded, while historian Dieter Pohl later said it was because the ghetto was never meant to be long-term and was simply a preparatory area for the subsequent massacres.

In late October, representatives of the Higher SS and police, led by Herbert Degenhardt, arrived to help begin the massacres of Jews and start the Holocaust in the city. The first killings began on 28 October 1941 at Peshchana Hill, and would continue there until January 1942, with the largest single massacre being on 1 November when 3,000 Jews died. An additional 500 Jews would die between November and January, with 124 being on 7 November, 148 on 8 November, 103 on 15 November, and then other instances. Also, around 1,500 people accused of being Jewish at the Stalag 346 camp were similarly massacred after being forced into pits in groups of hundreds, and 21 other doctors were killed at the camp, also after being stripped and forced into latrines. Not every Jew was killed instantly, as some deemed more "useful" were initially kept, but then later killed, especially after medical personnel were not exempt from being killed. However, local townspeople during this time did try to help, such as the city mayor who issued orders to baptise Jews, with church officials issuing them documents, although this was discovered and the mayor was executed. Another effort was the group "Patriot of the Motherland", which among its actions concealed Jewish people's identities in Stalag camps, also providing false testimonies and documents. They were joined by another underground cell which helped with forging documents and sheltering Jews.

A rough estimate done in 2007 found that, at least according to the Nuremberg trials, around 60,000 people were killed in the city during the occupation, of which 50,000 were prisoners of war, 8,000 were Jewish, and 20,000 were other civilians. Other estimates done by the Soviets put the number at 97,000.

==== Liberation of Kremenchug ====
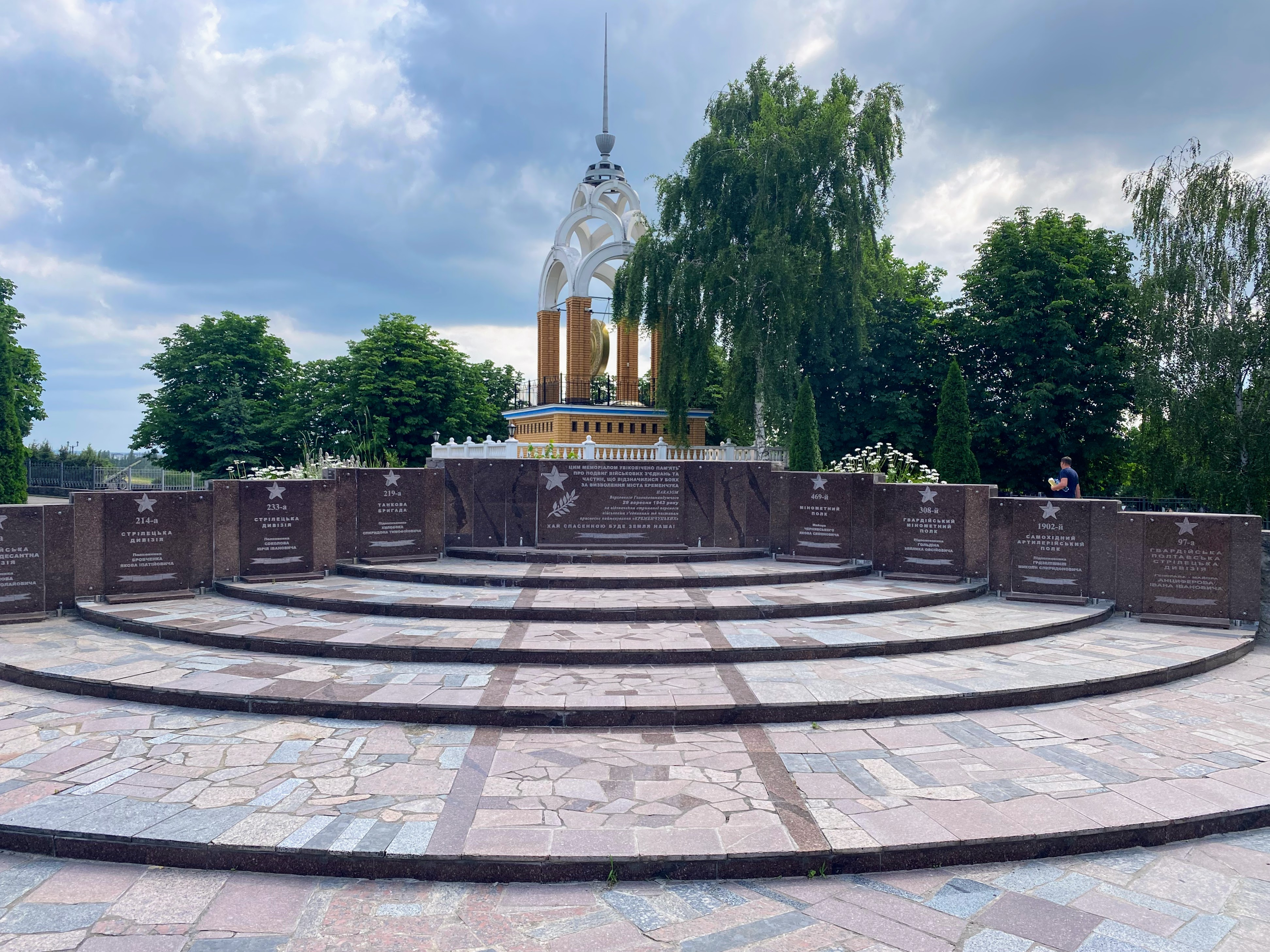
Memorial to those who liberated Kremenchug.

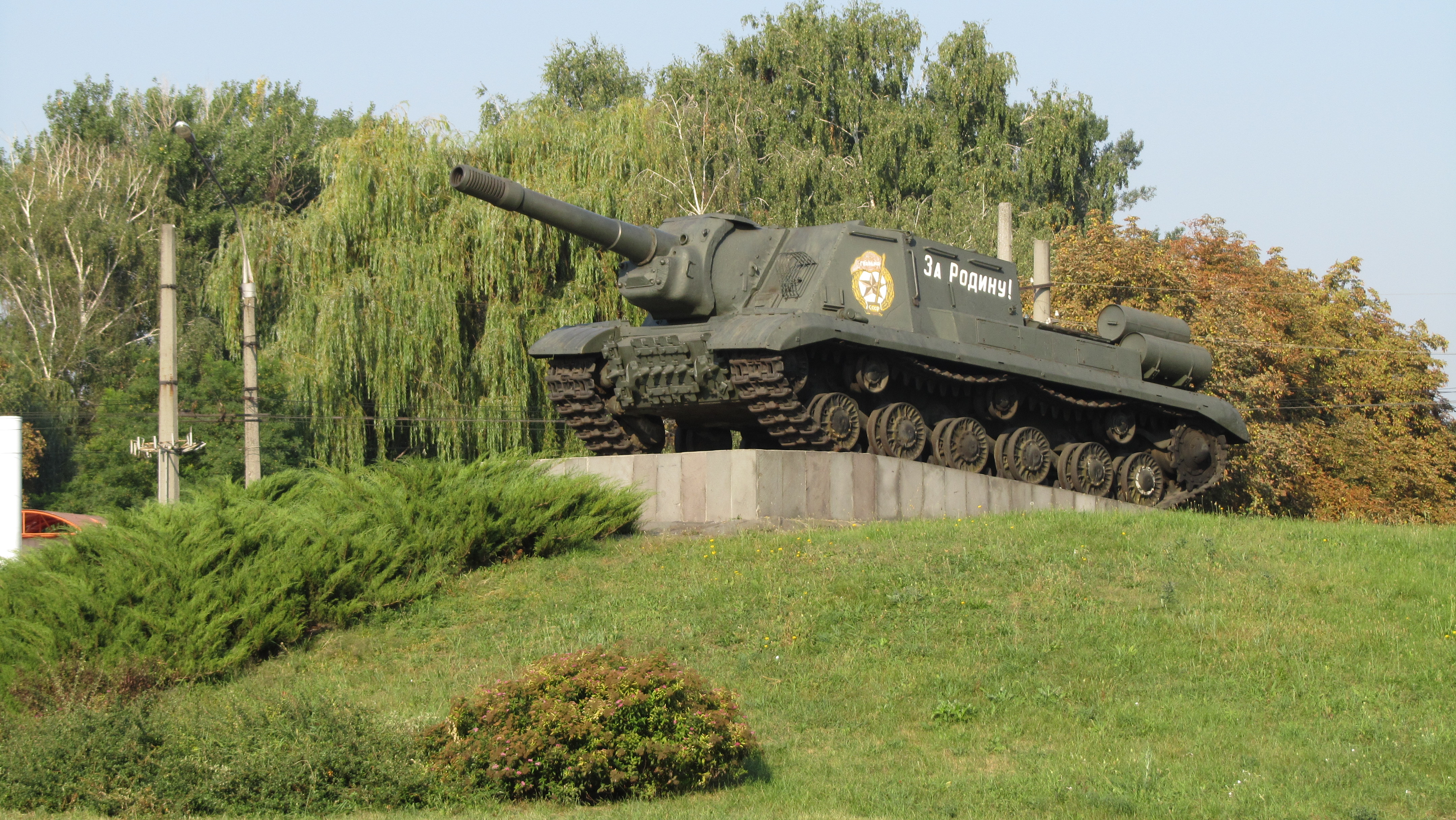
A monument of an SU-152 in honour of the liberation

In preparation for the Battle of the Dnieper, in September 1943 the Voronezh Front and the Steppe Front was ordered to reach the Dnieper, although the Steppe Front was later the only one who took part, while the Soviet Air Forces began targeting bridges in Kremenchug used by the Germans. The most significant bombing prior to the battle starting was on 23 September, when members of the 293rd Bomber Aviation Division using Petlyakov Pe-2 that carried FAB bombs were ordered to destroyed the motor-transport bridge at Kremenchug used by the retreating Germans. The 312th Night Bomber Aviation Division then subsequently started bombing German vehicles at the crossings leading up to the battle. With the start of the Battle of the Dnieper as part of the Poltava-Kremenchug Offensive on 27 September, the 1st Mechanized Corps alongside the 33rd Guards Rifle Division were ordered to capture Kremenchug. At the time, the city was heavily defended with infantry and elite SS divisions, and the Germans had already built bunkers and minefields near Kremenchug. The 14th Guards Airborne Division was the first to assault Kremenchug via the hamlet of Sominleky, which was defended by the German line "M-2". The hamlet fell that night to the Soviets, who then moved into the village of Savyne, or the Molodizhnyi settlement, with fighting there on the line known as "R" continuing into 28 September. That same night, the Germans began their withdrawal to Krasnoznamianka, but were stopped by members of the 17th Guards Airborne Regiment who flanked their position and took the village of Peschanoye.

The 305th Rifle Division entered Kremenchug proper later that day, which is the day that the city is traditionally considered liberated, although fighting continued until 30 September at the northern outskirts of the city when the 17th Guards Airborne Regiment officially waved the Soviet flag through the city park. The capture of Kremenchug allowed Soviet troops to cross into the right bank. In total, seven units of the Red Army were awarded the honourific title of Kremenchug for the liberation of the city: the 6th Guards Airborne Division, 214th Rifle Division, 233rd Rifle Division, 219th Tank Brigade, 469th Mortar Regiment, 308th Guards Mortar Regiment, and the 1902nd Self-Propelled Artillery Regiment. The 97th Guards Mechanized Brigade separately were recommended for the title of Order of the Red Banner, although they were not given the honourific of Kremenchug.

=== Postwar ===
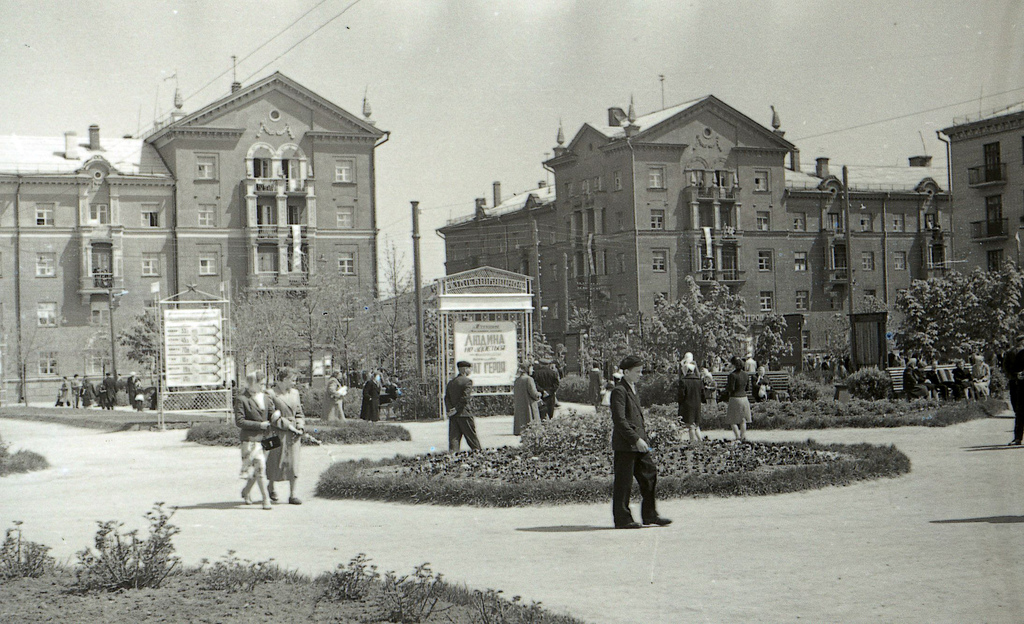
City centre of Kremenchuk in the 1960s.

Satellite view of Kremenchug in 1983.

In the immediate aftermath of the war, Kremenchug was devastated, with its housing only at around 10-15% of its prewar level. The first thing reconstructed was the railway junction, for which 1,500 people were brought in to repair. Another important problem right after liberation was bridges connecting Kryukiv and Kremenchug, as the Germans had blown every crossing up. Around 3,000 residents were brought in to construct a new, temporary wooden bridge, with traffic first opening up in either January or May 1944.

Soon after, in August 1945, Glavmoststroi chose the city to be the site of three new enterprises: a metal structures plant, a rolling base, and a mechanical plant. The first brick for the bridge plant's foundation was laid in 1946, which is the same year that another permanent two-tier bridge started to be built across the Dnipro, which had a vertical-lift span, with the lower deck being for rail traffic and the upper deck being for cars. Two years later, the bridge plant finally opened, and then in 1949 the two-tier bridge was also opened, which would become known as Kryukiv Bridge. In 1952, the metal structures and mechanical plants were merged to make the Kremenchug Bridge Plant, although soon after, it suffered due to bridge reconstruction from the war being declared complete and had to pivot to other products. Nearby, in May 1954, the Kremenchuk Hydroelectric Power Plant started to be built just upstream at Svitlovodsk, which also had a great impact, as many populated places were relocated during the construction.

Four years later, in 1958, the now suffering bridge plant which had become a combine-harvester plant was reconstructed to make heavy diesel trucks, and from then on became known as "Dnipro-222" then KrAZ, which became a very important enterprise to the city almost immediately. During this heightened era of industrialisation in Kremenchug, the Kremenchuk Oil Refinery was also opened in 1961 alongside a wheel plant (KrKZ), which was separated off from KrAZ, and a new steel plant. To meet the needs of this rapid industrialisation, housing was also rapidly built in blocks and a new thermal power plant was opened. A trolleybus system was also opened in 1966, first running along a route from River Port to the Power Station, which was subsequently expanded throughout the 1960s and into the 70s. Another notable opening during this time on the cultural side of things was the new Palace of Culture on Pushkina Boulevard alongside the later Naftokhimik Palace of Culture, which opened up in 1979.

== In an independent Ukraine ==
=== 1990s to early 2010s ===
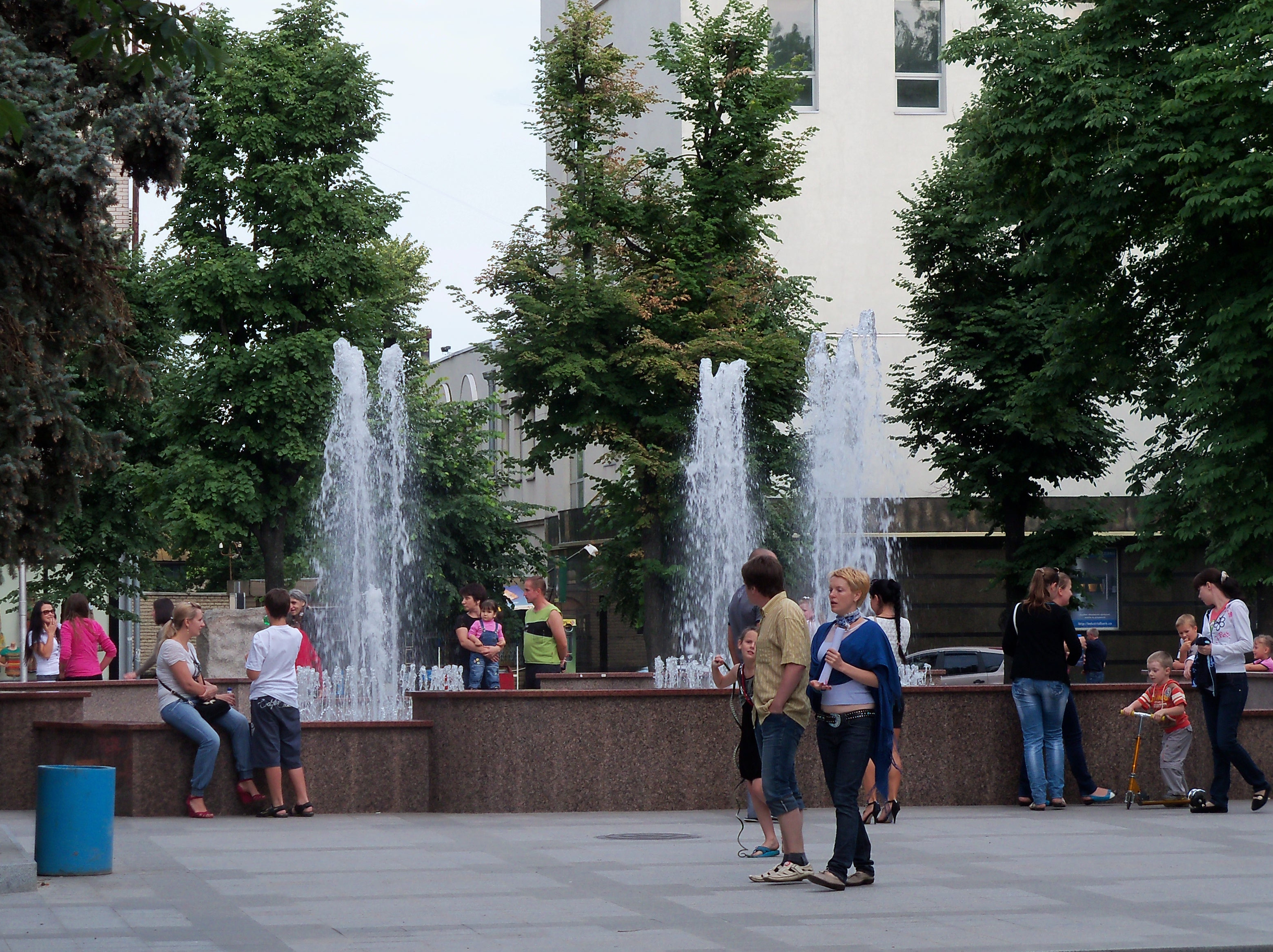
Fountain at the city centre of Kremenchuk, 2012.

After Ukrainian independence, most of the enterprises in the city were privatised. Shortly thereafter, in 1995, the Kremenchuk Automobile Assembly Plant was opened up, which in 2000 became a division of the Avtoinvestbud enterprise. Meanwhile, the oil refinery in the city went through instability due to a series of rapid ownership changes from the end of the 1990s to the 2000s, although it still underwent modernisation efforts between 2006 and 2009. Eventually, at least by 2004, the enterprise would come under Russian interest control as part of TNK-BP, headed by oligarch Mikhail Fridman. On the social side of things, in April 2003, the local newspaper in the city Informbiuleten would be singled out by the Prosecutor General's Office of Ukraine over allegations that it attempted to undermine Leonid Kuchma due to running materials about the Cassette Scandal and the murder of journalist Georgiy Gongadze. Ukrzaliznytsia during this time also introduced accelerated train routes for Kyiv to Kremenchuk to help connect cities to the capital faster.

During early 2010, Kremenchuk received a multi-million-hryvnia grant from Germany for energy-saving projects for the utilities of the city. That same year, Kremenchuk Mykhailo Ostrohradskyi National University, by decree no. 683/2010, the university received the status of a "national university" for its contributions to national education. Starting in 2012, with the closure of the Lysychansk Oil Refinery in Luhansk Oblast, the oil refinery at Kremenchuk took on far greater importance as the only operating oil refinery in all of Ukraine. Also during this time, with new investments, the trolleybus system greatly improved with new routes and new trolleybuses entering into service quickly.

=== Euromaidan and unrest ===
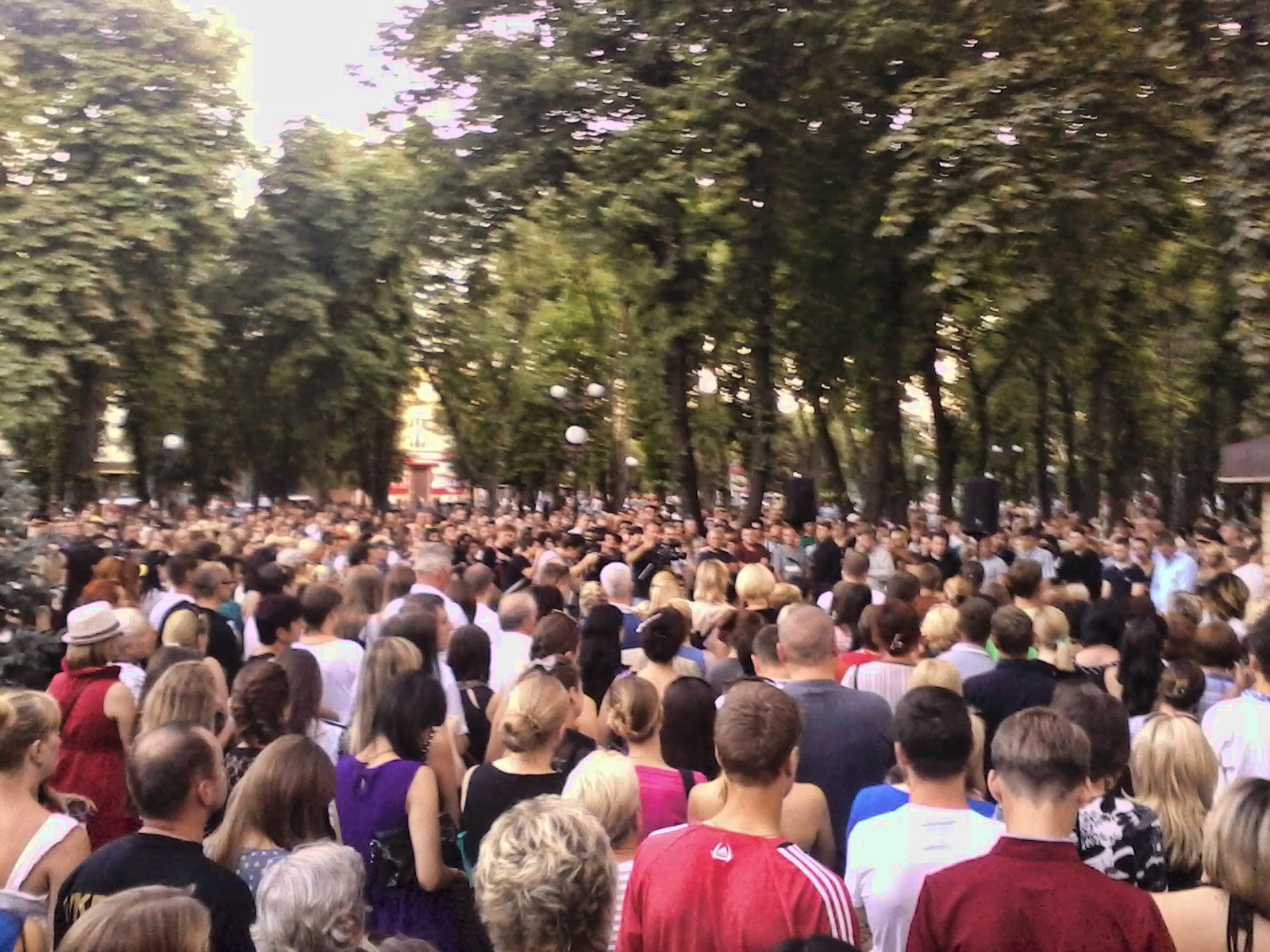
Requiem in honour of assassinated mayor Oleh Babaiev, 2014.

Euromaidan protests in the city first began shortly after its start in November, which was met with a ban on public assemblies at Independence and Victory Square. However, rallies were still held throughout November regardless of the ongoing ban in solidarity with the protesters in Kyiv, with activists pelting and destroying branches of Russian banks like Sberbank with police not intervening. There were also some Anti-Maidan protests in the city led by the Party of Regions. On 18 January 2014, during the city hall's meeting, some citizens of Kremenchuk demanded that a no confidence vote be done on the government of Viktor Yanukovych and for there to be a refusal of the recognition of the laws passed by his government on 16 January. During the following extraordinary meeting held on 27 January, mayor Oleh Babaiev urged for calmness and not to storm any administrative buildings, although the city council did adopt the measures advocated by the citizens of calling for the recognition of Yanukovych and to repeal the laws and the rest of the government. This came after at least two citizens of Kremenchuk, Ihor Serdyuk and Ivan Kreman, were killed during the central protests in Kyiv as part of the Heavenly Hundred. On 24 February 2014, two monuments to Vladimir Lenin were dismantled, with the ceremonies being attended by thousands of residents.

The tension due to Euromaidan reached a height on 26 July 2014 when the mayor of Kremenchuk, Oleh Babaiev, was assassinated near his home. Babaiev was formerly a member of the pro-European Batkivshchyna, although he left after taking office, and was known to support Euromaidan activists. According to investigations, Babaiev had stopped his car outside his house when a Lada pulled up and fired shots into his car, killing him instantly. The investigation into the identities of the assassin and the motives for the killing stalled for some time, with the first theory being that he was killed on the orders of the "Vizit" company after Babaiev tried to transfer control through the courts.

=== Recovery ===
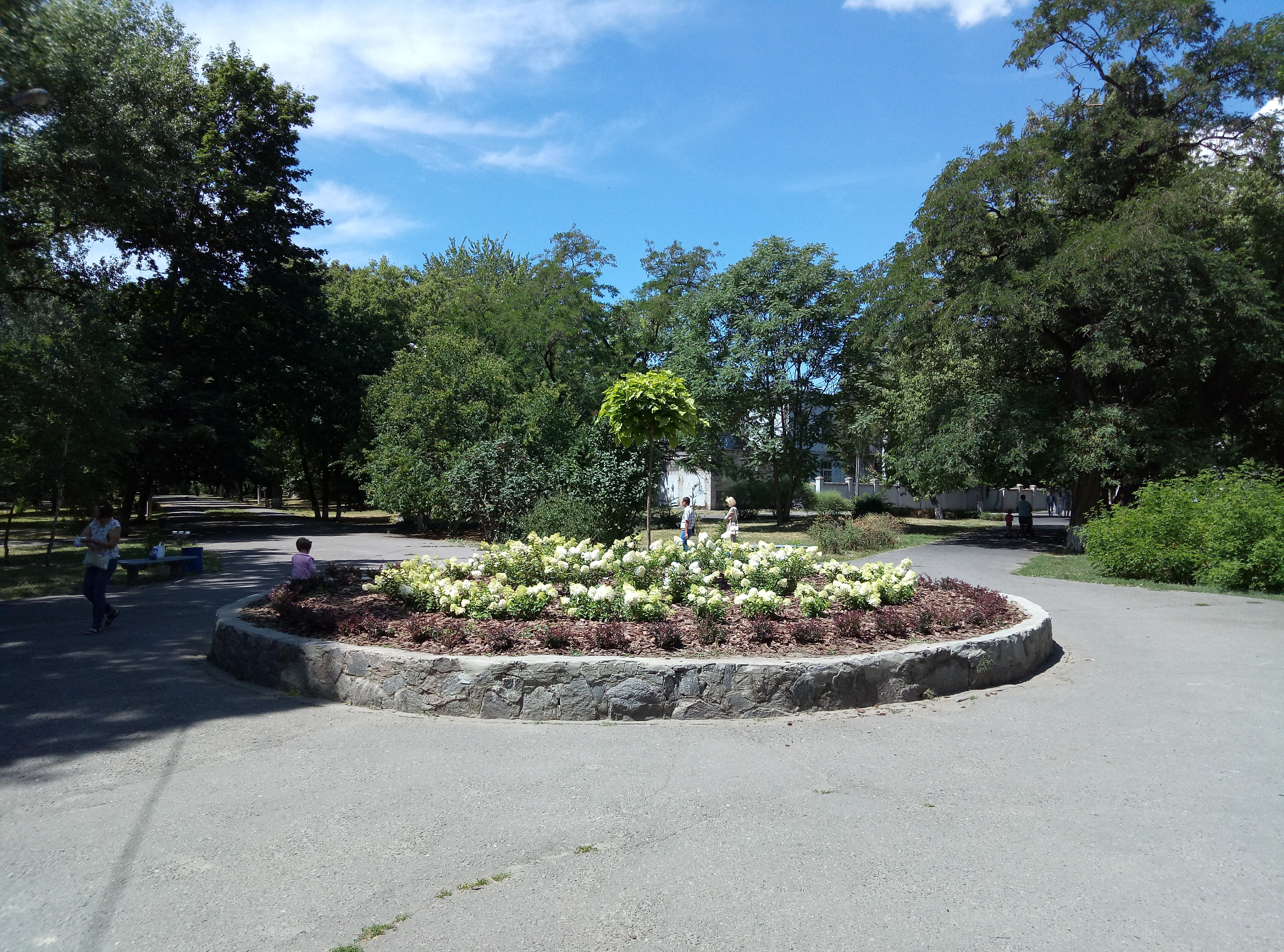
City Garden in 2017

During the summer of 2015, after the oil refinery became owned by Ukrtatnafta, there were problems with the national operator Ukrtransnafta. In July, Ukrtransnafta stopped oil supplies to all Ukrtatnafta plants due to a defect in the pipeline to Kremenchuk, which would have led to the shutdown of the oil refinery. Due to this, in August 2015, individuals blockaded the Kremenchuk branch of Ukrtransnafta, saying they wouldn't let the refinery shut down. Around 50 to 150 security personnel from Ukrtatnafta also arrived to blockade the plant from Ukrtransnafta. At the end of August, Naftogaz said they had found 200 firearms belonging to the group at the refinery, and that the director of the refinery was trying to obstruct disarmament. After the standoff ended, in February 2016, a new patrol police force began service in the city.

As part of decommunisation efforts, on 18 February 2016, the then mayor, Vitaliy Maletskyi, signed an order that renamed 114 streets in Kremenchuk. Among the most notable changes was Zhuvtneva Street being renamed after Ihor Serdyuk, who was part of the Heavenly Hundred who were killed during Euromaidan. By this point, KrAZ, as part of the rearmament effort during the ATO in the War in the Donbas, became a major private subcontractor in defense. KrAZ, for example, in 2017 produced government contracts worth 2 billion hryvnias that year for 500 heavy armoured vehicles, which was a fifth of the entire state defense contract. This led to rampant speculation surrounding the relationship between KrAZ's owner and government officials. However, at the same time despite the contracts KrAZ had, the actual employment numbers in the city were low, which had led to many residents in Kremenchuk going to other cities and abroad for work or filing for unemployment.

On 17 July 2020, as part of administrative reforms under Volodymyr Zelenskyy, the Verkhovna Rada passed a law by which Kremenchuk lost its designation as a city of regional significance (the system was abolished nationwide), which meant the city was incorporated into the newly-formed Kremenchuk Raion as its administrative centre alongside also being the administrative centre of the Kremenchuk urban hromada. That same year, as part of the COVID-19 pandemic in Ukraine, Kremenchuk was placed into an orange zone as part of the epidemic's classification.

=== Russian invasion of Ukraine ===
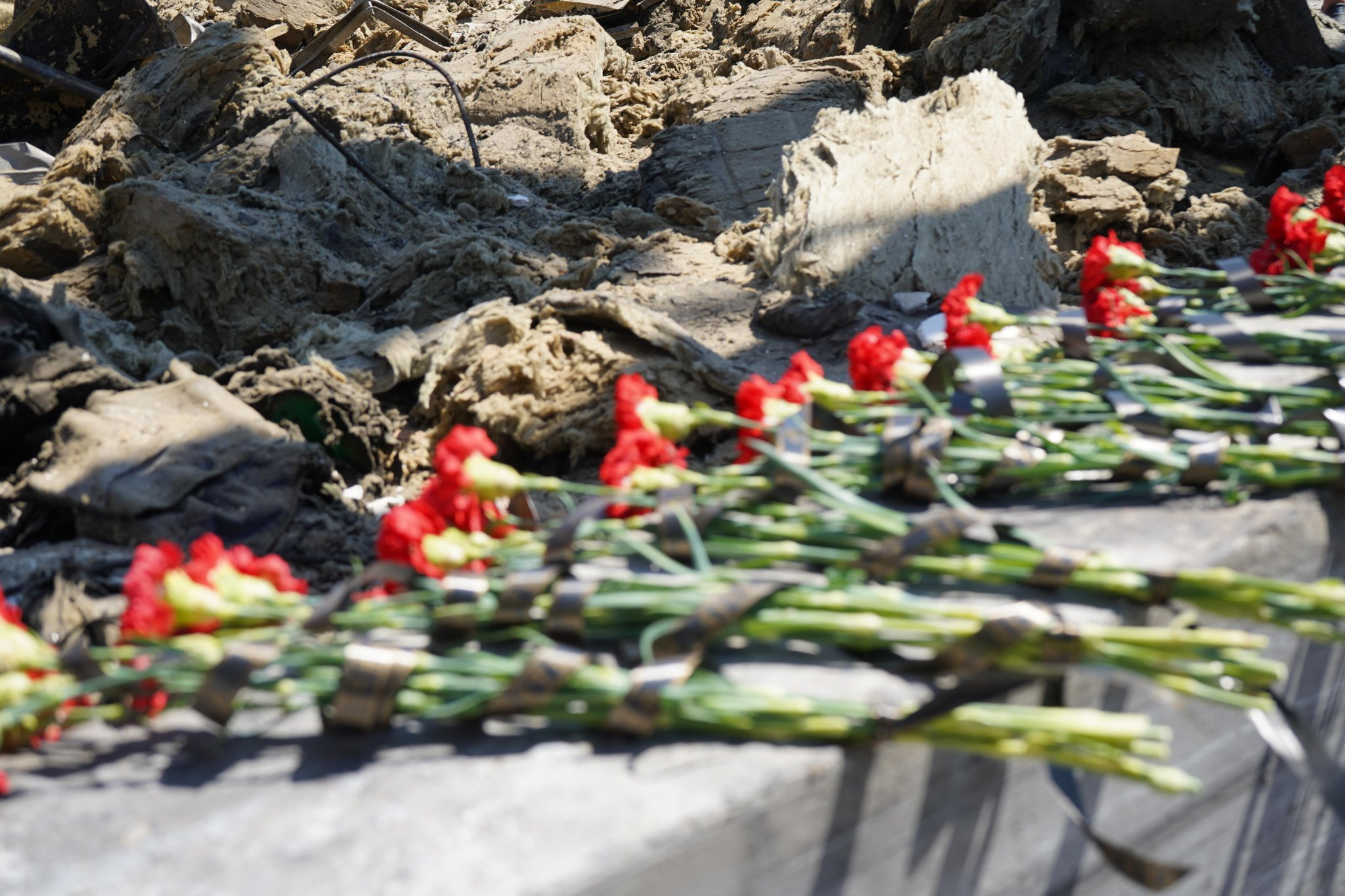
Flowers left at the memorial for the victims of the June 2022 mall attack by Russian forces.

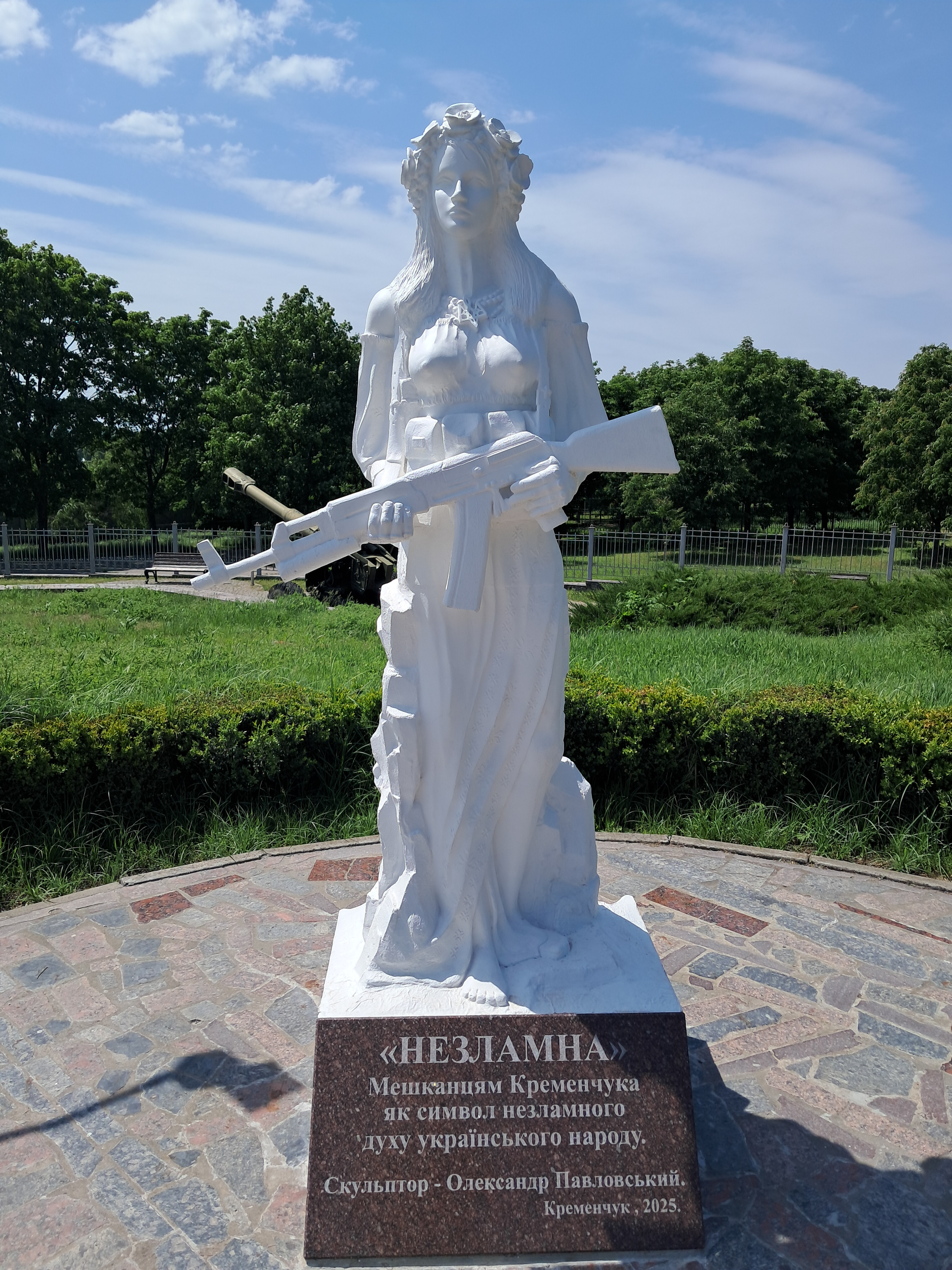
Statue "Unbreakable", constructed in 2025 in honour of the spirit of the Ukrainian people.

Shortly after the start of the Russian invasion of Ukraine, many Internally displaced person from the frontlines began evacuating to Kremenchuk, with a humanitarian headquarters being established in the city to deal with this, alongside a university dormitory being converted to a shelter for those displaced. In April 2022, the city's oil refinery, by then the only remaining oil refinery in Ukraine, was struck by a Russian aircraft, with Dmytro Lunin saying shortly afterwards that the refinery was destroyed. Despite this, the refinery was struck again throughout the following months many times. That same month of April, it was recorded that around 15,106 internationally displaced persons due to the war were registered in the city of Kremenchuk, which led to the city to appeal for donations. Shortly after this, on 27 June 2022, the deadliest attack in the city in the course of the war happened when Russian forces struck the Amstor shopping mall with Kh-22 cruise missiles. At the time of the attack, around 1,000 civilians were inside the mall. After the missiles struck the building, a large fire engulfed the building, leading to the mall's roof collapsing entirely. By 28 June, the State Emergency Service reported 16 people were dead and 59 were injured, with the death toll rising over the days as more recovery efforts took place to 22 people dead and 59 injured.

After the attack, the Ministry of Defense of Russia said that the forces had primarily targeted hangars that had ammunition, and that other detonations had struck the mall which was "non-operational", which was refuted by witness accounts from the BBC and photographs showing the mall was operational and that the hangar and the mall were not close enough for the mall to be hit by accident. The attack drew international condemnation, with Andriy Yermak calling Russia a "state sponsor of terrorism" while the European Union under Josep Borrell strongly condemned the strike. Despite the attack, the number of IDPs in the subsequent months continued to rise to 46,289 in the entire raion by September, which the city attempted to accommodate, while the city started to rename streets after Ukrainian soldiers who were killed in the war. Subsequent strikes on Kremenchuk increased in late 2025, with an August 2025 strike knocking out power and leaving unexploded cluster munitions. Kremenchuk was once again struck in December 2025, which causing power and water outages in the city again. By early 2026, Kremenchuk was hosting 31,000 IDPs of its population of 210,000 at the time, although the city has also been supported through humanitarian donations from the EU, UNDP, and UNFPA.

== Sources ==
- Suprunenko, O. B. (2004). Старожитності Кременчука: Археологічні пам'ятки території та округи міста (in Ukrainian). Kremenchuk: Археологія.
- Вирський, Дмитро (2019). Новоросія Incognita: Кременчук 1764–1796 рр. (матеріали з історії регіональної столиці) (in Ukrainian). Kyiv: Поліграфічна дільниця Інституту історії України НАН України.
- Вирський, Дмитро (2003). КРЕМЕНЧУК 1917-1920 рр.: ПРОВІНЦІЙНІ ОБРАЗИ РЕВОЛЮЦІЇ (in Ukrainian). Kyiv: НАЦІОНАЛЬНА АКАДЕМІЯ НАУК УКРАЇНИ ІНСТИТУТ ІСТОРІЇ УКРАЇНИ.
- Ревегук, Віктор (2016). Полтавщина в перший рік Української революції. Доба Центральної Ради (березень 1917 – квітень 1918 рр.). Полтавський літератор.
- Adams, Arthur E. (1963). Bolsheviks in the Ukraine: The Second Campaign, 1918-1919. Yale University Press.
