= Prilukskoye oil field =

Oil field in Donetsk Oblast, Ukraine

Prilukskoye
- Country: Ukraine
- Region: Chernihiv Oblast
- Offshore/onshore: onshore
- Operator: Ukrnafta

Field history
- Discovery: 1959
- Start of development: 1959
- Start of production: 1960

Production
- Estimated oil in place: 82 million tonnes (~ 100×10^{6} m^{3} or 600 million bbl)

The Prilukskoye oil field is a Ukrainian oil field that was discovered in 1959. It began production in 1960 and produces oil. The total proven reserves of the Prilukskoye oil field are around 600 million barrels (82 million tonnes), and production is centered around 20,000 barrels per day (3,200 m^{3}/d). This makes it the largest known oil field in its region.

== History ==
In 1951, a gravity survey identified a gravitational minimum in the area. Further surveys of electrical work that were carried out in the years 1953 to 1954 delineated a subsurface uplift. In 1955-56, surveys mapped a brachyanticline. The structure was furthermore confirmed by exploratory drilling from the years 1958 to 1960, and search drilling began in 1959 with the very first well, Well No. 1. The first commercial oil was obtained from Well No. 4 in 1960 from an Upper Visean deposit. That year, the field was entered into the State Register. There was still exploration to map the surface until 1963, when it was fully opened to commercial drilling.

Starting in 1961, the development of the field began more rapidly. Productive horizons that started extraction included Horizon V-16n in 1966, V-16v in 1967, and S-8-9 and V-13 in 1977. As of January 2022, the field remains in active production, although the amount of oil that was already produced was 96.56% in January 2018.
