= Kremenchuk Oil Refinery =

Oil refinery in Ukraine

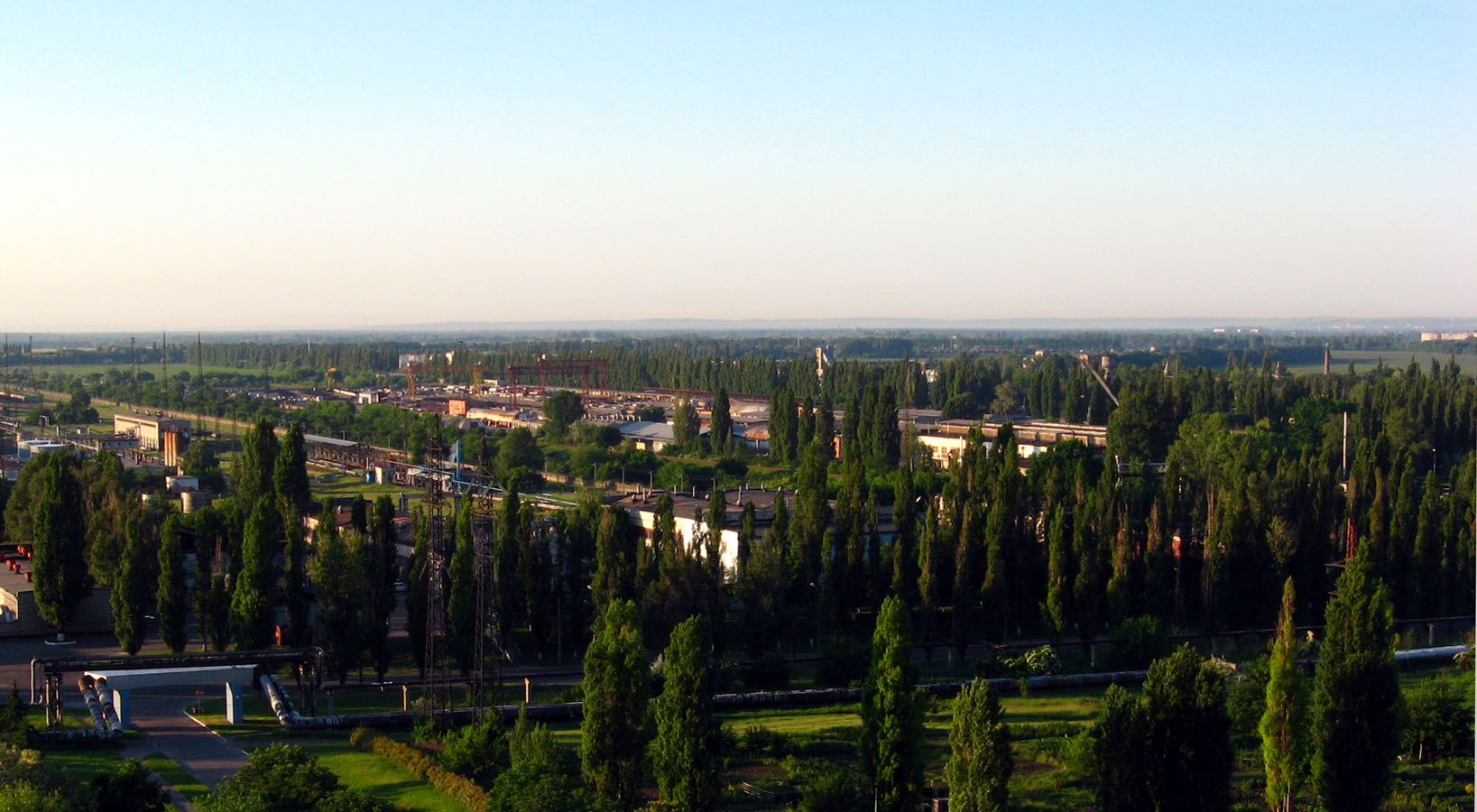
- Native name: Кременчуцький нафтопереробний завод
- Type: Business
- Industry: Oil Refinery
- Founded: 1966
- Headquarters: Svishtovska street, 3, Kremenchuk, Poltava Oblast, Ukraine
- Owner: Ukrtatnafta
- Number of employees: more than 4,300

Kremenchuk Oil Refinery is the largest oil refinery in Ukraine. It is located in Kremenchuk, Poltava Oblast. Since 1994 it has been the main branch of PJSC Ukrtatnafta.

The plant was commissioned in 1961. By 2008, the plant was supplying approximately 30% of Ukraine's petroleum market, with a design capacity for processing being 18.62 million tonnes per year, the largest in Ukraine. However, its actual production fell short of this, and in 2012 it only processed 3.091 million tonnes of oil with an employment figure of approximately 3,000 people as of September 2021. The refinery took on a greater importance following the closure of Lysychansk Oil Refinery, making it the only operational oil refinery in Ukraine. Following the Russian invasion of Ukraine in 2022, the refinery became a frequent target of Russian attacks, and in April 2022, it was confirmed that the refinery was "completely destroyed".

== History ==
Construction of the plant began in 1961, and it became fully operational in 1961 with the commissioning of a desalting unit and an atmospheric-vacuum tubular unit. From 1967 to 1969, additional equipment for gas fractionation and catalytic reforming was constructed, along with a combined unit GK-3 and auxiliary hydrogen units. At its construction, the refinery was the first in modern-day Ukraine to introduce catalytic cracking and catalytic reforming, and the first in the Soviet Union to implement an industrial wastewater treatment system that discharged no effluent into natural water bodies.

In the 1970s and 1980s, further expansion took plant including the introduction of a new sulphur production unit and a combined LK-6U processing unit. Following the collapse of the Soviet Union, the plant came under the now independent Ukrainian control, and further modernisation was carried out between 2006 and 2009, which replaced the catalyst systems and some internal equipment. It also passed through a series of ownership changes following the collapse, which led the plant to supply below capacity. However, it became more important in 2012 when it became the only operational oil refinery following the closure of Lysychansk Oil Refinery. In 2016, Ukrtatnafta reported that it was only functioning at 25% of its capacity.

=== Destruction ===
On April 3, 2022, Dmytro Lunin, the acting governor of Poltava Oblast announced that the oil refinery has been "completely destroyed" after a Russian attack. In May, the Russians launched at the destroyed refinery four missiles. Yuriy Vitrenko, the CEO of Naftogaz, said at a June 21 press conference "All oil refining in Ukraine is now shut down due to massive repeated attacks" by the Russians.

The refinery faced more attacks on 1 November 2023, though this time the fire was quickly extinguished. In statements to the Verkhovna Rada, the then Ukrainian Minister of Energy, Denys Shmyhal, said the refinery alone had been targeted by 69 missiles and 260 drones since the start of the invasion. Due to the attacks, there has also been significant environmental damage, including the release of pollutants, which could in the future affect migration and groundwater. The damaged electricity substation at the refinery was also stated to possibly have polychlorinated biphenyls, which, if burned, produce a highly toxic substance.

== See also ==
- Ukrtatnafta
- Tatneft
- List of oil refineries
- Lysychansk Oil Refinery
- Odesa Refinery
