= Kachanivsky oil field =

Oil field in Sumy Oblast, Ukraine

Kachanivsky
- Country: Ukraine
- Region: Sumy Oblast
- Offshore/onshore: onshore
- Operator: Ukrnafta

Field history
- Discovery: 1953
- Start of development: 1960
- Start of production: 1960

Production
- Estimated oil in place: 17.9 million tonnes (~ 20.2×10^{6} m^{3} or 127 million bbl)

The Kachanivsky oil field is a Ukrainian oil field that was discovered in 1953. It began production in 1960 and produces oil. The total proven reserves of the Kachanivsky oil field are around 127 million barrels (17.9 million tonnes), and production is centered on 2,000 barrels per day (320 m^{3}/d).

== History ==
The field was first discovered in 1953 and began production in 1960. Hydrocarbon accumulations in the field have been identified in Triassic, Permian, Upper, Middle, and Lower Carboniferous deposits since then. Since the collapse of the Soviet Union, the field has been administered by Ukrnafta under its subsidiary department "Okhtyrkanaftohaz", which is headquartered in nearby Okhtyrka.

In more recent years, the field has had to rehaul its infrastructure for more environmentally friendly items because of assessments by the Okhtyka City Council. For example, Ukrnafta had to recultivate a sludge pit (although it had already been decommissioned), with the liquid and semi-liquid waste processed using a hydrocarbon mixture. The product of this will be fed back into the crude oil stream of the field.
