= Lysychansk Oil Refinery =

Oil refinery in Luhansk Oblast, Ukraine

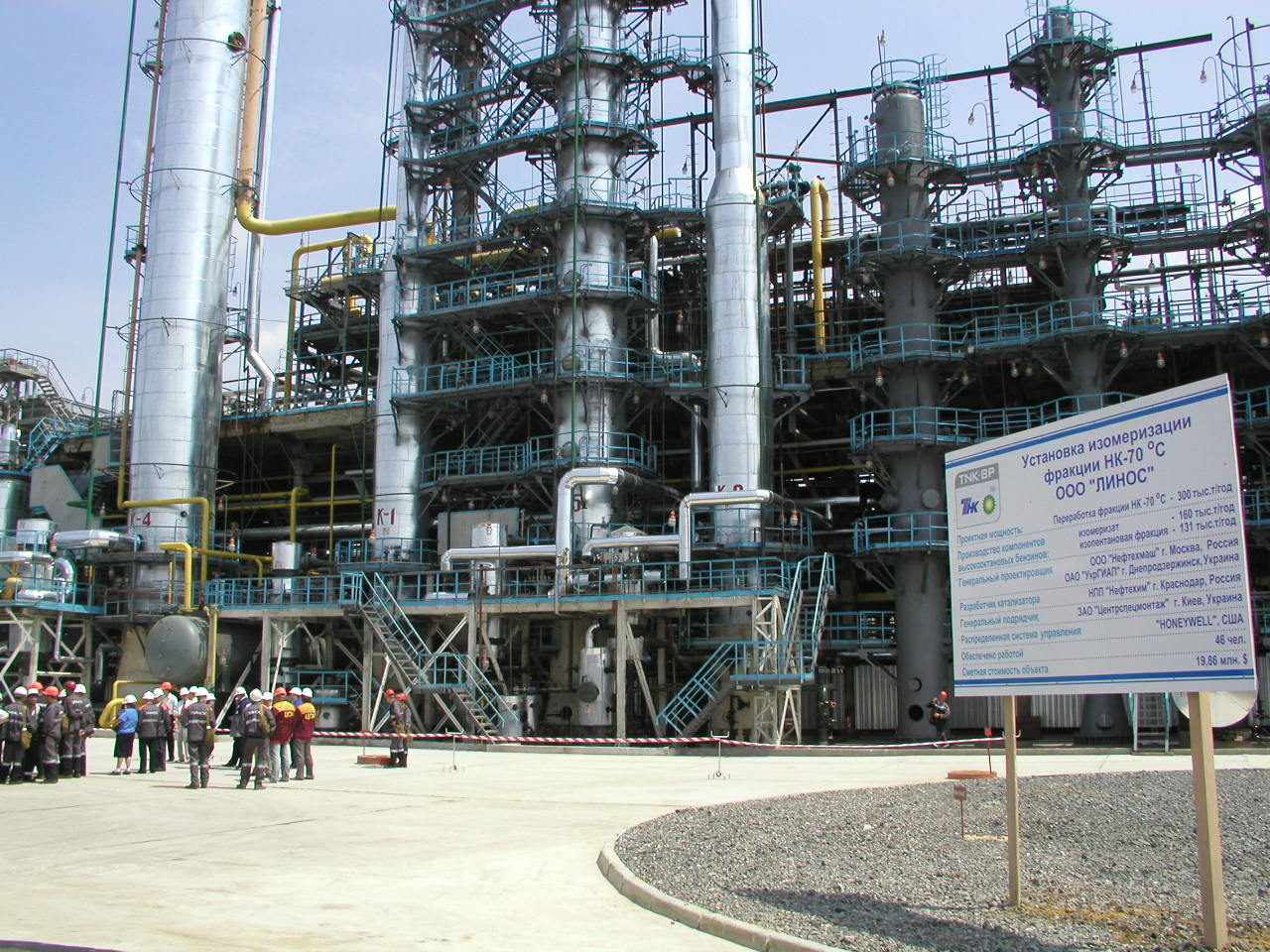
- Native name: Лисичанський нафтопереробний завод
- Type: Business, enterprise
- Founded: 1976
- Defunct: 2012
- Headquarters: Lysychansk, Ukraine
- Parent: Rosneft

PJSC Lysychansk Oil Investment Company (abbreviated as LiNIK; «ЛИНІК») was the second largest oil refinery in Ukraine, capable of refining 16 million tons of oil per year. It is located at Verkhnokamianka, Luhansk Oblast, about 10 km from the outskirts of Lysychansk city.

Construction of the facility began in 1976, making it one of the newest refineries in Ukraine and the last of Ukraine's major refineries to be commissioned. Following the start of privatisation in Ukraine following the collapse of the Soviet Union, the refinery came under the JSC Lysychanskriaftoorgsyntes. In 2000, Russian company TNK-BP acquired the controlling stake in the refinery, during which time LiNIK exported approximately 80% of its total gasoline production to Russia. In March 2012, TNK announced it was suspending all operations at the refinery, citing the unprofitability of oil in Ukraine, and it was shut down. In 2013, TNK was acquired by Rosneft. It was announced that production would restart in the spring of 2014, but this never happened following the outbreak of the War in the Donbas, as it was the target of frequent shelling.

Following the start of the full Russian invasion of Ukraine in 2022, the refinery became an active battle site, and fires and strikes destroyed much of the refinery. Satellite imagery estimated that at least 38% of the refinery had been damaged. Russian forces captured the refinery in June 2022, during the Battle of Lysychansk of the 2022 Russian invasion of Ukraine. The de facto Russian occupation, the Luhansk People's Republic, announced the refinery would not start restoration until at least the war ended.

== History ==
=== Soviet Union ===
Construction for the refinery began in 1976, when its ELOU-AVT No. 1 atmospheric-vacuum distillation unit was commissioned. Three years later, in 1979, a second was commissioned alongside the EP-300 ethylene production facility, which at the time was the largest-volume ethylene production operation in the Soviet Union. There were further units installed in the 1980s alongside two catalytic benzine reforming units. During its time under the Soviet Union, the refinery was mainly oriented towards supplying dark petroleum to the Donbas and light petroleum to the Russian SFSR in Stavropol and Krasnodar. Production peaked in 1991 at 23.7 million tonnes.

=== In Ukraine ===
Following the start of privatisation in the now independent Ukraine, following the collapse of the Soviet Union, the joint-stock company Lysychanskriaftoorgsyntes was created to manage the refinery. In 1994, a catalytic cracking unit was added. In 2000, the Russian oil company, TNK-BP, acquired a controlling stake in the refinery. In 2002, TNK made a subsidiary entitled PJSC Lysychansk Oil Investment Company, to control the refinery, which was popularly abbreviated as LiNIK. After the Russian acquisition, LiNIK exported approximately 80% of its total gasoline production to Russia. In 2011, the European Court of Human Rights recognised the Ukrainian company Agrocomplex as being owed overdue debts from the refinery debating to bankruptcy proceedings from 1996 to 2004. In 2017, the Ministry of Justice of Ukraine said that a lawsuit was intended to be filed to recover almost 1 billion hryvnias from Rosneft over the claim.

In March 2012, TNK suspended all oil supplies to the refinery and ceased production there, citing the unprofitability of oil refining in the present state of Ukraine. The last active unit at the refinery was shut down on 15 March 2012. Didier Casimiro later stated that while LiNIK was the youngest and most technically equipped refinery in Ukraine, it was still unprofitable, but that there could still possibly be a future return to production. Subsequently, the refinery's facility was put up for sale, including to Group DF and VETECH. A sale never happened because of the acquisition of TNK by Rosneft in 2013, after which the refinery was integrated into the company's structures in July 2013.

==== War in the Donbas ====
Following the integration, production was briefly resumed, and in late 2013 Igor Pavlov of Rosneft announced the company intended to restart the refinery in the spring of 2014 following plans to modernise it to a standard European fuel code and to increase output. However, this never happened due to the start of the War in the Donbas between Russian proxies and Ukrainian forces. In July 2014, during active fighting in the area, an oil storage tank caught fire and destroyed buildings in the refinery. In May 2015, fighters from the Dzhokhar Dudayev Battalion, a Ukrainian volunteer unit of Chechen volunteers, broke into the refinery's sanatorium facility and held the director at gunpoint. They later confirmed they demanded accommodation, and that they had broken it because the facility belonged to the Russian capital as it was under Rosneft, which they saw as justification.

Following the start of the Russian invasion of Ukraine, the refinery became an active battle site due to its close proximity to the frontline city of Lysychansk. Shelling destroyed parts of the facility, and in March 2022, it was reported that strikes destroyed or partially destroyed oil tanks of the refinery, and there were multiple reported fires. In April 2022, a significant fire broke out at two water treatment ponds, and in May 2022, more fires spread across the facility with smoke plumes stretching more than 4 km from the site.

After the start of the Battle of Lysychansk in June 2022, Russian forces occupied the refinery variously, as by 30 June it was reported Russian Armed Forces had taken the north-eastern and south-western sections of the facility. This was confirmed by the Luhansk Oblast Governor Serhiy Haidai. At the time, the Russian Defence Ministry stated they had seized it alongside a mine, another plant, and a village, but this was not confirmed by Reuters independently. By July, it was confirmed that Russian forces controlled the entirety of the defunct refinery.

Later satellite imagery estimated that at least 38% of the buildings of the refinery had been damaged due to heavy shelling during the fighting. The fires at the water treatment pond, which contained sludge oil, were considered a significant environmental concern, and smoke from fires also contained high concentrations of toxic substances. Even prior to this, a 2017 study had found elevated concentrations of vanadium and strontium in soils surrounding the refinery following the 2014 conflict, and a separate 2019 study found moderately dangerous pollution concentrations.

As of 2025, the refinery remains under Russian occupation, and it remains defunct. The de facto Russian state that it is in, the Luhansk People's Republic, stated that consideration of restoring the refinery would be delayed until the end of the Russo-Ukrainian War.

== See also ==
- Kremenchuk Oil Refinery
- Odesa Refinery
- Glusco (gas stations)
