= MCSR =

MCSR may refer to:

- Magnetically controlled shunt reactor
- Midnight Club: Street Racing
- Minecraft speedrunning
