= Hnidintsivsky oil field =

Oil field in Chernihiv Oblast, Ukraine

Hnidintsivsky
- Country: Ukraine
- Region: Chernihiv Oblast
- Offshore/onshore: onshore
- Operator: Ukrnafta

Field history
- Discovery: 1959
- Start of development: 1965
- Start of production: 1965

Production
- Estimated oil in place: 38 million tonnes (~ 43×10^{6} m^{3} or 270 million bbl)

The Hnidintsivsky oil field is a Ukrainian oil field that was discovered in 1959. It began production in 1965 and produces oil. The total proven reserves of the Hnidintsivsky oil field are around 270 million barrels (38 million tonnes), and production is centered on 2,000 barrels per day (320 m^{3}/d).

Oil from the field is sent to the oil refinery in Kremenchuk while the gas goes to the pipeline to Kyiv.

== History ==
The field was first discovered in 1959. In 1965, oil production began, and three years later, in 1968, gas production also started. Since then, three hydrocarbon levels have been identified at the field, with the first layer containing oil with low sulphur, the middle layer comprising gas condensates, and the lowest level at the field containing two oil and gas condensate horizons. In recent years, the field has been classified as being in an advanced stage of development, and a new oil formation of dolarenite.

In 2019, the field's main operator, Ukrnafta, announced plans to drill 20 new wells at the field following the extension of the permit for 20 more years. In 2023, Ukrnafta also drilled a lateral wall. Previous to these wells, though, was Well No. 255, which was drilled in 2015 with an initial oil production rate of 7.5 tonnes per day, but by August 2022, this had declined to only 1.5 tonnes of oil per day.
