= Zaporozhtransformator =

Ukrainian transformer company

Zaporozhtransformator (ZTR) PJSC.
- Type: Public company
- Industry: Electrical equipment
- Predecessor: Zaporozhye Transformer Plant
- Founded: 1947
- Headquarters: Zaporizhzhia, Ukraine
- Area served: Worldwide
- Key people: Igor Kleyner (CEO)
- Products: Power transformers, Shunt reactors, Controlled shunt reactors
- Number of employees: 2,500 (June 2014)
- Website: www.ztr.com.ua

Zaporozhtransformator (ZTR) is a Private Joint Stock Company (formerly Zaporozhye Transformer Plant) specializing in the design and manufacturing of oil-filled power transformers, shunt reactors and magnetically controlled shunt reactors, with production facilities located in Zaporizhzhia, Ukraine.

== General information ==
- The company was established in 1947 as Zaporozhye Transformer Plant for providing the USSR booming electricity industry with High Voltage (10kV - 1150 kV) power transformers. In 1994, due to a privatization process, the enterprise became Zaporozhtransformator Joint Stock Company.
- ZTR production capacity - 60 000 MVA per annum.
- Total plant area - 700 000 sq.m., production area - 230 000 sq. m.
- Historical maximum production output – 70 000 MVA p.a. was reached in 1988.
- 564 transformers with a total capacity of 50 300 MVA were produced in 2012.
- The Management System is certified to International standards ISO 9001:2008, ISO 14001:2004, OHSAS 18001:2007.
- ZTR supplies 86 countries worldwide (2017).
- The company has representative offices in Moscow (Russia) and Almaty (Kazakhstan).

== Joint ventures ==
ZTR-ENESTA Handelsgesellschaft m.b.H., Linz, Austria, a joint-venture between Voest Alpina Intertrading Aktiengesellschaft and ZAPOROZHTRANSFORMATOR PJSC, is selling power transformers to utilities, industrial users and EPC contractors worldwide.

== History ==
- 1947 – Commencement of construction of Zaporozhye transformer factory
- 1949 – Production of the first transformer 1000 kVA 10 kV
- 1955 – Production of the first single-phase transformers rated for voltage 400 kV and power 90 MVA for the transmission line of HPP Kuybishevskaya, Moscow
- 1960–1969
  - Production of series of 250 MVA autotransformers rated for power up to and the transformers up to 400 MVA, 330 kV
  - Production of the first three-phase autotransformer 250 MVA, 500 kV, equipped with in-built on-load tap changer;
  - Production of the first converter transformer 90 MVA for DC transmission line ± 400 kV, Volgograd – Donbas
  - Production of the world-first single-phase autotransformer rated for voltage class 750 kV, 417 MVA, 750/500 kV for experimental transmission line Konakovo–Moscow
  - Production of transformers 206 MVA, 500 kV and autotransformers 167 MVA, 500/220 kV for Aswan hydraulic complex (Egypt)
  - Production of high-capacity power transformer 630 MVA, 220 kV for Krasnoyarskaya Hydro Electric Power Station (Russia)
- 1970–1979
  - Production of experimental transformer 210 MVA, 1140 kV for AC transmission line 1200 kV;
  - Production of autotransformer 267 MVA, 500/220 kV equipped with on-load tap changer in 220 kV line
  - Production of transformer rated for 1000 MVA, 330 kV for operation as a unit with generator 800,000 kW at CPP Slavyanskaya, (Ukraine)
  - Production of three-phase autotransformer 560 MVA, 330/110 kV for substation “Coventry”, (USA);
  - Production of single-phase autotransformers for industrial transmission lines rated for new voltage class 750 kV: 333 MVA, 750/330 kV and 417 MVA, 750/500 kV
  - Production of the first converter transformer 175 MVA as well as the first smoothing reactor 1200 А, 4 Gn for DC transmission line ±750 kV, Ekibastuz-Centre (HVDC Ekibastuz–Centre)
  - 1977 - Production of 100000-th transformer stating from the company startup, namely three-phase transformer 1 000 MVA, 330 kV for CCPP Uglegorskaya, (Ukraine);
  - Development and introduction of unified series of single-phase on-load tap changers for the main network transformers rated for power 63–250 MVA;
  - Production of super-power three-phase transformer 1250 MVA, 330 kV for NPP Uzhnoukrainskaya
  - Production of autotransformer 667 MVA, 1150/500 kV;
  - Production of single-phase step-up transformers 417 MVA, 750 kV for 1000 MW units at Leningrad NPP;
  - Production of single-phase step-up transformers 533 MVA, 500 kV (three-phase bank capacity is 1 600 MVA) purposed for operation in unit with two generators rated for 640 MW each, HPP Sayano-Shushenskaya (Russia), as well as for thermal power plants – with generators 1 200 MW
- 1980-1989
  - Production of transformer rated for power 1 000 MVA, 500 kV, purposed for operation in unit 800 MW at CPP Ryazanskaya, (Russia)
  - Development of equipment complex for DC transmission line 1500 kV: converter transformers 320 MVA rated for voltage ±400 and ±750 kV, equipped with power winding 500 kV
  - Production of single-phase unit transformer 417 MVA, 1150 kV
  - Production and successful testing as for short-circuit stability of step-up transformers: single-phase unit 333 MVA, 750 kV and three-phase unit 666 MVA, 500 kV
  - ZTR reached a historical maximum of annual production output exceeding the figure of 70 000 MVA
- 1990-1999
  - Implementation of quality management system corresponding to ISO 9001 standard
  - Production of single-phase shunt reactors 110 MVAr for transmission line 750 kV, (Ukraine), as well as shunt reactors 33.3 MVAr, 400 and 500 kV (Egypt)
  - Production of the first three-phase controlled shunt reactor 25 MVAr, 110 kV;
  - Single-phase transformer 62,5 MVA, 163 kV and three-phase transformer 63 MVA, 154 kV were successfully tested for dynamic stability in test center KEMA (the Netherlands)
- 2000-2013
  - Development and production of control and monitoring systems;
  - Production of single-phase autotransformer 500 MVA, 765/345 kV with voltage regulation in 345 kV line, of shunt reactor 120 MVAr, 800 kV, of three-phase controlled shunt reactor 100 MVAr, 220 kV of fundamentally new design;
  - Production and supply of the 15 power transformers and autotransformers to Boguchanskaya Hydro Power Plant, Russia
  - Production of the first single-phase autotransformers 267 MVA, 400/230 kV, having transverse regulation in 220 kV line for Bulgaria
  - Production and commissioning of the controlled shunt reactor rated for power 180 MVAr, 330 kV
  - Setting-up of representative offices in Moscow (Russia), Almaty (Kazakhstan) (2003, 2005)
  - Production of phase-shifting transformer 400 MVA, 220 kV for Kazakhstan
  - Large-scale modernization of the production and testing facilities was carried out. The volume of investments in renovation exceeded $80 mil.;

== Fields of products application ==
=== Electricity companies ===
- Power Generation Plants
  - Hydro
  - Heat (CCPP)
  - Nuclear (NPP)
  - Solar
  - Wind
  - Geothermal
- Transmission grids
  - 110–765 kV substations
- Distribution networks
  - 35–150 kV substations

=== Industrial companies ===
- Oil&Gas
- Metallurgy
- Mining
- Railway

== 2022 Nationalisation ==
On November 6, 2022, the government of President Volodymyr Zelenskyy used martial law to seize control of the company. “Such steps, which are necessary for our country in conditions of war, are carried out in accordance with current laws and will help meet the urgent needs of our defense sector.” The government of Ukraine also took control of engine maker Motor Sich, energy companies Ukrnafta and Ukrtatnafta and vehicle maker KrAZ at the same time.
