= Lelyakivsky oil field =

Oil field in Chernihiv Oblast, Ukraine

Lelyakivsky
- Country: Ukraine
- Region: Chernihiv Oblast
- Offshore/onshore: onshore
- Operator: Ukrnafta

Field history
- Discovery: 1954-1961
- Start of development: 1963
- Start of production: 1964

Production
- Estimated oil in place: 52.4 million tonnes (~ 59.1×10^{6} m^{3} or 372 million bbl)

The Lelyakivsky oil field (Ukrainian: Леляківське нафтогазоконденсатне родовище) is a Ukrainian oil field that was discovered in 1963. It began production in 1965 and produces oil. The total proven reserves of the Lelyakivsky oil field are around 372 million barrels (52.4 million tonnes), and production is centered on 2,000 barrels per day (320 m^{3}/d).

== History ==
The field was first discovered between 1954 and 1961, and was first included in the state balance in 1963. Production formally began in 1964. The field has, historically, been one of the biggest onshore oil fields within the former Soviet Union states, with over 100 wells being drilled at the site. The field's license belongs to Kashtan Petroleum, which is a joint venture of Ukrnafta who holds a 55% stake and Shelton Petroleum, which holds a 45% stake. The field was briefly shut down starting in October 2010, but in 2011, the State Geology Service of Ukraine renewed the license for 2011, which allowed production to restart. Prior to this suspension, the field at the time was producing 113.2 tonnes of oil and gas condensate per day. Since its ownership by Kashtan, multiple wells have been drilled in order to use up the remaining oil reserves.

In October 2024, the Swedish company Zhoda Investments, which by then held the 45% stake in Kashtan, launched a program for a major overhaul of the field to more than double oil production. The programme that was called for included bringing seven wells back into operation. As reported then, despite the Russian invasion of Ukraine, the field remained undamaged but had declined production due to low investment.
