= Andrey Adamovskiy =

Ukrainian businessman (born 1962)

Andrey Adamovskiy Андрій Григорович Адамовський
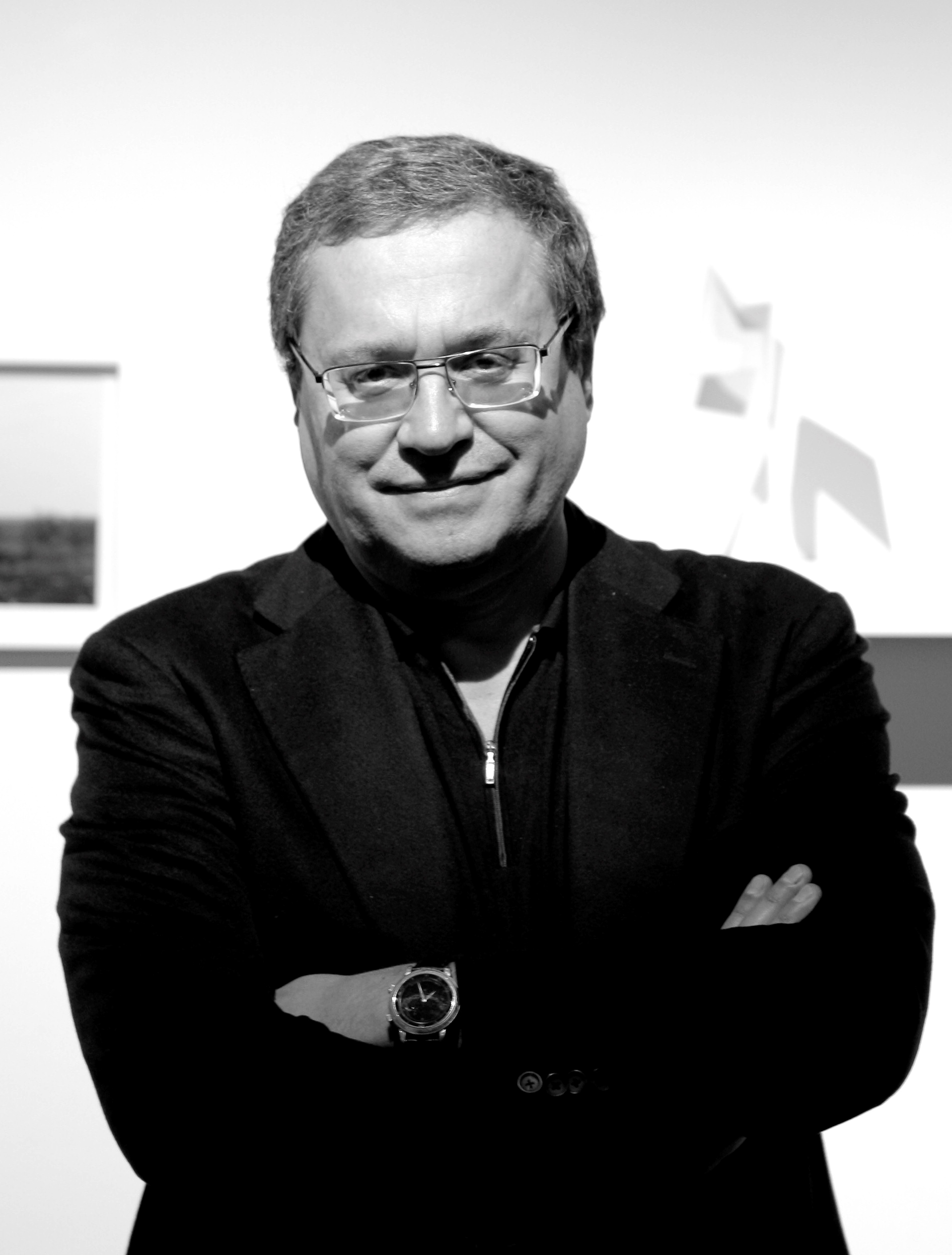
- Born: March 1, 1962 (age 64); Frunze (Bishkek), Kirghiz SSR
- Education: Kyrgyz National University
- Occupations: businessman, contemporary art collector
- Children: 2
- Website: https://adamovskiy.foundation

Andrey Adamovskiy (Ukrainian: Андрій Григорович Адамовський, Andrii Hryhorovych Adamovskyi) (born March 1, 1962, Frunze, now Bishkek) – Ukrainian businessman and philanthropist. Honorary Academician of the National Academy of Arts of Ukraine.

== Early life ==
Adamovskiy was born on March 1, 1962, in Bishkek, the capital of Kyrgyzstan (at that time – Frunze).

== Biography ==
His first large business was the telecommunications company "FARLEP", which served more than 200,000 customers. In 2005, the businessman sold the asset to the "SCM Group", which belongs to Rinat Akhmetov.

Earlier, in 2003, he became a shareholder and a board member of the "Industrial Union of Donbass". In 2006 he sold his shares.

He was a co-owner of 120 "Ukrtatnafta" filling stations through "VikOil". In 2010, he sold a stake in "VikOil" to the British-Russian oil company "TNK-BP".

Since 2007 Andrey Adamovskiy has been working in the commercial real estate market. Business park named after Maxim Gorky worth about $1 billion was not implemented due to the 2008 financial crisis. In 2011, Adamovskiy sold this multifunctional complex.

Today Andrey Adamovskiy is the owner of Art Mall – a multifunctional complex with about 200 shops, development and recreation areas for children.

=== Conflict around Sky Mall ===
In 2010, Adamovskiy invested $40 million in Sky Mall shopping center, receiving 50% plus 1 share. The terms of the agreement with the Estonian businessman Hillar Teder, who started building a shopping center in 2006, stipulated that the share of Adamovskiy could be sold back for $50 million. However, Adamovskiy refused to sell his share to Teder, believing that Teder had violated the terms of the agreement.

In 2011, a London court confirmed the validity of Adamovskiy's actions and ordered a businessman to transfer a shareholder debt of about $100 million under the overall control of Adamovskiy and Teder. Estonian has not fulfilled the decision of the court.

In 2015, the Ukrainian courts including the Supreme Court established that Teder had no right to claim.

In May 2016, the London Court of International Arbitration decided to transfer all shares of Assofit Holdings Limited to the ownership of "Arricano Real Estate plc" no later than June 5 of the same year.

According to former head of the State Ecological Inspectorate of Ukraine Yegor Firsov and journalist Serhiy Ivanov, Hillar Teder tried to buy publications from well-known bloggers in order to spread inaccurate information about Adamovskiy and the situation with Sky Mall.

=== IT business ===
Andrey Adamovskiy is one of the founders of "Infomir". Infomir exports its products to 150 countries and is one of the largest IT-companies in Ukraine. Infomir's headquarter and manufacturing facilities are located in Odessa.

=== Public initiatives ===
Andrey Adamovskiy is active in social activities. He is a Vice President of the World Jewish Congress; Co-president of the Coordination Council of Jewish Organizations and Communities of Ukraine "Vaad"; a member of the supervisory board of the Jewish Confederation of Ukraine and a member of the supervisory board of the Jewish campus organization "Hillel".

In 2015, Adamovskiy made a report at a meeting of the executive committee of the World Jewish Congress. In the report he talked about whether the rights and freedoms of the Jews are respected and mentioned the interaction of Jewish organizations with representatives of the Ukrainian official authorities.

=== Patronage and the arts ===
In 2009, he founded the Center for Contemporary Art M17 in Kyiv.

In 2010, at the Sotheby's auction, Adamovskiy together with partners acquired a unique collection of paintings by Odessa avant-garde artists of the early 20th century.

From 2015, as co-president of the Vaad, Andrey Adamovskiy participates in the reconstruction of the ritual Farewell House at the Jewish cemetery of Chernivtsi "Beit Kadishin", built in 1905. With the support of the Government of (Germany), the World Association of Bukovinian Jews, the World Jewish Congress and patrons, it is planned to restoration the building until 2024. There will also be a three-level pavilion with a memorial museum, divided into thematic blocks with displays which will reflect the Austro-Hungarian period (from the middle of the XIX century to 1918), the period of Romanian rule (1918–1940), the period of the Soviet annexation of Northern Bukovina (1940–1941), the tragedy of the Holocaust, the postwar period and the Soviet period up to modern Ukraine.

In 2018, he co-founded the Collectors Club to develop the modern art of Ukraine.

== Family ==
Andrey Adamovskiy has two children — Dmitry, Jacob.
