= Zholbors Zhorobekov =

Kyrgyz political scientist

- Education: Jusup Balasagyn Kyrgyz National University
- Scientific career
- Fields: Political science
- Workplaces: Jusup Balasagyn Kyrgyz National University; Parliament of Kyrgyzstan; Bishkek Humanities University; Kyrgyz State Law Academy

Zholbors Zhorobekov is a Kyrgyz political scientist. For most of his career he was a professor at the Jusup Balasagyn Kyrgyz National University, and from 1995 to 1999 he was an acting member of the Kyrgyz parliament. He was also the head of the State Commission on Religious Affairs of the Kyrgyz Republic. He has been a provost of the Bishkek Humanities University, and chair of the Social Science and Humanities Department of the Kyrgyz State Law Academy.

== Career ==
From 1966 to 1967, Zhorobekov was the head librarian at the library in Besh-Burkan. The following year he worked as a primary school teacher in the Nookat District, and then worked in government geological surveys and machining in 1968 and 1969.

In 1970, Zhorobekov became a student at the Kyrgyz State University, where he studied history until 1974. From 1974 to 1979 he worked as research fellow there, and then in 1980 became a graduate student. He earned a PhD in political science, and became a professor at the Kyrgyz State University.

Zhorobekov's research has focused on Kyrgyz politics, particularly the Kygryz constitutional system, its executive, and its legislature. In 1997, Zhorobekov and the Kyrgyz political scientist Nur Omarov coauthored a monograph on migration patterns in Central Asia, with a focus on Kyrgyzstan. The book was called Etnodemograficheskie protsessy v Kyrgyzstane (Ethnodemographic processes in Kyrgyzstan).

In 2009, Zhorobekov wrote a book on the former president of Kyrgyzstan Kurmanbek Bakiyev. He has also written a book on Kyrgyz President Askar Akayev. Zhorobekov's other books include books on the Kygryz parliament and several other works on immigration.

In addition to academic work, Zhorobekov has also worked in politics and administration. From 1993 to 1995, he was the head of the Information and Analytics Center in the State Administration of the Osh Region. From 1995 to 1999, he was an acting member of the Parliament of Kyrgyzstan, where he also served as chairman of the committee on inter-ethnic and religious relations. Zhorobekov subsequently ran for election to the parliament in 2005, but was not elected. Zhorobekov was also the head of the State Commission on Religious Affairs of the Kyrgyz Republic. Beginning in 2002, Zhorobekov was Chair of the Social Science and Humanities Department of the Kyrgyz State Law Academy.

Zhorobekov is regularly cited in both Kygryz and international media and in publications by international organisations, including the Eurasia Daily Monitor, the Institute for War and Peace Reporting, and Kazakh TV, on topics relating to the Kyrgyz executive and legislature.

Zhorbekov has received the Order of Manas (ru), Kyrgyzstan's highest state award.
