= Hlynsko-Rozbyshevske oil field =

Oil field in Poltava Oblast, Ukraine

Hlynsko-Rozbyshevske
- Country: Ukraine
- Region: Poltava Oblast
- Offshore/onshore: onshore
- Operator: Ukrnafta

Field history
- Discovery: 1959
- Start of development: 1959
- Start of production: 1960

Production
- Estimated oil in place: 31.7 million tonnes (~ 35.8×10^{6} m^{3} or 225 million bbl)

The Hlynsko-Rozbyshevske oil field (Ukrainian: Глинсько-Розбишівське нафтогазоконденсатне родовище) is a Ukrainian oil field that was discovered in 1959 and began production in 1960. The total proven reserves of the oil field are around 225 million barrels (35,800,000 m^{3}), and production is centered on 2,000 barrels per day (320 m^{3}/d).

Most of the oil from the field is sent to an oil refinery in Kremenchuk, and gas products go from Shebelinka to Poltava to Kyiv via a pipeline.

== History ==
The field was first discovered in 1959 after exploration work was done around the area from 1952 to 1953 and 1956 to 1958. It was placed under the operation of the NVHU "Poltavanaftohaz", which has a share of 9% of Ukraine's total hydrocarbon output. As of January 2024, the field has a total of 63 wells that have been drilled, with estimated oil reserves from the state balance putting 61,686 thousand tonnes as balanced and 31,772 thousand tonnes as recoverable. The field, as of current, has three sub-districts known as northern, central, and southern, alongside four production workshops.

In 2024, Ukrnafta, announced they would be doing a tender for the workover of wells at the field.

== Environmental concerns ==
There has been significant concern in recent years regarding the groundwater in the shallow aquifer across most of the fields exceeding concentration limits that are allowed for chloride ions and mineralization. This was largely due to an accident that happened in 1970, and is not related to production. In the village of Kachanova, which is located near the field, chloride concentrations were found to exceed the permissible limit by up to 23.6 times. It will take at least another 100 years for the full normalization of the aquifer.
