= Lopushna oil field =

Ukrainian oil field

Coordinates: 48.28°N 26.01°E

Lopushna
- Country: Ukraine
- Region: Chernivtsi Oblast
- Offshore/onshore: onshore
- Operator: Ukrnafta

Field history
- Discovery: 1983
- Start of development: 1983
- Start of production: 1983

Production
- Estimated oil in place: 6.4 million tonnes (~ 7.2×10^{6} m^{3} or 45 million bbl)

The Lopushna oil field is a Ukrainian oil field that was discovered in 1983. It began production in 1983 and produces oil. The total proven reserves of the Lopushna oil field are around 45 million barrels (6.4 million tonnes), and production is centered on 2,000 barrels per day (320 m^{3}/d).

== History ==
The field was first theoretically identified by a seismic survey in either 1970 or 1972. In 1983, the Lopushna-3 well was recommended, which found an uncontrolled ejection of oil and gas, confirming there was a field in the area. In 1984, when testing confirmed an oil inflow to the field from the Cenomanian sandstones. The field finally started trial production in 1986, and between that date and 2000, approximately 526,000 tonnes of oil were extracted. Since the collapse of the Soviet Union, the license holder for the field has been Ukrnafta.

== Geology ==
The field is within the Pokuttya-Bukovyna Carpathians, and occurs at the junction between the Skyba zone (or Skyba Nappe) and the Boryslav-Pokuttia Zone. It is a brachyanticline, and it is classified as a tectonically shielded trap. It has three reservoir units consisting of limestones from the Upper Jurassic period, sandstones from the Cenomanian period, and sandstones from the Neogene period.
