= ZTR =

ZTR may refer to these things in Ukraine:

- ZTR Zaporizhia, a handball club
- Zaporozhtransformator, a tech company
- Zhytomyr International Airport
