= Kyrgyz National University =

- Жусуп Баласагын атындагы Кыргыз Улуттук Университети (Kyrgyz); Кыргызский национальный университет имени Жусупа Баласагына (Russian)
- Other name: KNU
- Type: State
- Established: 1925 (101 years ago)
- Location: Bishkek, Kyrgyzstan
- Website: www.knu.kg
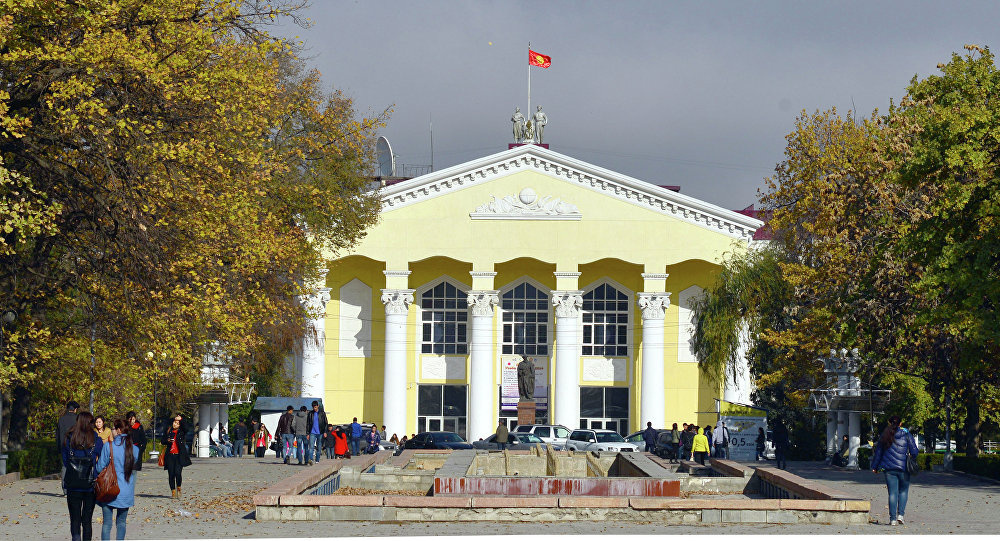

General information
- Location: Bishkek, Kyrgyzstan
- Coordinates: 42.8824°N 74.5871°E
- Completed: 1925

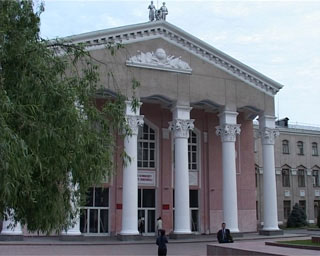
Kyrgyz National University

The Kyrgyz National University, (Note: Kyrgyz: Жусуп Баласагын атындагы Кыргыз Улуттук Университети, romanized: Jusup Balasagyn atyndagy Kyrgyz Uluttuk Universiteti, pronounced [t͡ɕʊ̥ˈsʊp bɑɫɑsɑˈʁɯn ɑtʰɯ̥ndɑˈʁɯ qʰɯrˈɢɯs ʊɫʊt̚ˈtʰʊχ ʊnʲɪvʲɪrsʲɪˈtʲetɪ]) named after renowned Maturidi poet Jusup Balasagyn, is a national university in Kyrgyzstan.

Kyrgyz National University is located in the capital city of Bishkek. It is the oldest and the largest Higher Education Institution of the Kyrgyz Republic. The institution was established on 25 October 1925 as the Kyrgyz Institute of Education.

In August 2023, Kyrgyz National University Faculty of Medicine established an understanding with Yenepoya University. During the meeting, issues of establishing and further developing mutually beneficial cooperation between the two universities in the fields of education, science, culture and other areas were discussed. The Indian side was also interested in the medical faculty of KNU. At the end of the meeting, the rector of KNU, Mr. Tolobek Abdyrakhmanov, and the Vice Chancellor of Yenepoya University, Mr. Mohammad Farhaad, signed a Memorandum of Cooperation between the Kyrgyz National University named after Zhusup Balasagyn and Yenepoya University. Yenepoya International Education, based in Bishkek, will be the official academic partners globally for Kyrgyz National University named after Zhusup Balasagyn in the Faculty of medicine from the year 2023 September and has thus become the first university in Central Asia to start a Faculty of Medicine in association with an International university. Kyrgyz National University named after Zhusup Balasagyn will also fulfill the international regulatory requirements for medical education including USMLE, UKMLE, NMC, ECFMG and others. From the year 2023 with this new collaboration the Kyrgyz National University will offer a 6 year MD Physician program using the teaching platform of Yenepoya International Education and Yenepoya University, India.

== History ==
On October 25, 1925, it was decided to open the Institute of Education. Its purpose was training the local population to be schoolteachers. In 1928, by the decision of the government of the Kirghiz Autonomous Socialist Soviet Republic, the Institute of Education was transformed into the Kirghiz Central Pedagogical Technical School. In August 1929, the institution added new buildings and equipment, as well as invited specialists and teachers from other Soviet republics. On 13 January 1932, by the decision of the Council of People's Commissars of the USSR, it was transformed into the Kyrgyz State Pedagogical Institute, named after Mikhail Frunze. There were 4 faculties in the institute: physics and mathematics, biology, literature and the faculty of social sciences. The first academic year began on October 3, 1933.

On 1 September 1939, the Kyrgyz Medical Academy was established with the recruitment of 200 students. On 21 May 1951, it was transformed into the Kyrgyz State University, with the following faculties: philology, biology, physics, mathematics, history, geology and geodesy. In the decree adopted by the Council of Ministers of the Kyrgyz SSR, the Kyrgyz State University belonged to higher educational institutions of the first category.

On December 11, 1972 it was renamed as the Kyrgyz State University on the 50th anniversary of the USSR. In 1982, the university was awarded the Soviet Union's Order of the Red Banner of Labor. On 11 August 1993, it was transformed into the Kyrgyz State National University (KGNU). By decree of President Askar Akayev on 11 May 2002, it was renamed after Yusuf Balasaghuni (Kyrgyz: Жусуп Баласагын).

== University structure ==
There is the Academical Worker's Union Committee, which defends the professional interests of educators. The supervisory function in the KNU is performed by the Board of Trustees, which includes prominent public figures, scientists and graduates. There are 8 members in total in the Board of Trustees. The highest collegiate management body in the KNU is the Scientific Council, in which there are 63 members.

=== Faculties ===
- Faculty of Medicine (Yenepoya International Education)
- Faculty of State and Municipal Management
- Faculty of Mathematics, Computer Science and Cybernetics
- Faculty of Physics and Electronics
- Faculty of Information and Innovation Technologies
- Faculty of Chemistry and Chemical Technology
- Faculty of Biology
- Faculty of Geography and Ecology and Tourism
- Faculty of Kyrgyz Philology
- Faculty of Russian and Slavic Philology
- Faculty of History and Regional Studies
- Faculty of Journalism
- Faculty of Social and Human Sciences
- Faculty of Foreign Languages
- Kyrgyz-European Faculty
- Faculty of International Relations and Oriental Studies
- Kyrgyz-Chinese Faculty
- Pedagogical Faculty
- Faculty of Retraining and Staff Development
- Faculty of State and Municipal Management
- Faculty of Economics
- Faculty of Law
- Faculty of Management and Business
- Faculty of Medicine and Surgery

=== Institutions ===
- Kyrgyz-Chinese Confucius Institute
- Institute of Basic Sciences

=== Colleges ===
- Medical College (Yenepoya International Education)
- Pedagogical college
- Juridical College
- College of Economics
- Kyrgyz-Chinese College
- IT College

=== Centers, departments, departments and sectors ===
- Korean Language Center
- Turkish Language Center
- Turkish Resource Center named after Aziz Sancar
- Japanese Language Center
- Department of International Cooperation
- Press Service
- Center for Language Studies
- General Department
- Central Archive
- Sector for Civil Defense and Special Mobilization Work
- Department of Legal Work
- Human Resources Department
- Educational-Methodical Management
- Department of Informatization and Coordination of Academic Work
- Sector of Licensing, Accreditation and Methodical Work
- Dispatching Service
- Department for the Preparation and Issuance of Documents on Education
- Department of Postgraduate Study, Doctoral Studies and Magistracy
- Scientific Library named after Asanbek Tabaldiev
- Department of Information Technology and Computer Maintenance
- State Language Department
- Educational Work Department
- Practice and Employment Sector
- Scientific-Research Center "Atmosphere Monitoring"
- Youth Committee
- Council of Young Scientists
- Alumni Association

=== Chairs ===
The National Gymnasium of the KNU and the Department of Physical Culture of Sports operate from the KNU campus. KNU housese 61 academical departments in 19 faculties.

== Vestnik KNU ==
The university's magazine, Vestnik, has been published since 1997. Vestnik is a scientific, educational, and informational publication registered by the Ministry of Justice of the Kyrgyz Republic.

Vestnik is included on the list of leading peer-reviewed scientific journals and publications recommended by the Higher Attestation Commission of the Kyrgyz Republic. The license agreement on the inclusion of the magazine in the list of publications the system of the Russian Science Citation Index (RSCI) was signed on 1 March 2016.

== Educational process in KNU ==
The educational process in KNU takes place in the following directions:

- Undergraduate: on campus and in absentia; 56 programs.
- Five year study: on campus and in absentia; 5 programs.
- Magistracy: on campus and in absentia; 32 programs.
- Secondary vocational education: on campus and in absentia; 14 programs.
- At the Faculty of Economics and Pedagogy in the city of Osh - in absentia; 10 programs.

The educational process follows the Bologna Process.

== KNU Rectors ==
Below is a list of rectors of KNU.

- 1951-1954 - B. Zhamgyrchinov
- 1954-1960 - B. Yunusaliev
- 1960-1977 - S. Tabyshaliev
- 1977-1979 - M. Imanaliev
- 1979-1986 - K. Otorbaev
- 1986-1992 - U. Asanov
- 1992-1998 - S. Toktomyshev
- 1998-2000 - A. Borubayev
- 2000-2005 - A. Kakeev
- 2005-2006 - I. Bolzhurova (Acting)
- 2006-2008 - Y. Omurkanov
- 2008-2009 - A. Bekbalaev
- 2010-2011 - A. Akunov
- 2011-2014 - I. Isamidinov
- 2015-2017 - C. Adamkulova
- 2017 - K. Sadykov.

== Faculty ==
As of the 2016-2017 academic year, there were 2,654 teaching staff at KNU. Of them, 1,908 people or 71.9% of the total number of full-time teachers held a scientific degree.

KNU also employs around 271 part-time or non-teaching staff. Of these employees, 183 (or 67.5%) also hold a top degree.

Counting both full-time and part-time instructors, KNU employed 67 professors and 339 associate professors.

== Notable alumni ==
- Turdakun Usubaliev - First Secretary of the Central Committee of the Communist Party of Kyrgyzstan, 1961–1985
- Shabdanbai Abdyramanov - People's Writer of Kyrgyzstan
- Andrey Adamovskiy - Ukrainian businessman and philanthropist
- Kazat Akmatov - People's Writer of Kirghizia
- Zholbors Zhorobekov - Kyrgyz political scientist
- Aron Brudny - Kirghiz scientist, psychologist and philosopher
- Medi Mamazairova - Kirghiz poet, Honored Worker of Culture of Kyrgyzstan
- Vladimir Ploski - Kirghiz scientist
- Shatman Sadybakasov - Kyrgyz journalist and editor
- ZAMAY - Kyrgyz-Russian rapper
- Ozgorush Sharshekeev - Kyrgyz scientist
- Alykul Osmonov - Kyrgyz poet, significant for his efforts to modernizing poetry in Kyrgyzstan
- Mukhamed Tsikanov - Russian statesman from Kabardino-Balkaria
- Rakhat Achylova - sociologist and member of the Supreme Council
- Idris Anarbekovich Kadyrkulov - Ambassador

== Library ==
The KNU Scientific Library is one of the largest university libraries in Kyrgyzstan. The scientific library was established in 1932 on the basis of the Kyrgyz Pedagogical Institute.

In 1941, the library's book stock was 134,000 texts, many obtained from the universities of Moscow, Leningrad and other major cities of the USSR. In 1951 the KNU library received educational, scientific and artistic literature from universities in Odessa, Kiev, Kharkov, Kazakh and Tomsk, as well as from the Academies of Sciences of Armenia, Georgia, Uzbekistan, and Ukraine.

Today, the library is located in 8 educational buildings and has 60 employees.
