= Tatneft =

Russian vertically integrated oil and gas company

PJSC Tatneft

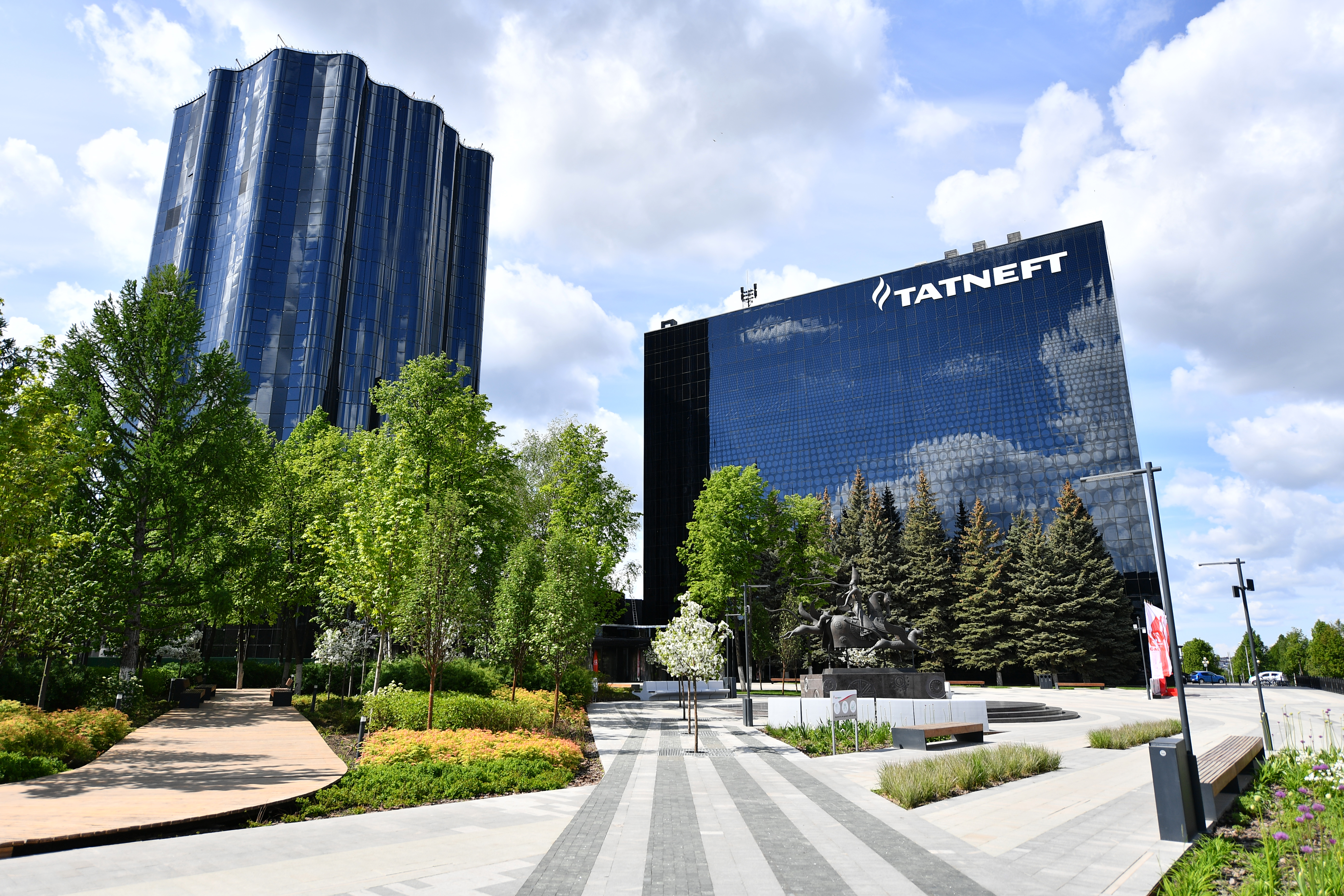
- Trade name: Tatneft
- Native name: ПАО «Татнефть» им. В. Д. Шашина
- Type: Public (PJSC)
- Traded as: MCX: TATN (ordinary shares); MCX: TATNP (preferred shares); LSE: ATAD (ADRs)
- ISIN: US8766292051
- Industry: Oil and gas
- Founded: 1950
- Founder: Ministry of Oil Industry
- Headquarters: Almetyevsk, Russia
- Key people: Rustam Minnikhanov (Chairman) Nail Maganov (CEO)
- Products: Petroleum; Natural gas Petrochemicals
- Revenue: $21.3 billion (2025)
- Operating income: $2.98 billion (2025)
- Net income: $1.78 billion (2025)
- Total assets: $25 billion (2025)
- Total equity: $15.5 billion (2025)
- Number of employees: 60,000 (2019)
- Website: www.tatneft.ru

Tatneft (Russian: публичное акционерное общество «Татнефть» имени В.Д. Шашина or ПАО «Татнефть» им. В.Д. Шашина; traded as: MCX: TATN (ordinary shares), MCX: TATNP (preferred shares), LSE: ATAD (ADRs)) is a Russian vertically integrated oil and gas company with headquarters in the city of Almetyevsk, Republic of Tatarstan, Russian Federation. It is the fifth largest oil company in Russia and the eighth largest listed company in Russia by market capitalization (as of 31 December 2019). In the 2020 Forbes Global 2000, Tatneft was ranked as the 539th-largest public company in the world.

Tatneft holds most of the exploration and production licenses and produces its crude oil in Tatarstan. Out of approximately 581.5 thousand barrels of oil produced daily, 35.5% (206.7 thousand barrels per day) is refined at Tatneft's TANECO refinery (as of 31 December 2019).

Tatneft is also involved in the treatment and refining of associated petroleum gas, petrochemicals, mainly tires, production and marketing, manufacturing of equipment, engineering, procurement, and construction services for oil, gas, and petrochemical projects, and, from the fourth quarter of 2016, upon obtaining control over Bank ZENIT, in banking activities.

== History ==
Tatneft was created by the Decree of the Council of Ministers of the USSR in April 1950 as a production association under the Ministry of Oil Industry of the USSR by uniting several drilling and derrick maintenance crews operating in Tatarstan.

Upon its establishment, Tatneft commenced the production from various crude oil fields in Tatarstan, most notably the Romashkino (Romashkinskoye) unique super-giant field discovered in 1948. By 1956, Tatneft became the largest crude oil producer in the USSR. In 1971 Tatneft extracted the 1st billionth tonne of crude oil. The annual crude oil production by Tatneft reached 104 million tonnes in 1975. In 2019 Tatneft's annual production was 29,798 thousand tonnes or 212,252 thousand barrels. In 2022, the company's revenue amounted to 1.3 trillion rubles.

In 1994, following its privatization, Tatneft was reorganized into an open joint-stock company. In October 1995, Tatneft shares started to be quoted on the Russian Trading System (RTS) and became one of the first constituents of the RTS Index RTSI. In December 2016 Tatneft listed its American Depositary Receipts (ADRs) on the London Stock Exchange LSE: ATAD Tatneft also had its ADRs listed on the New York Stock Exchange (stock symbol TNT) between March 1998 and September 2006.

In August 1999, Tatneft shares were listed on MICEX. The Moscow Exchange (which was formed following the merger of MICEX and RTS in 2011) is the primary market for Tatneft's ordinary MCX: TATN and preferred MCX: TATNP shares, and the London Stock Exchange LSE: ATAD for its ADRs.

Tatneft's ADR program is registered with the U.S. Securities and Exchange Commission as Level 1.

In 2005, Tatneft launched the project of building a new extensive refining and petrochemicals complex in Nizhnekamsk, Tatarstan, which was called TANECO (the company implementing the project and later operating the refinery received the same name – JSC TANECO). The first stage of the new refinery complex was completed in 2010 and put into operation in 2011.

In 2006, Tatneft launched a project to develop heavy oil natural bitumen (super-viscous or highly-viscous oil, HVO) reserves in Tatarstan. After exploring various options for carrying out the project in cooperation with its global peers, Tatneft decided to undertake it independently. As of 31 May 2020, Tatneft is producing over 65 thousand barrels of highly viscous oil per day from 1042 horizontal wells. Since 2013, the company has been developing under the leadership of Nail Ulfatovich Maganov.

Since September 2018, Tatneft has been implementing its 2030 Strategy, which encompasses, among other things, the growth of crude oil production, expansion of Tatneft's refining capabilities, its service station network, and the development of the petrochemicals segment.

In 2019 Tatneft acquired from Neste Oil Corporation the Russian fuel retail business consisting of 75 fuel stations in North-West Russia and a terminal in Saint Petersburg.

In November 2019 Tatneft completed the acquisition of certain assets, including the production of various types of synthetic rubber used for the manufacturing of high-performance tires, located in Togliatti, Samara Region, Russia, from SIBUR.

Bank Zenit was sanctioned by the UK in March 2023, with sanctions increased in December 2023 to include a prohibition on correspondent banking relationships.

== Operations ==
The main activities of Tatneft are:

- gas and oil exploration and production
- gas and oil refining and marketing
- petrochemicals (including Nizhnekamskshin tire-making plant)
- banking services (through its subsidiaries Bank Zenit and Bank Devon-Credit)

Tatneft is the first Russian oil company to develop a contract with Syria to extract oil. The contract became effective in March 2005.

In 2007, Tatneft had total proved reserves of approximately 6.140 billion barrels of crude oil according to the audit by Miller and Lents. It operated 77 oil fields, including the main field of the company – Romashkino, with total production capacity of 25 million tons of oil and a very high amount of natural gas annually. Other major oil fields include Novo-Yelokhov and Bavly. In addition to Russia, it conducts exploration and production operations in Libya, Angola, Syria, Iran, Vietnam, Oman, and Saudi Arabia. In 2008, Tatneft's crude oil production was 189 million barrels and was expected to shrink by 1.5% to 186 million barrels in 2009.

As of 1 July 2010, Tatneft had 626 filling stations, of which 490 are located on the territory of the Russian Federation and 136 are located in Ukraine.

In September 2007, Tatneft formed a strategic partnership with Royal Dutch Shell to develop heavy crude oil (bitumen) production in Tatarstan. It considers similar partnership with Chevron.

Through its subsidiary TANEKO, Tatneft is constructing the Nizhnekamsk refinery and petrochemical complex, which it intends to commission in phases in 2009 and 2011–2012. The complex will include of refineries with the capacity of seven million tons per year, deep oil conversion plant of 3.5 million tons per year and petrochemical plant, which will produce linear alkyl benzene for production of washing materials and oil lubricants, paraxylene and terephthalic acid for production of polyester fibers (u1074), cellophane film and bottles, and polypropylene. The complex is expected to cost US$3–3.2 billion, of which $2 billion was invested in 2008, and $1–1.2 billion would be invested in 2009.

Metal Mining Wire reports that in the first half of 2013, Tatneft installed 630 gas filling stations across Russia. In Ukraine, the number of filling stations has reached 114, and Belarus has received a total of eight gas filling stations. Tatneft delivered 730,000 tons of petroleum and gas products to its filling stations. Tatneft also upgraded many of its stations to deliver diesel fuel and eco-friendly grade five gasoline, both of which have a lower negative environmental impact than traditional gasoline. As of July 2013, Tatneft is evaluating the installation of solar panels at its filling stations to conserve resources.

In January 2022 Federal Antimonopoly Service approved the purchase by Tatneft of six oilfield service companies of "Tagras" holding: "Tagras-Khimservis", "Mekhservis-MPO", "NKT-Servis", "KRS-Servis", "TMS-Logistika" and "Tatburneft", all based in Almetyevsk.

== Shareholders ==
Shareholders of the company include the Republic of Tatarstan through its holding company Svyazinvestneftekhim.

== Controversies ==
Tatneft has an ongoing dispute with the Government of Ukraine over control in Ukrtatnafta, an owner of the Kremenchuk oil refinery. Ukrainian state-owned energy company Naftogaz Ukrainy owns 43.1% of shares in Ukrtatnafta, Tatneft owns 8.6% and the Government of Tatarstan owns 28.8%. 18% of the shares were transferred to two offshore companies affiliated with Tatneft, a transaction that was not recognized by Ukrainian authorities. According to the court decision, these shares were transferred to Naftogaz. In October 2007, a management change occurred, which is not recognized by Tatneft. In March, Tatneft filed an international arbitration against Ukraine.

On 9 July 2008, after signing an agreement between the United States and the Czech Republic to host a tracking radar for an antiballistic missile system, Tatneft reduced oil supplies through the Druzhba pipeline to the Czech Republic. Tatneft said that it re-routed volumes from the Czech Republic to Turkey due to better prices. Although officially the linkage between the reduction of oil supplies and the radar agreement was not claimed, it was suspected.

Assets of Tatneft in Ukraine were seized in May 2022, following the Russian invasion of Ukraine.

== Ecology ==
In 2013, TatNIPIneft, the Tatar Oil Research and Design Institute, developed a new technology called SSG-VUKSZHS, which enhances the depletion of oil reservoirs by utilizing a composition based on silica gel. The technology has been applied by Tatneft to enhance the recovery of oil, after winning the Grand Prix for best exhibit, engineering design, or technical solution at the XX International Oil and Gas Exhibition 2013 held in Baku, Azerbaijan, in June.

== See also ==
- Petroleum industry in Russia
