= Idris Anarbekovich Kadyrkulov =

Kyrgyz diplomat

Idris Anarbekovich Kadyrkulov Кадыркулов Идрис Анарбекович
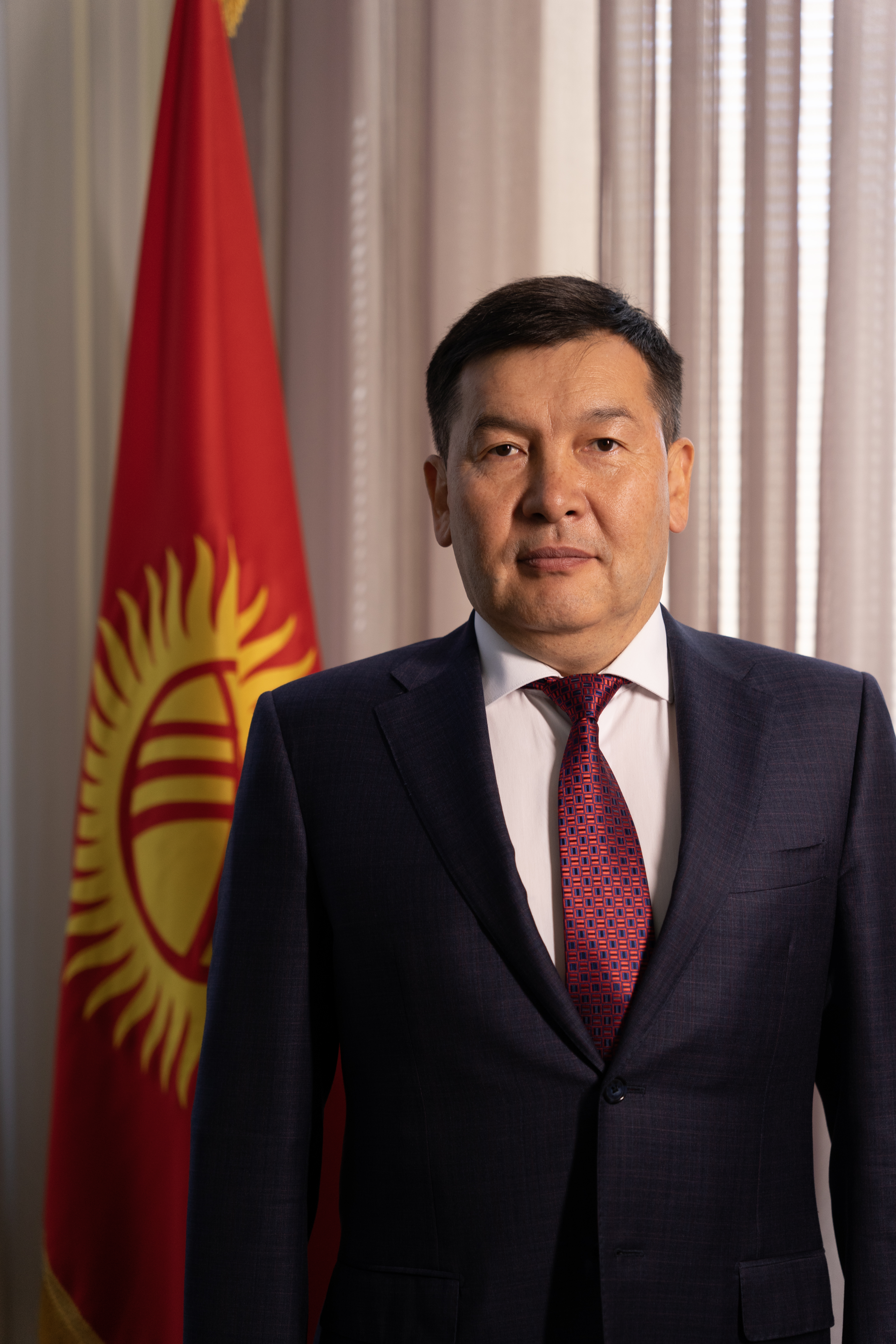
- Incumbent
- Assumed office 25 January 2022
- Sadyr Japarov

Personal details
- Born: 4 January 1971 (age 55) Kashka-Suu, Chüy Region, Kyrgyzstan

Idris Anarbekovich Kadyrkulov (Kyrgyz: Кадыркулов Идрис Анарбекович, born 4 January 1971) is a Kyrgyz diplomat and statesman. Ambassador Extraordinary and Plenipotentiary of Kyrgyz Republic to Ukraine (since 2022).

== Biography ==
=== Early life and education ===
Kadyrkulov was born on January 4, 1971, in the Kashka-Suu village, Sokuluk District, Chüy Region. He graduated from the Kyrgyz National University in 1996 with a degree in Economics and Organization of Management. Kadyrkulov later went on to earn a Master's degree in Higher School of Public Policy and Management from the Academy of Public Administration under the President of the Kyrgyz Republic in 2015 and a Master's degree in International Relations from the Diplomatic Academy of the Ministry of Foreign Affairs of the Kyrgyz Republic named after K. Dikambaev in 2019.

=== Career ===
- From 1994 to 1998, Kadyrkulov served in the internal affairs bodies of the Kyrgyz Republic.
- From 1998 to 2002, he served as an operative in line and territorial subdivisions of the State Committee for National Security of the Kyrgyz Republic.
- From 2002, he held senior positions in the departments of the State Committee for National Security (SCNS) in Bishkek, Chui and Batken regions, including as First Deputy Director of the State National Security Committee.
- In 2015-2016, he served as the First Deputy Chairman of the now-defunct State Drug Control Service.
- In 2016–2018 – Head of the department of the State Committee for National Security of Osh city and Osh region.
- On April 7, 2018, he was appointed Director of the National Security Risk Analysis and Forecasting Service with the rank of Deputy Head of the SCNS.
- From 20 April 2018 to 15 May 2019 – Chairman of the State Committee for National Security of the Kyrgyz Republic.
- Since 25 January 2022 – Ambassador Extraordinary and Plenipotentiary of the Kyrgyz Republic to Ukraine.
- On April 1, 2022, Kadyrkulov presented his credentials to the Director of the Department of State Protocol at the Ministry of Foreign Affairs of Ukraine.
- On 17 August 2022 Kadyrkulov presented his credentials to Ukrainian president Volodymyr Zelenskyy.
- Idris Kadyrkulov holds the rank of Colonel.

== Awards ==
1 September 2022 Idris Kadyrkulov received the Erdik medal for his significant contribution to the development of socio-economic, intellectual and cultural potential of the Kyrgyz Republic, the great achievements in professional activities, as well as in connection with the Independence Day of the Kyrgyz Republic.
