= Kanat Sadykov =

Kyrgyz former education minister and National University rector

Kanat Sadykov is the former Minister of Education and Science of Kyrgyzstan. In 2017 he became rector of the Kyrgyz National University.
