= Nur Omarov =

Kyrgyz political scientist

- Born: 1966
- Died: March 15, 2012
- Scientific career
- Fields: Political science
- Institutions: Kyrgyz-Russian Slavic University

Nur Omarov (1966—March 15, 2012) was a Kyrgyz political scientist. He was a professor at the Kyrgyz-Russian Slavic University.

== Career ==
Omarov was born in 1966. He earned a PhD in history and political science, and became a professor at the Kyrgyz-Russian Slavic University. He was also the president of the Kyrgyzstan Political Science Association. He was noted as a prominent expert on Kyrgyzstan within the Soviet Union.

Omarov conducted research on the relationship between Russia and Kyrgyzstan, and on Russia's position as a power in Central Asia. He also wrote on the future of Kyrgyzstan. In 1997, Omarov and the Kyrgyz political scientist Zholbors Zhorobekov coauthored a monograph on migration patterns in Central Asia, with a focus on Kyrgyzstan. The book was called Etnodemograficheskie protsessy v Kyrgyzstane (Ethnodemographic processes in Kyrgyzstan).

Omarov was quoted frequently on the politics of Kyrgyzstan and its international relations by news outlets and international organizations, including The Economist, Trend News Agency, AKIpress news agency, the Eurasia Daily Monitor, and the Institute for War and Peace Reporting.

In 2010 it was reported in The BBC that Omarov had been beaten near his home in Bishkek in a possible act of political repression, since he was outspoken about the political situation in Kyrgyzstan. He died of a heart attack in 2012.
