= Infomir =

Ukrainian electronics company (e. 1994)

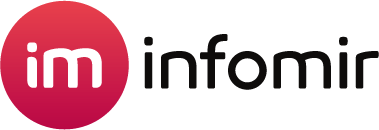
- Company type: Private business, Group of companies
- Industry: electronics, IT, software
- Founded: 1994; 32 years ago
- Founder: Andrey Adamovskiy
- Headquarters: Odesa, Ukraine
- Area served: Worldwide
- Products: Industrial and consumer electronics, software
- Number of employees: 500+ (2019)
- Website: https://www.infomir.eu/

Infomir is a Ukrainian company which produces industrial and consumer electronics, as well as software products. The group of companies covers up to 4% of the global IPTV/OTT set-top box market and supplies products to more than 160 countries.

The main office and production of Infomir are located in Ukraine. The company's contract partner is Jabil Circuit, which has 100 plants in 23 countries.

== History ==
The history of "Infomir" began in 1994 when "Farlep" (the group of companies) was founded, which specialized in providing telephone services and Internet access services. The group included a company that developed and produced telecommunications equipment and software. The products were produced both for Farlep's own needs, and for large customers – "Ukrzaliznytsya" and "Ukrtelecom".

- 2005, "Infomir" was founded.
- 2002 - the company acquired a license for smart electricity meters production.
- 2007 - In October "Infomir" Internet provider started its work. The company tested equipment and new technologies, studied the reaction of subscribers to new services.
- 2015 - "Infomir" released the first 4K set-top box.
- 2019, "Infomir" released the first 4K set-top box for Android TV.
- 2019 - In January "Infomir" joined the anti-piracy initiative "Clear Sky".

== Awards ==
In August 2012, Stalker Middleware received a prize in the nomination "The Best Domestic Development, presented at EEBC 2012 and expoTEL 2012".

In September 2018, the lighting reconstruction of the bridge connecting Lysychansk and Sievierodonetsk project received the Grand Prix at LED Expo 2018 in Kyiv.

In March 2019, Whooshi, a portable Bluetooth audio amplifier, received the Red Dot Design Award.
