= Rakhat Achylova =

Kyrgyz sociologist (1941–2015)

- Рахат Ачылова
- Born: 30 May 1941; Govsubar, Kirghiz SSR, Soviet Union
- Died: March 5, 2015 (aged 73)
- Occupations: Sociologist, politician

Academic background
- Education: Jalalabad State University; Saint Petersberg State University
- Thesis: (1988)
- Academic advisor: Asanbek Tabaldiev

Academic work
- Discipline: Sociology
- Institutions: Kyrgyz National University

Rakhat Achylova (Kyrgyz: Рахат Ачылова; 30 May 1941 – 5 March 2015) was a sociologist from Kyrgyzstan, who studied the roles of women and the family, as well as Islam in her country. She was a member of the Supreme Council from 1995 to 2000.

== Biography ==
Achylova was born on 30 May 1941 in the village of Govsubar, in the Batken region of the Kirghiz Soviet Socialist Republic. She graduated from Jalalabad State University in 1958. In 1963 she joined the History Department at Kyrgyz National University as a lecturer. She then moved from the History Department to the Department of Sociology. Here she worked in the first social sciences laboratory under the supervision of Asanbek Tabaldiev (ky). In 1975, after the death of Tabaldiev, she became Head of the Department of Social Sciences, until 1987. In 1988 she graduated with a PhD from Saint Petersberg State University. She later was appointed Rector of the V. Mayakovsky Kyrgyz Women's Pedagogical Institute. She was also chair of the Centre for Independent Women in Development in Kyrgyzstan.

In 1995 she was elected to the Jogorku Kenesh (Supreme Council) of Kyrgyzstan. Her tenure on the Council ended in 2000. In 2006 she was a member of the Presidential Commission for National Ideology.

Achylova died on 5 March 2015, after suffering a heart attack. Her civil funeral was held on 7 March at the Kyrgyz National Academic Theatre named after T. Abdumomunov. She was later buried at Baitek Cemetery.

== Awards and honours ==
- Honoured Worker of Science and Education of the Kyrgyz Republic.

== Legacy ==
Ala-Too International University has named an annual prize after Achylova. The prize is awarded to researchers working in the fields of sociology, economics and philosophy. The award was founded by the economist, Beishenaly Nazik.

== Selected works ==
- 'Political culture and foreign policy in Kyrgyzstan', in Tismaneanu V., Political culture and civil society in Russia and the new states of Eurasia (1995).
- Achylova, R. (1995) ‘Bednost' v Kyrgyzstane: v anfas i profil'’ [Poverty in Kyrgyzstan: In full-face and profile], Kut Bilim, 6.
- Achylova, R. (1987) Нация и семья [Nation & Family].

== Historiography ==
Achylova's research covered the role of state formation in former Soviet Socialist Republics, as well as the role of women and the role of minority groups within them. She recognised that there were considerable obstacles to the creation of a civil society in Kyrgyzstan. Despite this she also recognised the independence and autonomy are central to Kyrgyz mentalities.

As a sociologist, she was part of a movement in the 1980s and 1990s to a movement that had an increasingly critical and analytical role. In the 1990s she organised the first programme of study on Kyrgyz family life and marriage. Achylova also considered the role of Islam in Kyrgyz society, and its place in nationalist discourse, discussing how aspects of Tengrism were adopted into Kyrgyz Islam.
