= Switchyard reactor =

Power grid system inductors

In an electric power transmission grid system, switchyard reactors are large inductors installed at substations to help stabilize the power system.

For transmission lines, the space between the overhead line and the ground forms a capacitor parallel to transmission line, which causes an increase in voltage as the distance increases. To offset the capacitive effect of the transmission line and to regulate the voltage and reactive power of the power system, reactors are connected either at line terminals or at the middle, thereby improving the voltage profile of transmission line.

In large systems with many generators connected in parallel, it may be necessary to use a series reactor to prevent excessively large current flow during a short circuit; this protects transmission line conductors and switching apparatus from damage due to high currents and forces produced during a short circuit.

A shunt reactor is connected in parallel with a transmission line or other load. A series reactor is connected between a load and source.

== Bus reactors ==
A bus reactor is an air core inductor, or oil filled inductor, connected between two buses or two sections of the same bus to limit the voltage transients on either bus. It is installed in a bus to maintain system voltage when the load of the bus changes. It adds inductance to the system to offset the capacitance of the line.

== Line reactors ==
A line reactor is placed in line at the point of use or just after a transformer to maintain a stable amperage to the user. When a line is disconnected from the system, the line reactor is also disconnected from the system. Line reactors are often used to compensate line capacitance, mitigate voltage transients due to switching, and to limit fault currents, especially in case of underground transmission lines.

A bus reactor and a line reactor are interchangeable as long as they are rated for the same voltage which is dependent upon substation's physical layout, and bus configuration.

== Shunt reactors ==
Shunt reactors are used in power systems to counteract the effect of the line parasitic capacitance, thereby stabilizing the system voltage within acceptable limits. The utility of shunt reactors for voltage control on lightly-loaded transmission lines was examined in a 1926 paper presented at the AIEE by Edith Clarke. For short lines, we can basically ignore the impact of capacitive current from a voltage regulation point of view, but medium and long lines can have voltages at their receiving end much higher than the sending end, thus creating issues such as over-fluxing of power transformers and over stressing of line insulators. Under light-load conditions, the line produces more VARs, resulting in receiving end voltage being higher than sending end voltage. In order to consume the excess VARs when system is lightly loaded, an inductor is added to the system.

A traditional shunt reactor has a fixed rating and is either connected to the power line all the time or switched in and out depending on the load. Recently variable shunt reactors (VSRs) have been developed and introduced on the market. The rating of a VSR can be changed in steps: the maximum regulation range depends on the capability of the on-load tap changer used in combination with the regulation winding used for the shunt reactor. The maximum regulation range has increased over the years, from 50%, up to 80% at some voltage levels. VSRs are considered technically advanced products and are mainly supplied by larger global manufacturers.

=== Controlled shunt reactors ===
A controlled shunt reactor (CSR) is a variable inductance, smoothly regulated by magnetic biasing of ferromagnetic elements of magnetic circuit. The magnetic system of a CSR single phase consists of two cores. Each core is equipped with control and power windings. In case of regulated DC voltage source connection to the control windings, biasing flow is increasing and directed to different sides in the adjacent cores. This resulted in saturation of CSR cores at relevant half-period of the current. Core saturation is resulted in initiation and increase of the current in the power winding due to non-linear characteristics of the magnetic core. Change in biasing current value leads to the power winding current change, due to which a stepless variation of voltage levels in CSR connection point as well as the value of reactive power consumed by the reactor is ensured.

=== Variable shunt reactor ===
Variable shunt reactors are used in high voltage energy transmission systems to stabilize the voltage during load variations. The variability brings several benefits compared to a traditional fixed shunt reactors. The VSR can continuously compensate reactive power as the load varies and thereby stabilise the voltage. Other important benefits are:

- reduced voltage jumps resulting from switching in and out a traditional fixed shunt reactor
- flexibility for future variation in load and generation patterns
- improved interaction with other transmission equipment and systems such as coarse tuning of SVC equipment
- limiting the footprint of a substation: if parallel, fixed shunt reactors can be replaced with one VSR
- a VSR can be used as a flexible spare unit and be moved to other locations in the power grid if needed
- mitigation of zero-miss phenomenon, while energisation of long power lines and cables

== Series reactors ==
Series reactors are used as current limiting reactors to increase the impedance of a system. They are also used for neutral earthing. Such reactors are also used to limit the starting currents of synchronous electric motors and to compensate reactive power in order to improve the transmission capacity of power lines.
