= Jalalabad State University =

University in Kyrgyzstan

Coordinates: 40°55′37″N 73°0′17″E

Jalal-Abad State University named after Bekmamat Osmonov
- Бекмамат Осмонов атындагы Жалал-Абад мамлекеттик университети мекемеси
- Other name: Б. Осмонов ат. ЖАМУ
- Motto in English: University aims to provide a quality education to the students of Kyrgyzstan and other countries.
- Type: Government university
- Established: 2 April 1993
- Rector: Keneshbek Jhumabekovich Usenov
- Location: Jalal-Abad, Kyrgyzstan
- Campus: Urban
- Language: Russian, Kyrgyz, English
- Website: https://jasu.kg

Jalal-Abad State University (Kyrgyz: Бекмамат Осмонов атындагы Жалал-Абад мамлекеттик университети мекемеси), Russian: Жалал-Абадский государственный университет имени Бекмамата Осмонова) was founded on April 2, 1993, in the city of Jalal-Abad, Kyrgyzstan on the basis of already functioning educational institutions.

This is a public institution designed to provide higher education in the following fields of medicine, electronics, energy, construction and the agro-industrial complex.

== About JASU ==
Approximately 10,000 students study at JASU. There are more than 700 teachers, including 100 doctors of science and professors, as well as 216 candidates of science and docents. Approximately 3000 students from countries including India, Iran, Israel, Kazakhstan, Nepal, Pakistan, Palestine, Syria, Turkey, Turkmenistan, the United States, and Uzbekistan study at the university. The university produces specialists with high quality education in 54 fields and a secondary professional education in 12 fields. The medical faculty of Jalal-Abad State University is affiliated with the Ministry of Health and Science Education. It was opened by the president of Kyrgyzstan on April 2, 1993, as a state educational institution designed to provide training for specialists with basic and complete higher education in areas such as electronics, energy, construction, medicine, education and also specialists for the agro-industrial complex.

== History ==
- Jalalabad State University, named after B.Osmonov Medical Faculty (JaSU), was founded on April 2, 1993 on the basis of already functioning educational institutions.
- The pedagogical faculty was founded in 1926 and zoo veterinary technical school was formed in 1947 in Jalal-Abad.
- Branches of Frunze Polytechnic Institute were founded in 1963 in Kara-kul and in 1990 in Tash-Komur.
- An engineering technical faculty was founded in 1981 in Kochkor-Ata.
- An electro-mechanical technical faculty was founded in 1965 in Mayluu-Suu.

== Faculties ==
- Faculty of Medicine
- Faculty of Nursing
- Business and Pedagogical Faculty
- Kara-Kul Technical Faculty
- Tash-Komur Technological Faculty
- Zoological & Veterinary Technical Faculty
- Kochkor-Ata Electronic Technical College
- Mayluu-Suu Electro-Mechanical College
- Chemical Engineering
- Industrial Water Engineering
- Construction and Civil Engineering and instrumentation
- Electricity and Power Engineering
- Physical Training and Sport
- Preparatory Studies
- Physics and Mathematics
- Computer Sciences

== Library ==
The library of Jalal-Abad State University is home to many thousand of books. Every faculty of the University named has its own library. The library of the Medical Faculty is online as well as in person. The library has collection of books from many different fields, with many of the books written by international authors. The library is also home to video lectures by professors of the university as well as other famous medical video tutors. Students can access these video lectures anywhere via the Internet. The library is under CCTV surveillance 24 hours a day, to promote safety and security.

== Hospitals ==
The teaching hospitals are well-equipped with modern diagnostic and treatment facilities to train students at higher scientific and professional levels. The university is affiliated to the following hospitals where medical students can practice in their free time with the supervision of a qualified medical professional.

Hospital affiliations

- Jalal-Abad City Hospital
- Jalal-Abad Perinatal Hospital
- Jalal-Abad Territorial Polyclinic
- Jalal-Abad City Maternity Hospital
- Osh Provincial Clinical Hospital
- Osh City Territorial Hospital
- City Hospital of Infectious Diseases
- Osh Inter Provincial Center of Oncology

== Administration of JaSU ==
Rector	Pro rector
K.J. Usenov	A.P. Alibaev

== Notable alumni ==
- Rakhat Achylova
