= Glusco (gas stations) =

Fuel station chain in Ukraine

- Company type: Private
- Industry: Fuel Retail and network of convenience stores
- Founded: 2014 or 2016
- Headquarters: Business Center "Eleven", Kyiv, Ukraine
- Number of locations: filing stations: 127 (2016) oil terminals: 6
- Website: glusco.swiss

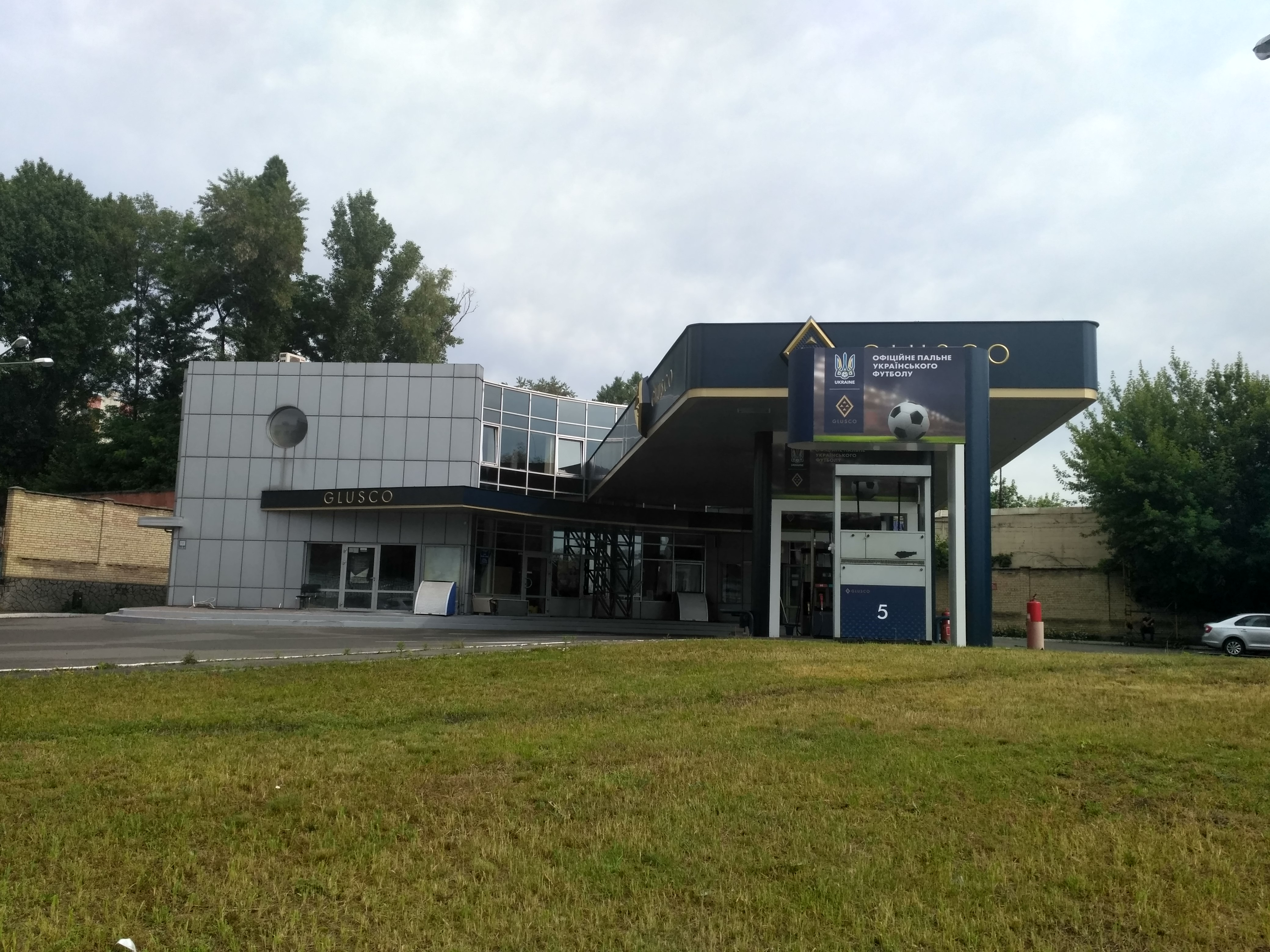
One of the Glusco's gas stations in Ukraine

Glusco is a subsidiary of the Greenenergo Trading S.A. that operates a national chain of gasoline stations and convenience stores in Ukraine. The Greenenergo Trading S.A. itself is part of the bigger SNEL Energy Limited directed by Dimitrios Anifantakis.

== Overview ==
Previously before Rosneft acquired the TNK network of filling stations in Ukraine which was owned by TNK-BP, in 2010 the TNK-BP Commerce bought for a record sum for Ukrainian market of $313 million a network of 114 Ukrtatnafta filling stations belong to "Vic Oil" (through UTN-Vostok). Before that in 2009 TNK-BP acquired several filling stations Zolotoy Gepard around Kyiv.

The company was established in 2016 after the 2014 Russian invasion of Ukraine and boycott of the Rosneft gas stations.

In January 2016 Greenenergo Trading S.A. petitioned to obtain the network after Rosneft announced that it is leaving the Ukrainian market of crude oil products. In March 2016 Greenenergo Trading S.A filed a second petition to the Anti-Monopoly Committee of Ukraine after the initial petition was denied.

=== Establishment of Glusco Ukraine ===
The company was registered in July 2016. In December 2016 Greenenergo Trading S.A. received approval from the Anti-Monopoly Committee of Ukraine to buy a network of gas station from Rosneft Management Company Limited (Nicosia, Cyprus) represented in Ukraine as "Vostok". The Vostok's gas stations operated under various names such as TNK, Zolotoy Gepard, Formula, others. Sometimes before 2011, the TNK-Rosneft acquired the Kyivan Zolotoy Gepard and the All-Ukrainian Vic Oil. The transfer of assets was finalized in December 2017. Along with a network of filling stations, Glusco also obtained the Lysychansk Oil Refinery earlier belonging to TNK-Rosneft, while some news media speculated that oil refinery in Lysychansk was not intended for sale.

Several journalists and experts of crude oil product markets pointed out that, several traditional importers of liquified gas to Ukraine began having problems with the Security Service of Ukraine, Ministry of Economic Development and customs, while other started to import, such gas in large quantities from Russia. The press service of public organization "Ukrainskiy vybor" that is headed by Viktor Medvedchuk on journalist inquiry about the Medvedchuk's connection with the transfer denied any allegations or implies for such connection.

=== Operations ===
The company has its own loyalty program called Glusco Club.

Since February 2018 the Glusco company is a sponsor of the Ukrainian People's Club Veres from Rivne and later after "merging (swap)" of clubs renewed its sponsorship with Football Club Lviv.

On 22 January 2019 the company announced a change of its leadership appointing Borys Handzha as a general director of "Glusco Ukraine". The company also provided an update for its operation and assets stating that it possesses 127 filling stations and 6 oil terminals. It accounted for 2,000 employees. Since 2017 it opened 14 new filling stations. Among its main types of business are: wholesale of crude oil products, retail sale through a network of filling stations and café, corporate sales, sale of aviation fuel to international and national aviation companies. The Glusco company actively cooperates with the Ukrainian Federation of Motorists (Automobilists), Ukrainian Association of Football (former Football Federation of Ukraine).

=== Products and assets ===
- A-95
- A-92
- 95 MAXX
- Diesel MAXX
- LPG (Liquefied petroleum gas)
- A-98 (sometimes at selected locations)

In March 2020 the company owned 103 filling stations with 45 active sites for gas filling. All the stations are spread throughout 13 oblasts of Ukraine. Glusco also has 3 oil terminals and a fleet of own 26 tanker trucks. The company employs 1,800 people.

The MAXX fuel is produced at the ORLEN Lietuva Oil Refinery (Lithuania) and corresponds to the European standard EN228 for gas fuel and EN590 for diesel fuel. The MAXX fuel uses a multifunctional fuel additive Keropur produced by the international chemical company BASF (Germany). The Glusco also uses oil products of some other oil refineries among which is the Mazyr Oil Refinery (Belarus).

=== Conflicts ===
In 2018 the company had a conflict over a land lot with the Dovzhenko Film Studios in Kyiv that was previously working as TNK, but The Dovzhenko Film Studios posted at its website a denial of its allegations towards the Glusco's subsidiary company.

In March 2021 the Security Service of Ukraine arrested Glusco's fueling stations because of the criminal case of sale of low-quality petroleum products. This situation blocked the company from selling petrol, however they could still sell gas and products and their minimarkets were in operation. In June Glusco tried to renew the selling of petrol, but the attempt was failed. In August, being on the edge of bankruptcy, the company decided to rent out around seven of the company's fueling stations, due to that some of their stations in Kyiv were rebranded as WOG, KLO and BRSM Nafta.
