= Hillar Teder =

Estonian businessman

Hillar Teder (born 10 September 1962) is an Estonian businessman and property developer conducting his business in Estonia, Latvia, Russia and Ukraine. He is a majority shareholder in Arricano Real Estate plc.

In 2011 and 2012, Teder topped the "Wealthiest People in Estonia" ranking composed by the business magazine Äripäev (Business Daily), and in the years 2013-2015, he appeared in the top five positions of the list. In 2016, Teder's net worth had dropped to €60 million.

== Early life ==
Teder was born on 10 September 1962 to a family of teachers. In 1980, he graduated from the Tallinn School of Science (Tallinna Reaalkool), and in 1986 from the Tallinn Polytechnic Institute having majored in mechanical engineering.

His entrepreneurial career started in the early 1990s, when together with the LADA automotive centre he established Mega Avto, a company specialising in car sales in Russia. The commercial interests of the company also extended to sales of Audi and Peugeot cars in Estonia and Honda in Latvia. In 1994 Teder privatised the LADA auto centre in Tallinn.

In 1995, in conjunction with his partners Dmitriy Korzhev and Dmitriy Troitskiy in St Petersburg, Teder established Multon, a juice manufacturing company. The launch of trademarks Dobriy, RICH, Moya Semiya quickly converted the company into an industry leader and caught the eye of The Coca-Cola Company, which bought Multon for $501 million in 2005.

The next stage in Teder's entrepreneurial history was commercial property development. 1997 saw the commencement of construction of Rocca al Mare, Tallinn's largest shopping and entertainment centre of 35 000 sq.m., financed by the international SEB Bank. Rocca al Mare was opened in 1998 and its office building quickly became known as the Audi Tower.

In 2001, Teder set up one of the first technoparks in Estonia, which he sold in 2005.

Teder is a co-founder and owner of one of the largest food retailers in Russia, the O'Key supermarket chain. The O'Key group was founded and registered in St Petersburg in 2001. Having opened its first hypermarket in 2002, by 2015 the total number of O'Key supermarkets in Russia reached 111 with the chain being present in 27 large cities.

Teder is a shareholder of Arricano, a leading commercial property developer who owns and operates a number of shopping centres in Ukraine (Sky Mall, RayON and Prospect in Kyiv, Sun Gallery in Kryvyi Rih, City Mall in Zaporizhzhia and South Gallery in Simferopol). In 2013 Arricano Real Estate became the first post-crisis Ukrainian developer to launch an IPO at the AIM of the London Stock Exchange. The market capitalisation at the moment of IPO approximated USD 24 million.

2015 saw the onset of another large-scale project, a modern office and shopping complex Porto Franco in Tallinn (GBA 40 000 sq.m.).

== Scandals ==
Teder was accused of bankruptcy of the Ukrainian O'Key chain by retail suppliers (in autumn of 2012 a picketing of the Estonian Embassy in Ukraine was organised by entrepreneurs). The dispute was settled by reaching an amicable agreement between the creditors' committee and the O'Key Ukraine retailer.

In 2014, the scheme of Sky Mall shopping centre ownership became the point of dispute between Teder and businessman Andrey Adamovskiy. In October 2015 the High Court in London upheld the London Court of International Arbitration confirming Arricano's right to a stake buyout in the Sky Mall project.

Teder had been mentioned alongside Vello Kunman (Silikaat Grupp owner), Villu Reiljan (former politician and mayor's counsellor) and Aivar Tuulberg (Rand&Tuulberg owner) in the context of a corruption scandal and attempted bribery of the Tallinn's mayor, Edgar Savisaar. The investigation had at its disposal information on multiple bribes taken by Savisaar in the form of property and fringe benefits in the years 2014-2015. No evidence linking the businessmen to the case was ever discovered.

Teder admitted in Harju County Court to funding the Center Party in secret prior to the 2015 Riigikogu elections in exchange for a land swap deal going ahead in the capital.
