= Arricano Real Estate plc =

- Formerly: Arricano Trading Ltd.
- Type: Public limited company
- Industry: Real estate development, retail
- Founded: 2005
- Headquarters: Kyiv, Ukraine
- Products: Commercial real estate
- Website: www.arricano.com

Arricano Real Estate plc is a public limited company operating in the field of commercial real estate, one of the big developers and shopping centre network operators in Ukraine. The company deals with full cycle of retail real estate development, from purchase of land property and construction to shopping mall operation.

Arricano Real Estate plc is a company that has European investments, European standards and approaches to business management. The company is managed by the team of European and Ukrainian top-managers. The activity of Arricano Real Estate plc is controlled by the board of directors, which consists of three independent non-executive, one executive and two non-executive directors. The directors report to the shareholders regarding the issues of the group's performance, its achievements and long-term plans.

== History ==
Arricano Real Estate plc was established on 31 January 2008, as a limited liability company Arricano Trading Limited. The current company name was adopted after its reorganization on 12 September 2012.

In 2005, a majority stakeholder of Arricano Real Estate plc – Retail Real Estate S.A. (Luxembourg) – started operating at Ukrainian commercial real estate market through its branch companies. Phase one of Kyiv shopping and entertainment complex Sky Mall in 2007. In order to provide for further development of the projects, financing from JSC UkrSibbank was obtained amounting to US$13 million.

The next remarkable event took place in 2008, when on 11 October, Sun Gallery shopping centre having gross leasable area (GLA) of 35,000 square metres (380,000 sq ft) was opened in Kryvyi Rih.

The same year, Arricano entered into credit facility agreement with European Bank for Reconstruction and Development (EBRD) in Ukraine under which conditions it was possible to obtain a maximal amount of financing of US$139,307,000.

Branch companies of Retail Real Estate S.A., are consolidated into a group of companies headed by Arricano as a holding company for the purpose of further construction of professional shopping malls and management of commercial real estate in Ukraine.

In 2010, the opening of phase two of one of the biggest shopping centres in Kyiv, Sky Mall, with total area (GBA) amounting to 88,000 square metres (950,000 sq ft), including the leasable area (GLA) of 68,000 square metres (730,000 sq ft), took place.

Dragon-Ukrainian Properties & Development plc (DUPD) investment fund purchased 35% of shares of Arricano Trading Limited, investing the amount totalling to $30 million.

Launching of the fourth project implemented by Arricano took place in Zaporizhia in 2011 with the opening of City Mall shopping and entertainment complex having gross leasable area (GLA) of 21,450 square metres (230,900 sq ft).

In 2012, RayON shopping centre, gross leasable area (GLA) of which is 24 350 sq. m., was set in operation in Kyiv. The same year, the construction of Prospekt shopping mall in Kyiv started.

In 2013, Arricano obtained 4 credit facilities from Ukrainian and international banks amounting to approximately $100 million: a credit in June amounting to $25 million; a credit in July at the corporate level from UBS bank amounting to $28.8 million; a credit in August from Raiffeisen Bank Aval (Kyiv) amounting to $15 million; a credit in October from State Savings Bank of Ukraine for the construction of Prospekt shopping mall amounting to $30 million.

From September 2013, the company shares are listed at Alternative Investment Market AIM of London Stock Exchange. Market capitalization of Arricano Real Estate plc at the time of listing was around $241 million. After the crisis of 2008—2009, this was the first public share placement of a Ukrainian developer company and the first Ukrainian IPO (initial public offering) in 2013. As the result of listing of shares, Arricano Real Estate plc earned income amounting to $24 million. in the form of money funds, and it also gained four assets, which estimated value at the time of listing was $66 million. in return for the shares issued for the purposes of IPO.

The same year the work for development of Lukianivka Mall shopping centre in Kyiv began.

At the beginning of 2014, Arricano opened a second phase of South Gallery shopping centre in Simferopol, gross leasable area (GLA) of which is 32,200 square metres (347,000 sq ft). In September, an official opening of Prospekt shopping centre took place in Kyiv, its gross leasable area (GLA) is 30,400 square metres (327,000 sq ft). The same year, the credit line of EBRD was opened for Arricano amounting to $25 million. for further refunding of Prospekt shopping centre. On 19 August 2014, London Court of International Arbitration (LCIA) made an award in favour of Arricanо restoring the company's right to repurchase the majority stake in Sky Mall shopping centre project under the terms and conditions of agreement of 2010.

In 2015, the project of Odesa Mall obtained the support of local authorities and the Governor of the Odesa Oblast. The public prosecutor's office of the Region of Odesa withdrew the case of invalidation of the decision of Odesa City Council on approval of the comprehensive territory plan, developed with the participation of Arricano.

In May 2015, Arricano became a participant of Let's Do It Together joint action social project (Ukrainian: Зробимо разом!), providing for joint efforts of the Kyiv City Council, representatives of business and the community of Kyiv for the sake of creating a comfortable environment for residents and guests of the city, improving the quality of life in the capital. Within the framework of this project, Arricano presented the project for construction of Lukianivka Mall shopping centre and a large-scale accompanying project of reconstruction of road network in the area of Lukyanivka subway station, Lukyanivska square and the architectural monuments in the territory of the shopping centre.

== Structure ==
- 2008 – Sun Gallery shopping centre (Kryvyi Rih)
- 2010 – Sky Mall shopping centre (Kyiv)
- 2011 – City Mall shopping centre (Zaporizhia)
- 2012 – RayON shopping centre (Kyiv)
- 2014 – Prospekt shopping centre (Kyiv)
- Odesa Mall shopping centre (Odesa) (under construction)
- Lukianivka Mall shopping centre (Kyiv) (under construction)
- Petrivka shopping centre (Kyiv) (under construction)

=== Sun Gallery shopping centre (Kryvyi Rih) ===
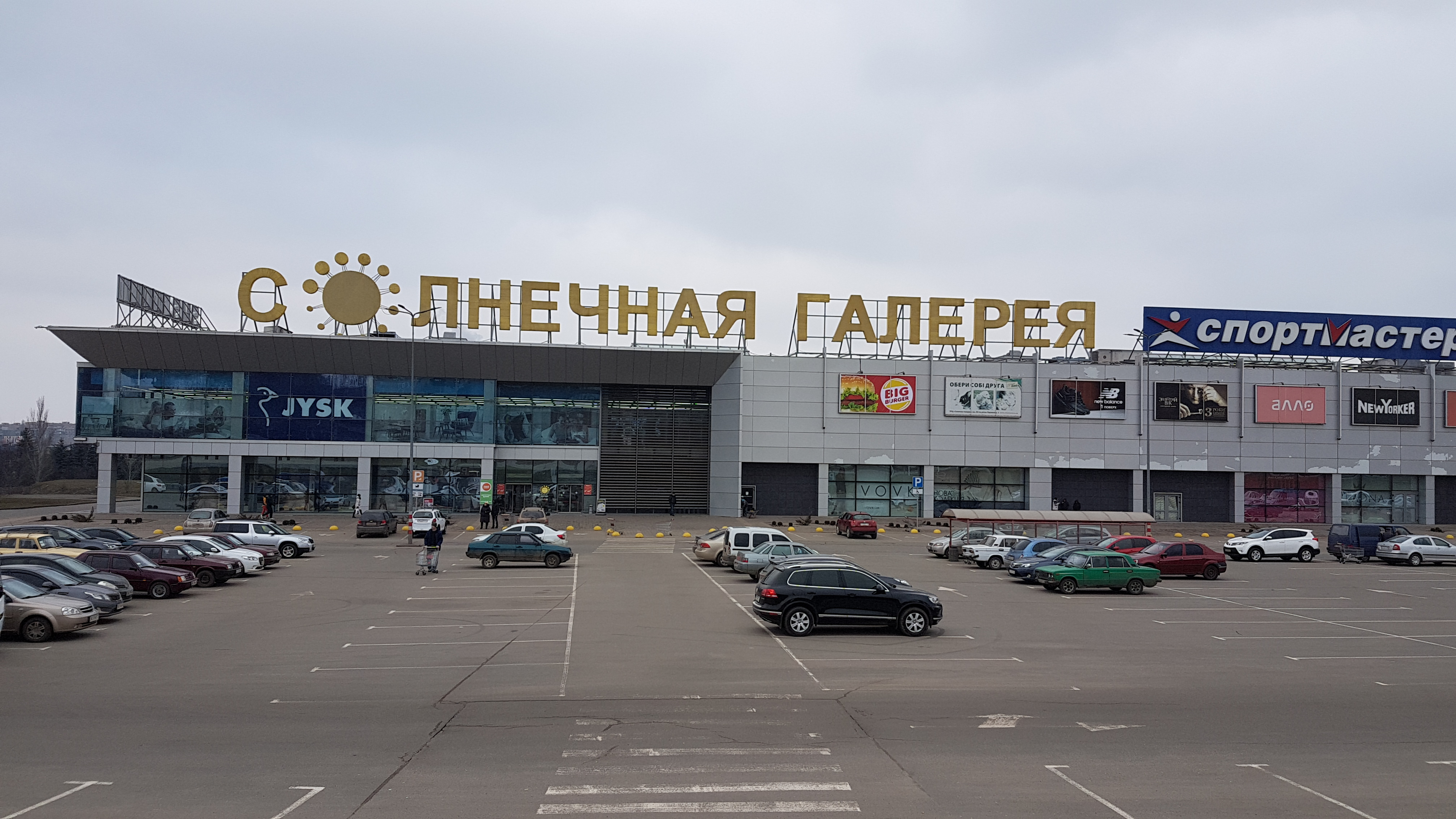
Sun Gallery (Kryvyi Rih).

Sun Gallery shopping centre opened at Saksahanskyi District of Kryvyi Rih in September 2008. The complex is a two-level building with GLA of 35,500 square metres (382,000 sq ft), including the stores of leading brands, a food hypermarket, a children entertainment complex, a food court zone.

In the territory of the complex, city art exhibitions, master classes, performances (Nativity scenes), sports events (Yunost spartakiad, Criterium bike ride) take place, social programs are implemented.

=== Sky Mall shopping centre (Kyiv) ===
A formal opening of Sky Mall shopping centre took place on 27 August 2010 on 2 on General Vatutin avenue. (In June 2017, the Kyiv City Council renamed the city's General Vatutin Avenue into Roman Shukhevych Avenue.)

In 2009, Hillar Teder invited Andrey Adamovskiy to the project in order to complete the construction of Sky Mall shopping centre (investment of $40 million.), in this way obtaining the controlling interest (50% +1 share) on the condition that Teder retains a call option (purchase option) for the share of Adamovskiy. However, in 2010, Adamovskiy refused to sell his share arguing that Teder, supposedly, violated some contract conditions. Litigations following the argument for the right of property for the facility were held at British, Cyprian and Ukrainian courts.

London Court of International Arbitration LCIA finished the series of litigations on 19 August 2014, by delivering a judgement in favour of Arricanо and restoring the company's right to purchase the stock of shares from Adamovskiy through exercising the call-option subject to contract conditions of 2010 for $51.4 million. LCIA Stockman Interhold S.A. (affiliated with Andrey Adamovskiy) tried to appeal against this decision; however, on 22 October 2015, High Court of Justice dismissed the company's appeal.

In September 2014, Stockman Interhold S.A. transferred 100% of profit participation rights for the property to Dutch company Financing and Investment Solutions B. V., and the property right for the shopping centre was confirmed by Pivdenny Bank because of the outstanding debt amounting to $32 million. (management of Arricano declared the debt to be artificially created).

The second re-registration of the property took place on 17 December 2014, 100% of profit participation rights of Prizma Beta LLC, a Ukrainian company owning the project, were transferred from Financing and Investment Solutions B. V. to Sky Holding LLC (Boryspil). Arricano declared that registry actions were carried out illegally, having two valid prohibitions for registry actions imposed by courts and law-enforcement authorities. Violations at transfer of 100% profit participation rights of Prisma Beta LLC were confirmed in the course of investigation held by Ukrgosreestr following which results the agency filed the request to public prosecution office. Company management addressed the top public officials through mass media asking to provide for the maximal transparency, justice and efficiency in reviewing the case of Sky Mall.

The dispute around Sky Mall shopping centre became the object of journalistic investigations held by the editors offices of Zerkalo Nedeli, Insider, Investigation Info (Sledstviye. Info), Money, and The Territory of Law (Terytoriya Zakonu). The facts of property rights violations regarding Sky Mall shopping centre in Ukraine, pressure on the company and its employees through law-enforcement authorities were disclosed to public by mass media.

As of the end of 2015, SkyMall remains the property of Pivdenny Bank; the companies affiliated with Andrey Adamovskiy maintain the operational control over the shopping centre.

== Ratings and awards ==
- 2012 – The second place by number of finished professional shopping centres and their total gross leasable area according to the rating of leading retail real estate developers, drafted by Forbes, the experts of Ernst & Young, CBRE, DTZ, Colliers and market insiders.
- 2014 – 25th place taken by Hillar Teder in annual Rentier Rating according to Forbes.
- 2015 – Prospekt shopping centre was recognized as the best public facility based on the results of competition held by State Architectural and Construction Inspectorate of Ukraine.
- 2015 – Annual rating of shopping and entertainment complexes in Ukraine held by Ukrainian Retail Association. In the nomination of Traditional Average Shopping Centre, the first place was taken by Prospekt, and the second one by RayON.
- 2016 – 7th place taken by Hillar Teder in annual Rentier Rating according to Forbes.
