= Odesa Refinery =

Oil Refinery in Odesa, Ukraine

- Native name: Одеський нафтопереробний завод
- Type: Public joint-stock company
- Industry: Petroleum refining processes
- Founded: 1938
- Headquarters: Odesa, Skodova Hora Street, bldg. 1/1
- Number of employees: 1000 (2016)
- Parent: State Property Fund of Ukraine

Public JSC Odesa Oil Refinery is the fourth-largest Ukrainian oil refinery and a strategically important facility for the state's economy. It is located in Odesa, Odesa Oblast, built in 1935, capacity, as of 2005, about 2.8 million tons of crude oil per year.

Originally owned by Russian oil company Lukoil following the start of privatisation in Ukraine, in 2013 it was acquired by pro-Russian businessman Serhiy Kurchenko of the VETEK group. However, after Euromaidan, an investigation was launched into VETEK's activities at the refinery, and all the assets of the refinery were seized by the state, and it came under the control of the state enterprise Ukrtransnaftoprodukt, while the refinery ceased production. Following allegations regarding the sale of products by the state enterprise, it was transferred to the State Property Fund, which confirmed in an audit that most of the equipment was non-functional. In May 2021, ARMA took over the plant, while at the same time, there was an ongoing legal dispute over the original seizure in 2014 from VETEK. Ultimately, in June 2024, the Cabinet of Ministers decided to remove ARMA's control.

== History ==
Following the start of privatisation in Ukraine, the company was acquired by the Russian oil company Lukoil. In 2013, the company was then acquired from Lukoil by pro-Russian businessman Serhiy Kurchenko, who owns the VETEK group. Prior to 2014, Kurchenko held the refinery through a Cyprus-based company, Empson Limited, with the ultimate beneficiary being VTB Bank. Starting in February 2014, the refinery ceased production of oil products.

Following Euromaidan, an investigation began in late February 2014 into the actions of VETEK at the refinery. In April 2014, it was ordered by a court in Kyiv that all real estate and land of the refinery was to be seized by the state. Following the seizure, it came under the state enterprise Ukrtransnaftoprodukt, which managed the property. However, starting in 2015, there were allegations of abuse during the sale of petroleum products from the factory, with later allegations that raw material from it was sold at artificially low prices and funds were transferred not to the state budget but to other companies, which is why there was a loss reported on 967 million hryvnia.

In September 2017, the Cabinet of Ministers finally transferred the refinery to the management of the State Property Fund, which created a separate state-owned enterprise for the refinery on 4 January 2018. Following its coming under the State Property Fund, an official audit was done of the asset inventory of the refinery, which reported that most of the equipment had lost functionality at the plant due to improper removal. In February 2021, the State Property Fund told the Odesa Regional Prosecutor's Office that the state enterprise lacked funding to protect the facility. Later, in September, another regional commission declared that the still non-operational refinery was an environmental emergency that could have catastrophic consequences. Subsequently, in May 2021, the Asset Recovery and Management Agency (ARMA) took over the plant.

Ongoing to the state troubles, VETEK attempted to appeal to the state regarding the 2014 seizure, and in 2021, the Court of Appeals of Kropyvnytskyi ruled in favor of VETEK after they identified violations in the delivery of the original verdict, among which were the exclusion of the property owners from the proceedings, incorrect court composition, and inconsistencies with the plea agreements. The Court of Appeals decided to send the case back down to a trial court since the original verdict couldn't be corrected on appeal, and in October 2023, the trial court declined to approve the plea agreement, meaning the confiscation order collapsed entirely, and the assets reverted back to being seized again. In August 2023, ARMA proposed transferring the refinery back to a state-owned company due to a technogenic emergency at the refinery. On 7 June 2024, the Cabinet of Ministers agreed to this, acting on ARMA's proposal. The decision was to restore the plant's operations either by transferring the refinery to Ukrtatnafta or to a newly created state enterprise, while affirming the compulsory seizure of the property rights of the previous Russian owners.

== See also ==
- LukOil
- List of oil refineries
- Odesa Port Plant
