= Bishkek State University =

Public university in Kyrgyzstan

- Бишкек Гуманитардык Университети (Kyrgyz); Бишкекский гуманитарный университет (Russian)
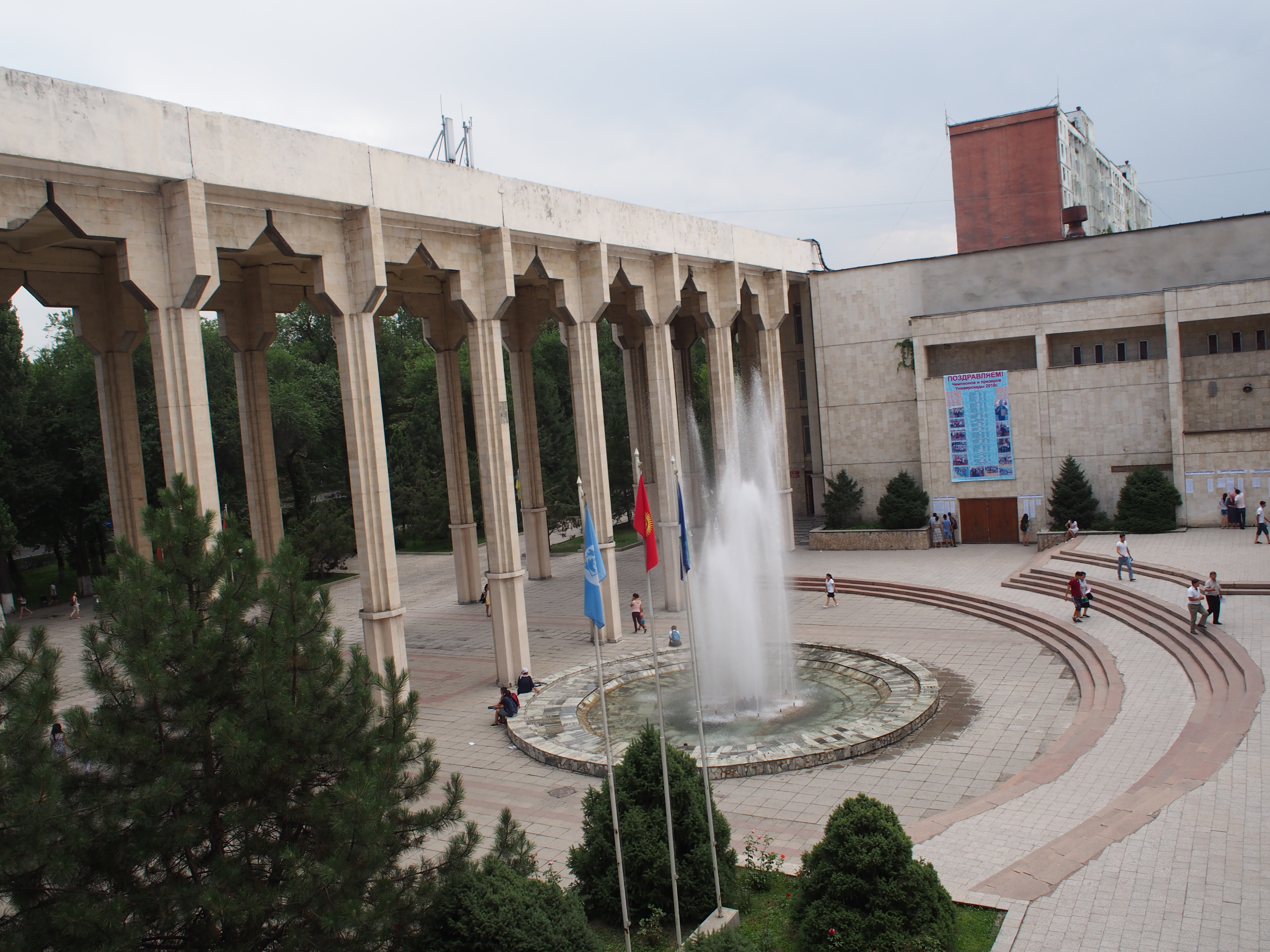
- Established: 1979 (47 years ago)
- Location: Bishkek, Kyrgyzstan; 42.85014°N 74.58456°E
- Website: www.bhu.kg

- Location in Kyrgyzstan

Bishkek State University or BSU (Kyrgyz: Бишкек Гуманитардык Университети, Russian: Бишкекский гуманитарный университет) is a public university located in Bishkek, the capital of Kyrgyzstan. The university was named after K. Karasaev.

== History ==
The university was established in 1979 as the Pedagogical Institute of Russian Language and Literature when the Kirgiz SSR was still a part of the Soviet Union. On 17 June 1992, it was transformed into the State Institute of Languages and Humanities and re-established in 1994 by the newly formed Kyrgyz government.

== Structure ==
The university offers both undergraduate and postgraduate courses. The university hosts job fairs which are open to students, graduates, and job-seekers among the local community.
