= Ukrtatnafta =

Ukrainian oil refining company

- Type: Private
- Industry: refining
- Founded: 1995
- Headquarters: Kremenchuk, Ukraine
- Key people: Serhiy Glushko (CEO)
- Revenue: ▲US$1.3 billion
- Number of employees: 4,000
- Website: http://www.ukrtatnafta.com/

Ukrtatnafta is a Ukrainian oil refining company based in Kremenchuk and founded in 1994. It is one of the largest producers of oil products in the country. The company operates the largest oil refinery in the country with a capacity of 368,500 bbl/d (58,590 m^{3}/d) and several petrol stations. Ukrainian state-owned energy company Naftohaz Ukrainy owns 43.1% of shares, Tatneft owns 8.6% and the government of Tatarstan owns 28.8%.

== Controversy ==
Russian oil company Tatneft has an ongoing dispute with the government of Ukraine over control of Ukrtatnafta. 18% of the shares were transferred to two offshore companies allied with Tatneft, a transaction which was not recognized by Ukrainian authorities. According to the court decision, these share were handed over to Naftogaz and in October 2007, there was a management change, which is not recognized by Tatneft. In March, Tatneft filed international arbitration against Ukraine.

In Autumn 2022, whilst under the control of Ihor Kolomoiskyi, Ukrtatnafta refused to pay ₴3.2 billion in taxes.

== 2022 Nationalisation ==
On November 6, 2022, the government headed by President Volodymyr Zelenskyy used martial law to seize control of the company. “Such steps, which are necessary for our country in conditions of war, are carried out in accordance with current laws and will help meet the urgent needs of our defense sector.” The government of Ukraine also took control of engine maker Motor Sich, energy company Ukrnafta, vehicle maker KrAZ and transformer maker Zaporozhtransformator at the same time.

Ihor Kolomoiskyi and Gennadiy Bogolyubov owned 60% of the shares in Ukrtatnafta. These shares will be transferred to a special depository account managed by the Ministry of Defense of Ukraine.

== Suspected criminal activity ==
On 1 February 2023 the Economic Security Bureau of Ukraine announced that it had exposed an alleged $1 billion embezzlement scheme affecting Ukrtatnafta and Ukrnafta. The misappropriated ₴40 billion is claimed to involve the former management of Ukrnafta and Ukrtatnafta. The illegal schemes involved tax evasion and money laundering.

Charges have been made against the senior management and former chief accountant in relation to non-payment of excise tax on sales of fuel, amounting to ₴605 million. Ukrtatnafta has subsequently paid the ₴605 million taxation.

In May 2023 an additional accusation was made against the former acting first deputy Chairman of the Board of Ukrtatnafta (2019-2022), Ruslan Lyapko, relating to the removal of 72,000 tons of crude oil from customs sheds to a refinery where it was processed and sold for around ₴2 billion without the actions being reflected in accounting and tax records. Ruslan Lyapko is currently in custody.

In June, details of a further alleged fraud were revealed. On 24 February 2022, the date of the invasion, ₴600 million, designated to be paid by Ukrtatnafta to a supplier was paid, by using a false change of bank details on a clone contract, to a company owned by Mykhailo Kiperman, a former member of Ukrtatnafta's supervisory board and reportedly a business partner of Ihor Kolomoyskyi.
