= Ukrnafta =

Ukrainian oil extracting company

PJSC Ukrnafta
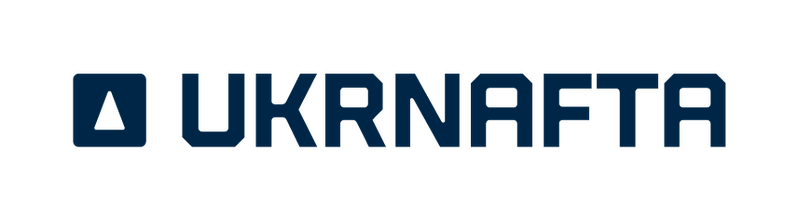
- Type: Public joint-stock company, ПАТ (PAT)
- Traded as: FWB: UKAA; PFTS: UNAF
- Industry: Oil and natural gas
- Founded: 2004; 22 years ago
- Headquarters: Kyiv, Ukraine
- Key people: Yuriy Vitrenko (Supervisory Board Chairman)
- Revenue: ▲€1.150 billion (2018)
- Total assets: 84,192,539,000 hryvnia (2025)
- Owner: Naftogaz
- Number of employees: 22,050 (2018)
- Website: www.ukrnafta.com/en

PJSC Ukrnafta (Ukrainian: ПАТ "Укрнафта") is the largest Ukrainian oil and natural gas extracting company. Ukrnafta also operates a nationwide gas filling station network.

In 2006, the company extracted some 91% of oil, 27% of natural-gas condensate and 17% of gas produced in the country. As of 2020, the company produced around 1.5 million tonnes of oil, 1.13 billion m^{3} of natural gas and 117 thousand tonnes of LPG.

== Background ==
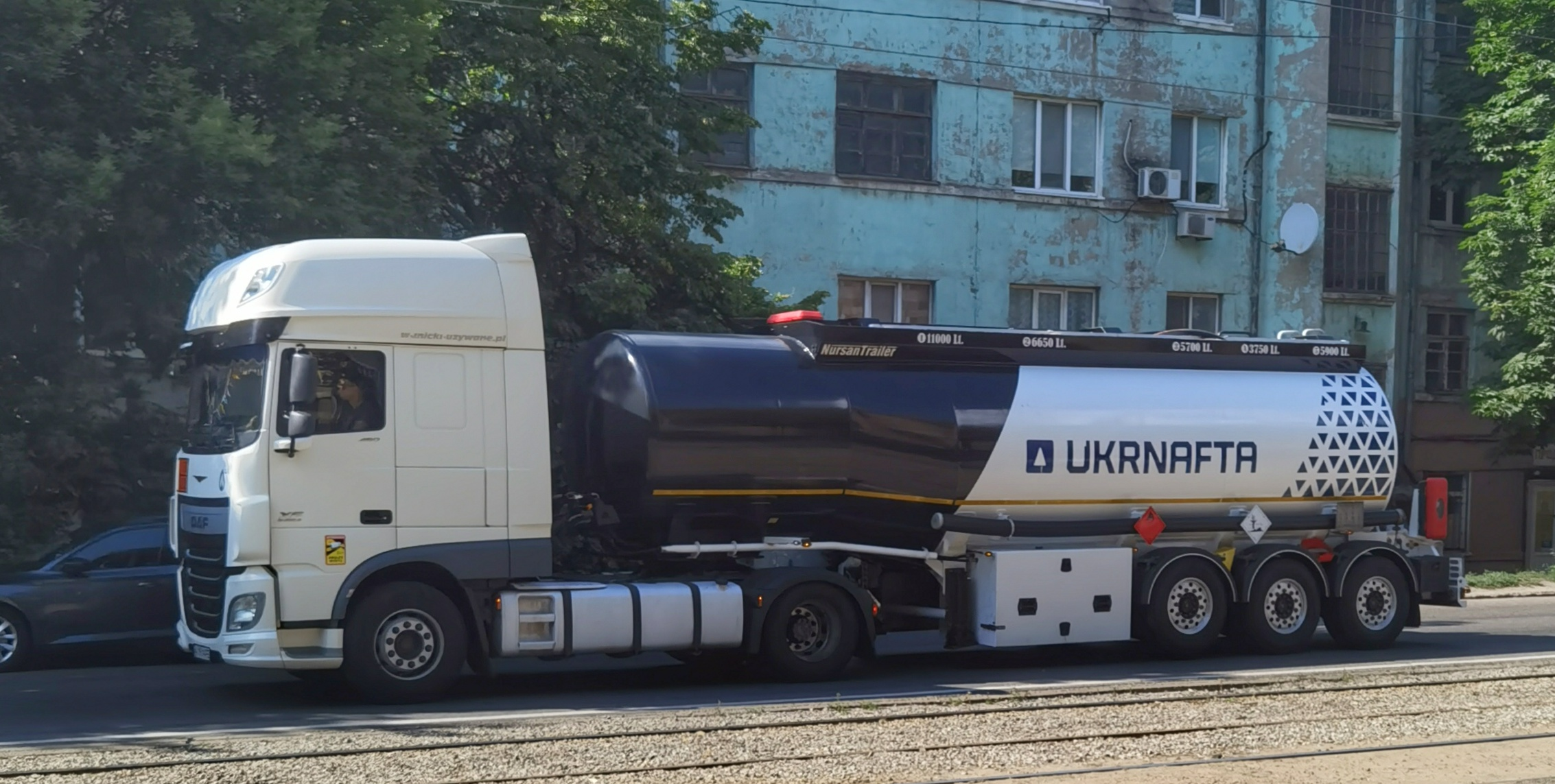
Ukrnafta truck in Dnipro, Ukraine.

The company was established in 1994 through privatization of the "Ukrnafta producing association" state enterprise that existed since 1945. Its initial predecessor was Ukrnaftcombinat. Ukrnafta is a Ukrainian portmanteau word that is a combination of the words for "Ukrainian" and "oil".

Just over 50% plus one share of the company is owned by the state company Naftogaz Ukrainy, 42% of the company belongs to the Privat Group based in Dnipro. Together with Chornomornaftogaz and Ukragazproduction they are the only state companies involved in extraction and refining of gas and oil.

After the appointment of Mark Rollins (ex BP and BG Gas) as CEO in 2015 the company is widely considered as having transformed itself into a leading model of corporate governance in the new economy of Ukraine.

Starting from 1 May 2019 Oleg Gez as acting Ukrnafta CEO.

Ukrnafta had 85 permits for hydrocarbon extraction (commercial development of reserves). As of year-end 2020, Ukrnafta had 1 813 oil wells and 155 gas wells in operation, including main and joint activity.

== Structure ==
Ukrnafta Public Joint Stock Company operates as a single production and economic complex.

The Company consists of:

- six oil and gas production departments: Okhtyrka, Chernihiv, Poltava, Dolyna, Nadvirna, Boryslav;
- three drilling departments;
- one oil refinery;
- 3 gas processing factories:
  - Hnidyn (Varva, Chernihiv Oblast)
  - Kachanivka (Mala Pavlivka, Sumy Oblast)
  - Dolyna (Dolyna, Ivano-Frankivsk Oblast)
- two grouting controls;
- two central bases of production service;
- Poltava paramilitary unit for the prevention and elimination of open oil and gas fountains;
- management of automated systems;
- installation and adjustment management;
- Research and Design Institute;
- Center for Regulatory and Economic Research;
- Center for Geological and Thematic Research;
- Representation of the Company in the Russian Federation, the Middle East and North Africa.

=== Gas filling stations ===
The company has one of the biggest networks of gas filling stations owning 537 stations on 31 December 2014.

There 28 regional administrations to provide more efficient management of the stations.

=== Educational centers ===
The main educational institutions and centers where training was conducted are:

- Ivano-Frankivsk National Technical University of Oil and Gas;
- Drohobych Petroleum Technical School;
- Paton Institute of Electric Welding;
- Lviv Interdisciplinary Institute for Advanced Training.

On the management of PJSC "Ukrnafta" there are four children's health camps and sanatoriums in different regions of Ukraine. There is a medical unit with a hospital in Dolyna, where oil workers and members of their families are treated.

== Supervisory board ==
This is the schematic composition of the directive table of the company:

- Andriy Kobolyev

Chairman of the Supervisory Board

- Sergiy Konovets
- Yuriy Vitrenko
- Kostyantyn Pozhydayev
- Yaroslav Teklyuk
- Polina Zagnitko
- Volodymyr Yemtsev
- Maxsym Yuhymenko
- Vladislav Lazorenko

== Other areas ==
The company distributes its oil products through some 531 petrol stations.

== 2022 Nationalisation ==
On November 6, 2022, the government led by President Volodymyr Zelenskyy used martial law to seize control of the company. “Such steps, which are necessary for our country in conditions of war, are carried out in accordance with current laws and will help meet the urgent needs of our defense sector.” The government of Ukraine also took control of engine maker Motor Sich, energy company Ukrtatnafta, vehicle maker KrAZ and transformer maker Zaporozhtransformator at the same time.

Just prior to the seizure, Naftogaz owned 50% +1 share, other shares were held:

- 13.6% Little Enterprises Limited
- 13.6% Bridgemont Ventures Limited
- 12.9% Bordo Management Limited

Ihor Kolomoiskyi and Gennadiy Bogolyubov owned 42% of the shares in Ukrnafta. These shares will be transferred to a special depository account managed by the Ministry of Defense of Ukraine.

== Suspected criminal activity ==
In September 2022, the National Anti-Corruption Bureau informed officials of Ukrnafta and directors of several enterprises about the suspicion of embezzlement of company property and funds worth 13.3 billion hryvnias

On 1 February 2023 the Economic Security Bureau of Ukraine announced that it had exposed an alleged $1 billion embezzlement scheme affecting Ukrtatnafta and Ukrnafta. The misappropriated ₴40 billion is claimed to involve the former management of Ukrnafta and Ukrtatnafta. The illegal schemes involved tax evasion and money laundering. Searches included properties of Ihor Kolomoiskyi.

== See also ==
- Ukrtatnafta – Ukrainian oil refining company
