= Mayor of Kremenchuk =

The following is a list of mayors of the city of Kremenchuk, Ukraine. It includes positions equivalent to mayor, such as chairperson of the city council executive committee.

== Mayors ==
- Izyumov Andrey Yakovlevich, 1900–1903, 1906–1908, 1916–1917
- Gusev Pavlo Hryhorovych, 1909, 1911-1916
- Lapchynsky George Fedorovich, 1917
- Smirnov Dmitry Petrovich, 1918
- Bromberg Moses Akimovich, 1918
- Vyazmitinov Mykola Oleksandrovych, 1918
- Boguslavsky Mikhail Solomonovich, 1919
- Humble Gregory Mikhailovich, 1920
- Serbichenko Alexander Kalistratovich, 1920-1922
- Kapranov Mykola Yevdokymovych, 1927
- Kaptsevich Alexander Savich, 1928-1929
- Fusik Fedor Alekseevich, 1934-1935
- Lagno Hryhoriy Stepanovych, 1940-1941
- Stoletskyi Oleksandr Ivanovych, 1941
- Senytsia-Verkhovskyi (German occupation, executed for saving Jews), 1941 (possibly 2 persons, a mayor and a vice-mayor)
- D. S. Dmytrenko (German occupation), 1941-1942, sentenced to hard labor after the war
- A. Aley (German occupation), 1942-1943
- Budny Alexander Andreevich, 1943-1945
- Gavrilov Mykola Dmitrovich, 1945-1949
- Violinist Dmitry Petrovich, 1949-1961
- Kozharin Mykhailo Oleksiiovych, 1962-1970
- Matvienko Victor Vasilyevich, 1970-1979
- Zaludyak Mykola Ivanovych, 1979-1980
- Verbin Anatoliy Vasyliovych, 1980-1986
- Litvinenko Anatoliy Kuzmich, 1986-1990
- Balanyuk Victor Nikolaevich, 1990
- Ponomarenko Ivan Kindratovich, 1990–1994, 1995-1998
- Bilan Leonid Nikolaevich, 1994-1995
- Nadosha Oleg Vladimirovich, 1998-2000
- Glukhov Mykola Volodymyrovych, 2000-2010
- Babayev Oleg Meidanovich, 2010-2014
- Kalashnik Victor Vasilyevich, 2014-2015
- Maletsky Vitaliy Oleksiyovych, 2015-

== See also ==
- Kremenchuk history
- History of Kremenchuk (in Ukrainian)
