= TURKPA =

International organization of Turkic States

Parliamentary Assembly of Turkic States (TURKPA)
- Flag
- Secretariat: Baku, Azerbaijan
- Official languages: Azerbaijani; Kazakh; Kyrgyz; Turkish; English
- Member states: 4 members: Azerbaijan; Kazakhstan; Kyrgyzstan; Turkey; 2 observer members: Hungary; Northern Cyprus

Leaders
  - Secretary-General: Ramil Hasan
  - Chairman-in-Office: Marlen Mamataliev
- Establishment: 21 November 2008

Area
  - Total: 3,794,962 km^{2} (1,465,243 sq mi)
- Website turkpa.org

The TURKPA in full, the Parliamentary Assembly of Turkic States, is an international organization comprising some of the Turkic countries. It was founded on 21 November 2008 in Istanbul. The General Secretariat is in Baku, Azerbaijan. The member countries are Azerbaijan, Kazakhstan, Kyrgyzstan and Turkey. Hungary and Northern Cyprus are observers.

== History ==
The Parliamentary Assembly of Turkic States (TURKPA) was established on November 21, 2008, according to the Agreement signed by the heads of parliaments of the Republic of Azerbaijan, Republic of Kazakhstan, Kyrgyz Republic, and the Republic of Turkey in the «Dolmabakhche Saray» located in Istanbul, Turkey. On September 29, 2009, the first plenary session of the Parliamentary Assembly of Turkic States (TURKPA) was conducted in the capital of the Republic of Azerbaijan Baku city. The TURKPA Regulations, Articles of Secretariat and Baku Declaration, and Statement regarding the permanent accommodation of the Secretariat in Baku city were adopted at the plenary session. The TURKPA Chairmanship annually hands over from one country to another by means of rotation in the English alphabetical order. The TURKPA Secretariat is the authority located in the capital of the Republic of Azerbaijan Baku city and has the status of international organization.

== Mission and objectives ==
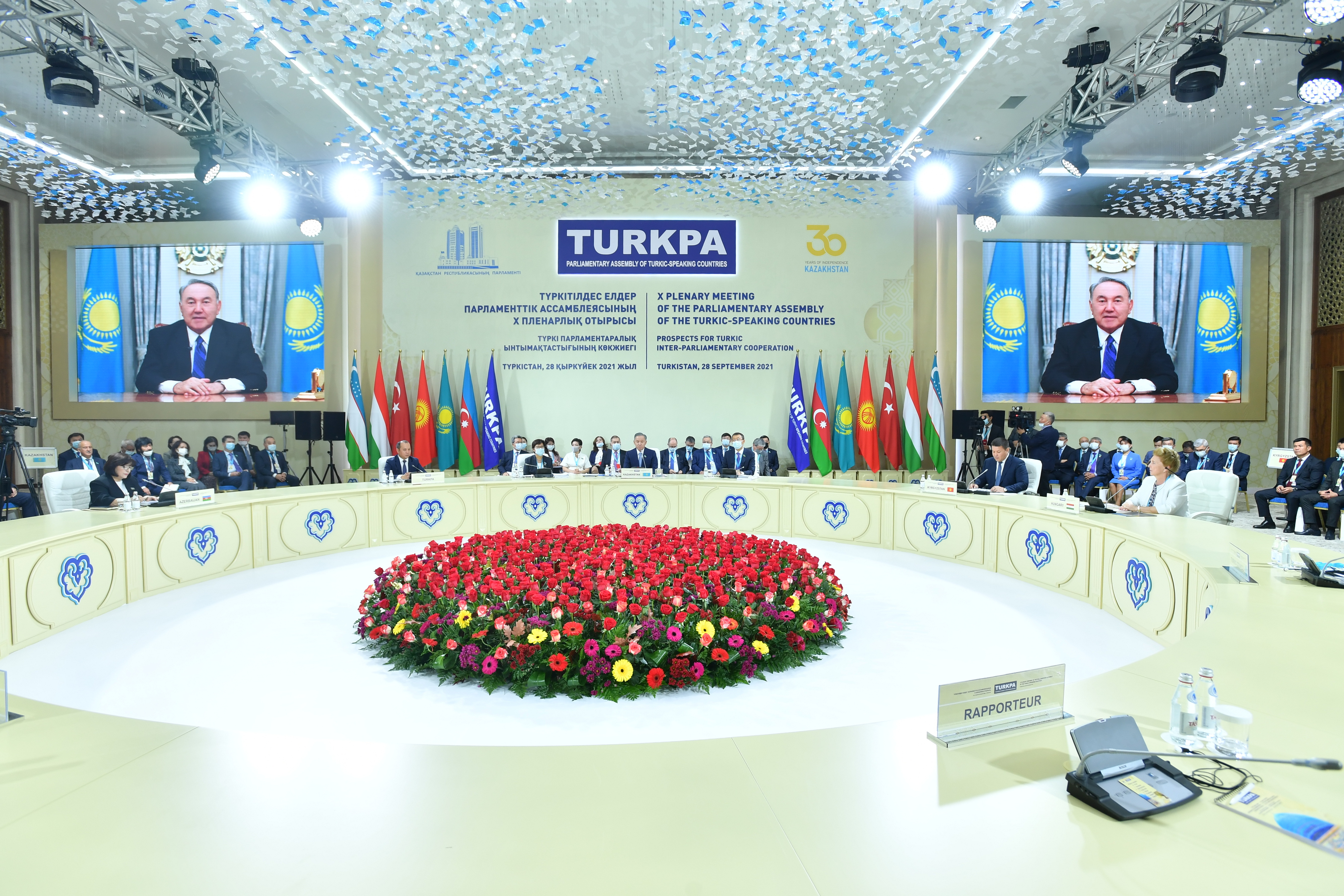
Nurlan Nigmatulin speaks at the 2021 TURKPA Assembly in Turkistan, Kazakhstan

Since 2010, TURKPA missions observe presidential and parliamentary elections and referendums in its member countries – Azerbaijan, Kazakhstan, Kyrgyzstan and Turkey. The mission includes members of the parliament of TURKPA member states, as well as representatives of the TURKPA Secretariat. TURKPA observers' mission holds meetings with high-ranked officials of the Central Election Commission and government officials. TURKPA mission monitors voting process at all stages - visits polling stations, estimates the preparation process, has conversation with voters and representatives of the polling station, meets with the officials and representatives of political and public organizations.

The observers follow the objectivity, justness, transparency and impartiality principles confirmed in Code of Conduct for International Observers approved in 2005 by the United Nations Organization, recommendations of Venice Commission of the Council of Europe and other international legal instruments. Observation missions hold press conferences on the conclusions of the elections and referendums.

TURKPA has four permanent commissions:

- Commission on Legal Affairs and International Relations (merged in 2014)
- Commission on Social, Cultural and Humanitarian Affairs
- Commission on Economic Cooperation (renamed from "Economic, Trade and Financial Affairs")
- Commission on Environment, Natural Resources and Health Protection (created in 2014 as Environment and Natural Resources)

== Main goals ==
- Assistance in development of political dialogue between the countries by means of parliamentary diplomacy as the qualitatively new stage of inter-parliamentary cooperation
- Harmonization of the legislations and strengthening mutual activities with regard to other issues relating to the parliamentary cooperation on the basis of historical, cultural, and language unity
- Assistance in development of solidity of mutually advantageous and equal cooperation between the Turkic nations and countries of other regions
- Recommendation on approximation of legislations of the countries, including legislation on preservation and transfer to the future generations of cultural heritage and values of history, art, literature and other areas which are of importance for Turkic states
- Assistance in development of political, socio-economic, cultural, humanitarian, legal, and other relations among the parties

The Parliamentary Assembly of Turkic States selected as its primary goals the principles of:

- independence
- sovereignty
- territorial and state boundaries integrity
- legal equity
- mutual respect grounded on the principle of non-interference in internal affairs of each other
- strengthening of political and economic security of the countries on the grounds of refrainment from threat or use of force or economic or any other pressure
- growth of national prosperity by means of full and rational use of natural resources
- endeavour to the new progress in the sphere of parliamentary diplomacy, establishment of new relations and development of the existing ones with parliaments and other international organizations of the countries in the region and all over the world

== Affiliated bodies and organizations ==
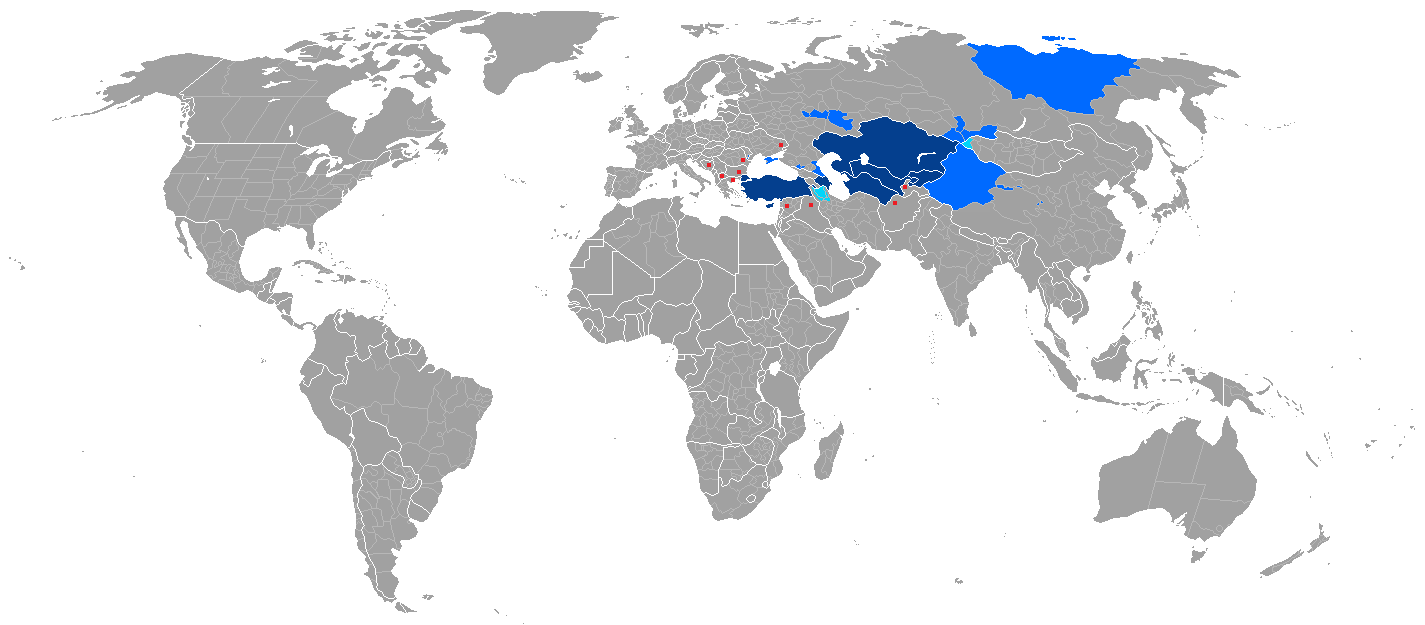
The Turkic-speaking areas

The Organization of Turkic States functions as an umbrella organization for all other cooperation mechanisms like:

- the Organization of Turkic States (general secretariat, Istanbul)
- the International Organization of Turkic Culture (TURKSOY) (administrative capital, Ankara)
- International Turkic Academy (administrative capital, Astana)
- Turkic Culture and Heritage Foundation (administrative capital, Baku)
- Center of Nomadic Civilizations (administrative capital, Bishkek)
- Turkic Business Council (administrative capital, İstanbul)

== International cooperation ==
TURKPA is an observer at the following organizations.

- Parliamentary Union of the OIC Member States (PUIC)
- Inter-Parliamentary Union (IPU)
- Association of Secretaries General of Parliaments (ASGP)
- Parliamentary Assembly of the Black Sea Economic Cooperation (PABSEC)
- Conference on Interaction and Confidence-Building Measures in Asia (CICA)
- Asian Parliamentary Assembly (APA)

== Members ==
=== Current ===
Parliamentary Assembly	Country	Population (2021)	Area (km^{2})	GDP (nominal) 2020	GDP per capita (nominal) 2020	GDP per capita (PPP) (2020)
Milli Mejlis	Azerbaijan	10,312,992	86,600	$42 billion	$4,221	$14,474
Parliament	Kazakhstan	19,196,465	2,724,900	$171 billion	$9,122	$26,744
Jogorku Kenesh	Kyrgyzstan	6,527,743	199,900	$7 billion	$1,173	$4,962
Grand National Assembly	Turkey	84,775,404	783,562	$719 billion	$8,536	$28,113
TURKPA		120,812,604	3,794,962	$941 billion		

=== Observer states ===
Parliamentary Assembly	Country	Population	Area (km^{2})	GDP (nominal)	GDP per capita (nominal)	GDP per capita (PPP)
National Assembly	Hungary	9,709,786 (2021)	90,030	$155 billion (2020)	$15,980 (2020)	$33,253 (2020)
Assembly of the Republic	Northern Cyprus	382,836 (2021e)	3,355	$4.23 billion (2018)	$11,129 (2021)	$13,737

Additionally, Parliamentary Union of the OIC Member States (PUIC) and Parliamentary Assembly of the Black Sea Economic Cooperation (PABSEC) are observers of TURKPA.

== List of secretaries-general and chairmen of TURKPA ==
Secretary-General of TURK-PA is elected for four-year terms. Presidency is rotated in every plenary session alphabetically. Chairpersons of National Assemblies becomes ex officio chairman of TURKPA.

No.	Secretary-General	Country	No	Chairperson	Country	Took office	Left office
1	Ramil Hasan	Azerbaijan	1	Ogtay Asadov	Azerbaijan	29 September 2009	27 April 2011
1	Ramil Hasan	Azerbaijan	2	Oral Muhamedjanov	Kazakhstan	27 April 2011	20 January 2012
1	Ramil Hasan	Azerbaijan	3	Nurlan Nigmatulin	Kazakhstan	20 January 2012	14 June 2012
1	Ramil Hasan	Azerbaijan	4	Asylbek Jeenbekov	Kyrgyzstan	14 June 2012	11 June 2013
2	Jandos Asanov	Kazakhstan	5	Cemil Çiçek	Turkey	11 June 2013	12 June 2014
2	Jandos Asanov	Kazakhstan	(1)	Ogtay Asadov	Azerbaijan	12 June 2014	3 December 2015
2	Jandos Asanov	Kazakhstan	6	Kabibulla Dzhakupov	Kazakhstan	3 December 2015	25 March 2016
2	Jandos Asanov	Kazakhstan	7	Baktykozha Izmukhambetov	Kazakhstan	25 March 2016	22 June 2016
2	Jandos Asanov	Kazakhstan	(3)	Nurlan Nigmatulin	Kazakhstan	22 June 2016	8 December 2017
3	Altynbek Mamaiusupov	Kyrgyzstan	8	Dastan Jumabekov	Kyrgyzstan	8 December 2017	21 November 2018
3	Altynbek Mamaiusupov	Kyrgyzstan	9	Binali Yıldırım	Turkey	21 November 2018	18 February 2019
3	Altynbek Mamaiusupov	Kyrgyzstan	10	Mustafa Şentop	Turkey	18 February 2019	18 December 2019
3	Altynbek Mamaiusupov	Kyrgyzstan	(1)	Ogtay Asadov	Azerbaijan	18 December 2019	10 March 2020
3	Altynbek Mamaiusupov	Kyrgyzstan	11	Sahiba Gafarova	Azerbaijan	10 March 2020	28 September 2021
4	Mehmet Süreyya Er	Turkey	(3)	Nurlan Nigmatulin	Kazakhstan	28 September 2021	1 February 2022
4	Mehmet Süreyya Er	Turkey	12	Erlan Qoşanov	Kazakhstan	1 February 2022	30 June 2022
4	Mehmet Süreyya Er	Turkey	13	Talant Mamytov	Kyrgyzstan	1 July 2022	5 October 2022
4	Mehmet Süreyya Er	Turkey	14	Nurlanbek Shakiev	Kyrgyzstan	5 October 2022	28 April 2023
4	Mehmet Süreyya Er	Turkey	(10)	Mustafa Şentop	Turkey	28 April 2023	7 June 2023
4	Mehmet Süreyya Er	Turkey	15	Numan Kurtulmuş	Turkey	7 June 2023	6 June 2024
4	Mehmet Süreyya Er	Turkey	(11)	Sahiba Gafarova	Azerbaijan	6 June 2024	12 June 2025
(1)	Ramil Hasan	Azerbaijan	(12)	Erlan Qoşanov	Kazakhstan	12 June 2025	20 October 2026
(1)	Ramil Hasan	Azerbaijan	16	Marlen Mamataliev	Kyrgyzstan	20 October 2026	incumbent

== See also ==
- World Turks Qurultai

By ISO 639-3 code
Enter an ISO code to find the corresponding language article.
