= 2024 Organization of Turkic States summit =

2024 OTS summit meeting in Uzbekistan

2024 Organization of Turkic States summit 11th Meeting of the Council of Heads of State of the Organization of Turkic States
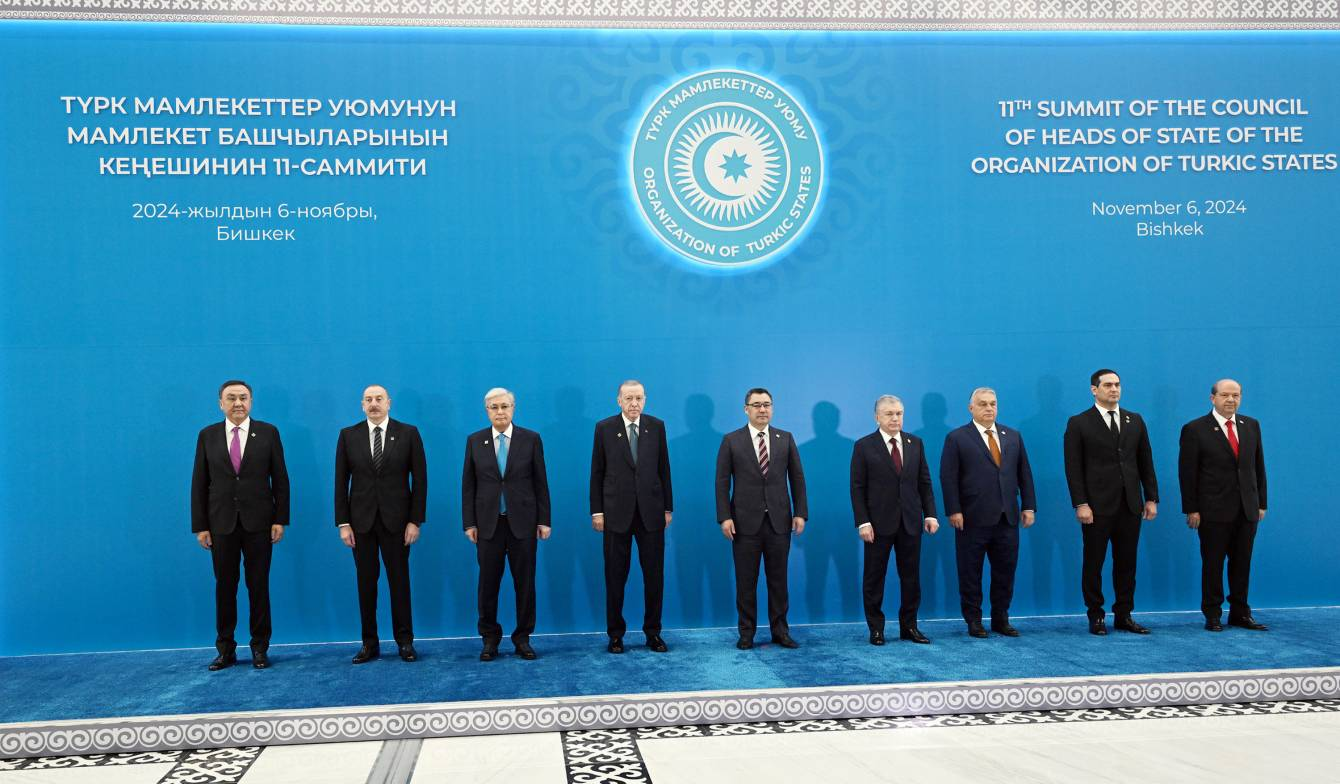
- Photo from the working session of the summit
- Host country: Kyrgyzstan
- Date: November 6, 2024
- Motto: Empowering the Turkic World: Economic Integration, Sustainable Development, Digital Future and Security for all
- Cities: Bishkek
- Chair: Sadyr Japarov, President of Kyrgyzstan
- Follows: 2023 summit
- Precedes: 2025 summit
- Website: www.turkkon.org

The 2024 Organization of Turkic States summit, officially the 11th Meeting of the Council of Heads of State of the Organization of Turkic States summit, was a meeting between the leaders of the Organization of Turkic States in Bishkek, Kyrgyzstan, on 6 November 2024.

== Pre-summit preparations ==
Before the main summit, the Council of Foreign Ministers (CFM) of the OTS convened to finalize documents for the Heads of State to sign, including adopting CFM-level documents and discussing key issues on the organization's agenda. This provided the groundwork for the decisions made during the summit.

== Participants ==
The summit was hosted by the President of the Kyrgyz Republic, Sadyr Japarov. Key leaders and officials from OTS member states participated, including:

Members

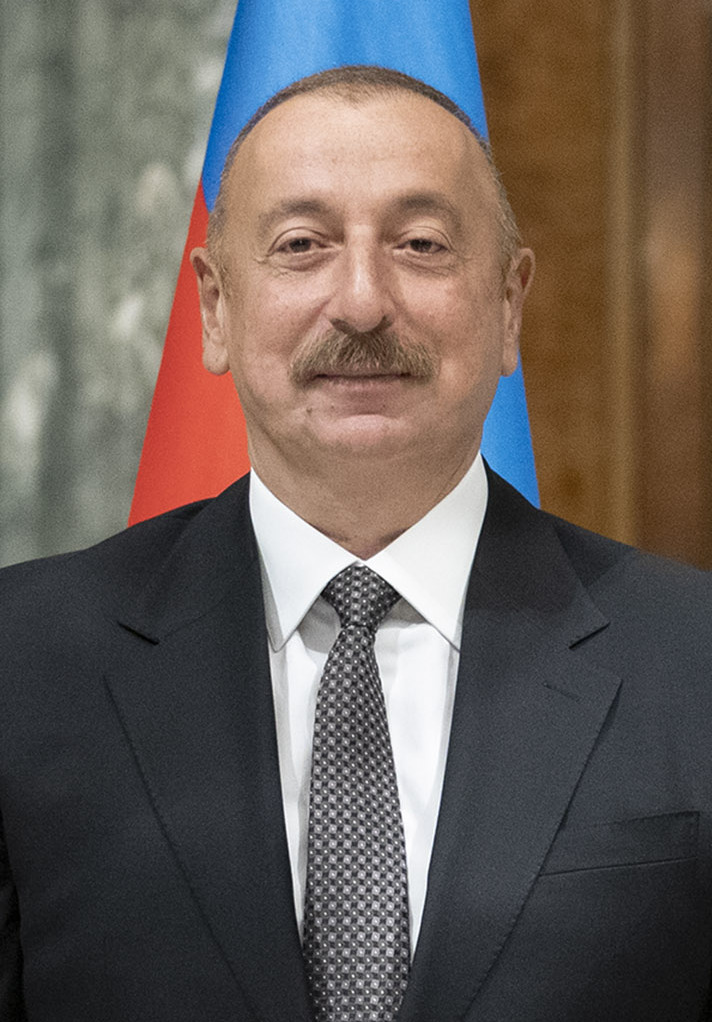
Azerbaijan
Ilham Aliyev, President

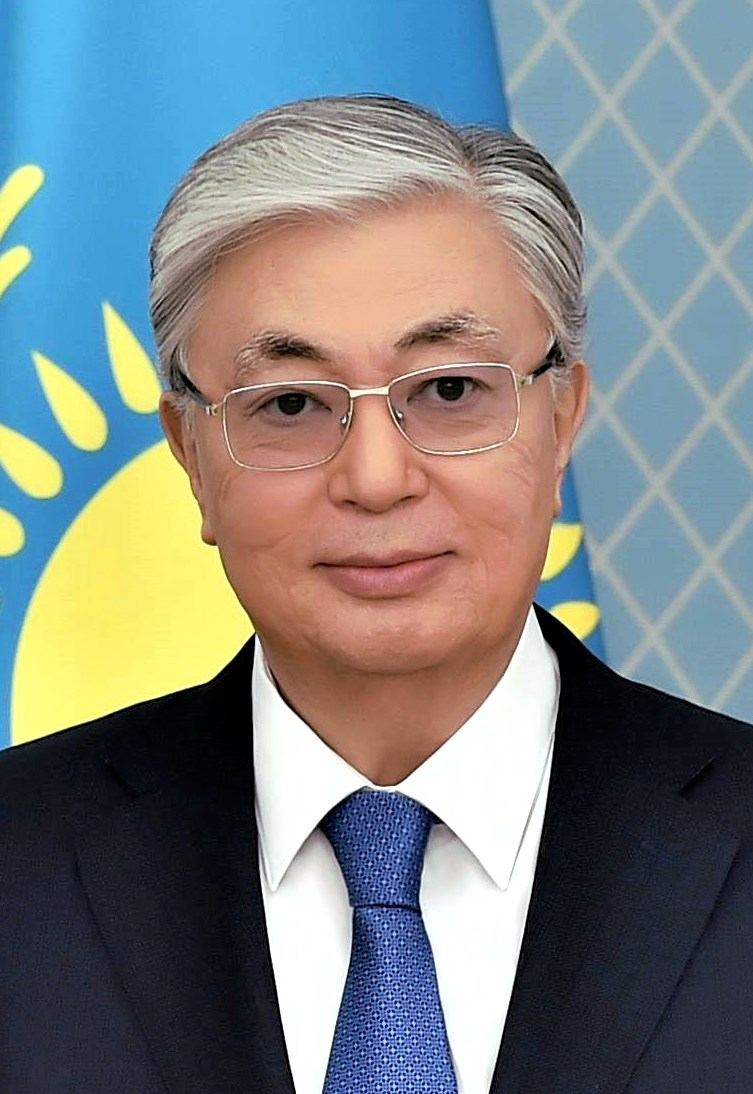
Kazakhstan
Kassym-Jomart Tokayev, President

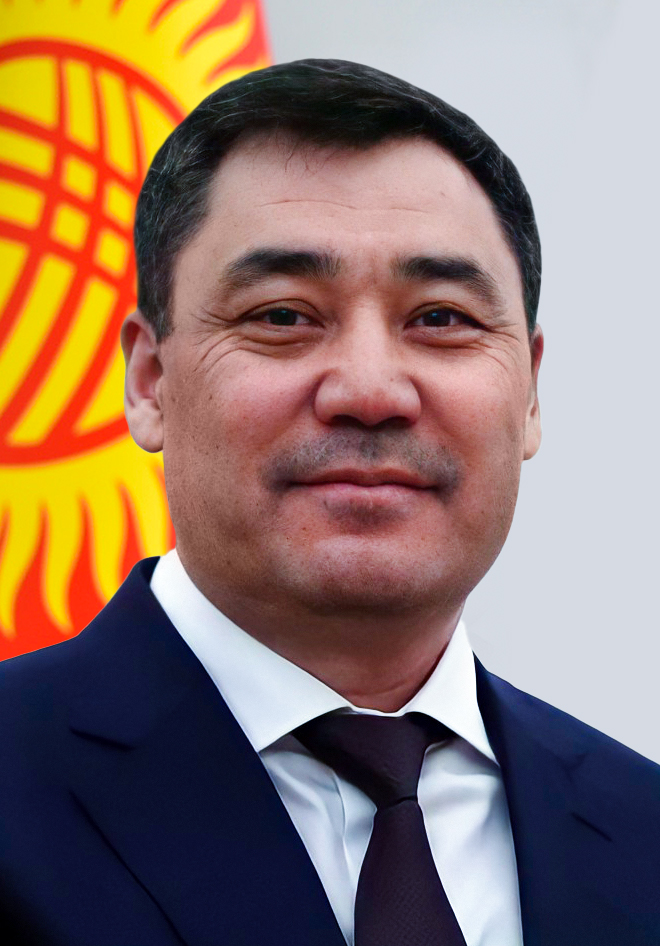
Kyrgyzstan
Sadyr Japarov, President

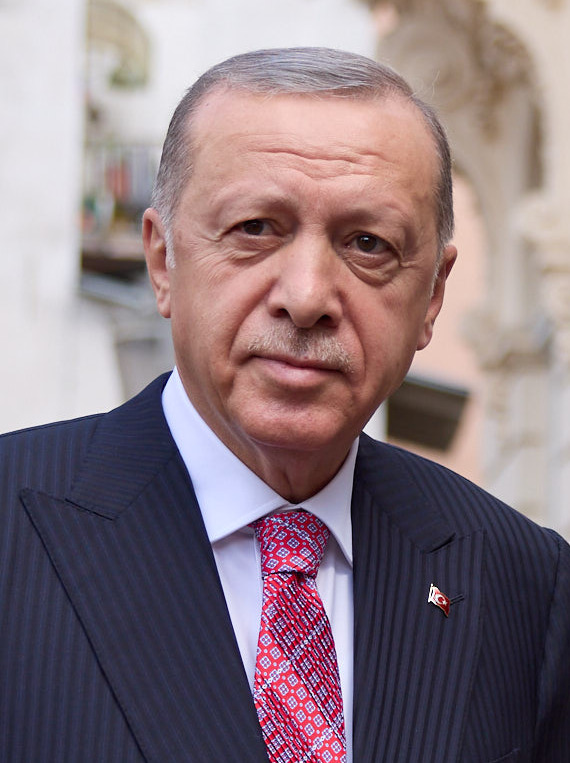
Turkey
Recep Tayyip Erdoğan, President

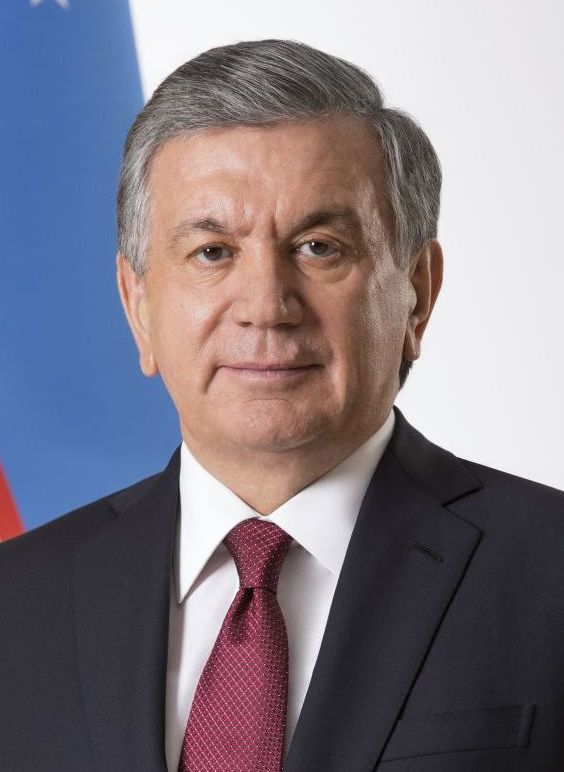
Uzbekistan
Shavkat Mirziyoyev, President (Host)

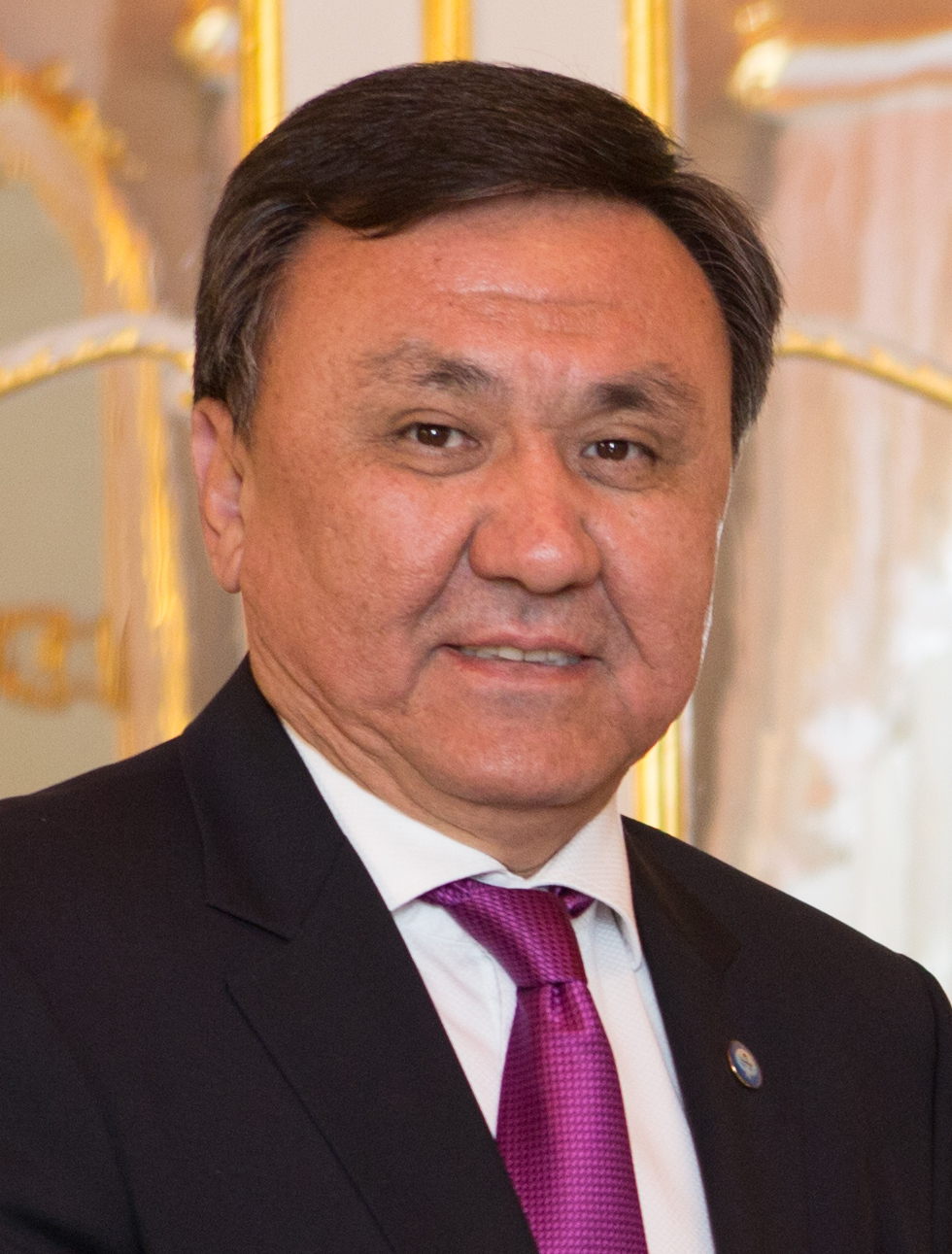
Organization of Turkic States
Kubanychbek Omuraliev, Secretary General
Observers

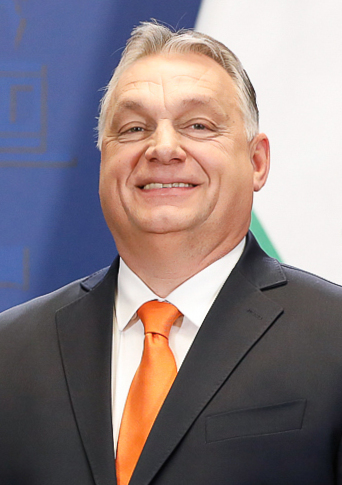
Hungary
Viktor Orbán, Prime Minister

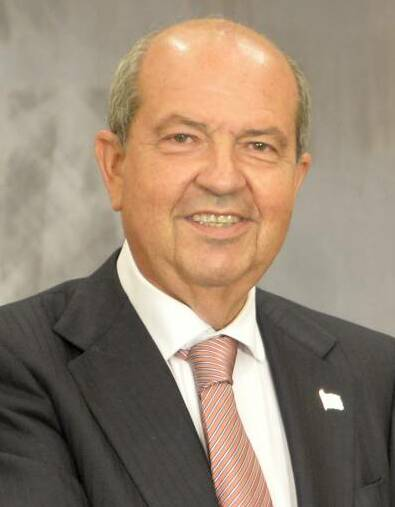
Northern Cyprus
Ersin Tatar, President
- Turkmenistan
  Golliyev Nury Gutlyyevich, Ambassador of Turkmenistan to Bishkek

Additionally, the chairman and members of the Council of Elders of the OTS, along with heads of various Turkic cooperation organizations, attended the summit.

== Summit theme and key decisions ==
The summit, themed "Empowering the Turkic World: Economic Integration, Sustainable Development, Digital Future, and Security for All," emphasized deepening cooperation among member states. The Heads of State reiterated their commitment to enhancing solidarity through the OTS framework. Several key decisions and resolutions were made during the summit:

Key outcomes:

1. Adoption of the Turkic Green Vision: The member states agreed on a unified approach to sustainable development under the "Turkic Green Vision: Unity for a Sustainable Future."
2. Bishkek as the Digital Capital: Bishkek was designated as the Digital Capital of the Turkic World for the year 2025.
3. Adoption of the Charter of the Turkic World: A new organizational charter was adopted to guide the cooperation and future operations of the OTS.
4. OTS Flag and Permanent Representation Regulation: The flag of the OTS was officially adopted, and a regulation for the permanent representatives of the OTS was finalized.
5. Appointments: The appointment of new Deputy Secretary-Generals to the OTS Secretariat was confirmed.

Several agreements and memoranda were signed by ministers and heads of institutions from the member states:

- Digital Economy Partnership Agreement: To foster collaboration in the digital economy among OTS members.
- Civil Protection Mechanism: Establishment of a collective civil protection mechanism for the member states.
- Council of Central (National) Banks: A Memorandum of Understanding (MoU) for the creation of the Council of Central Banks to enhance economic coordination.
- Space-Related Activities: An MoU to promote cooperation in space-related activities.
- Turkic Large Language Model: An MoU to develop a common language model among OTS members.
- Turkic Green Finance Council: An MoU to create a Green Finance Council to support sustainable economic growth.

The summit also provided a platform for leaders to discuss current regional and international developments. They reviewed ongoing global issues and exchanged views on security, economic integration, and digital transformation.

At the proposal of President Sadyr Zhaparov, Hungarian Prime Minister Viktor Orbán was awarded the Supreme Order of Turkic World for his role in promoting unity within the Turkic World.

Following the summit, Secretary-General of the OTS, Kubanchbek Omuraliev, and Kyrgyz Foreign Minister Jeenbek Kulubayev held a press conference. They elaborated on the outcomes of the summit, discussing the key resolutions and agreements signed, and emphasizing the importance of the OTS in promoting collaboration among Turkic nations.

At the conclusion of the summit, the chairmanship of the OTS was officially transferred from Kazakhstan to Kyrgyzstan. The Heads of State also signed the Bishkek Summit Declaration, outlining their collective goals and decisions. The next regular summit was scheduled to take place in Azerbaijan in 2025, while an informal summit will be held in Hungary later in the same year.

== See also ==
- Politics of Asia
- Politics of Europe
