= 2023 Organization of Turkic States summit =

2023 OTS summit meeting in Uzbekistan

2023 Organization of Turkic States summit 10th Meeting of the Council of Heads of State of the Organization of Turkic States
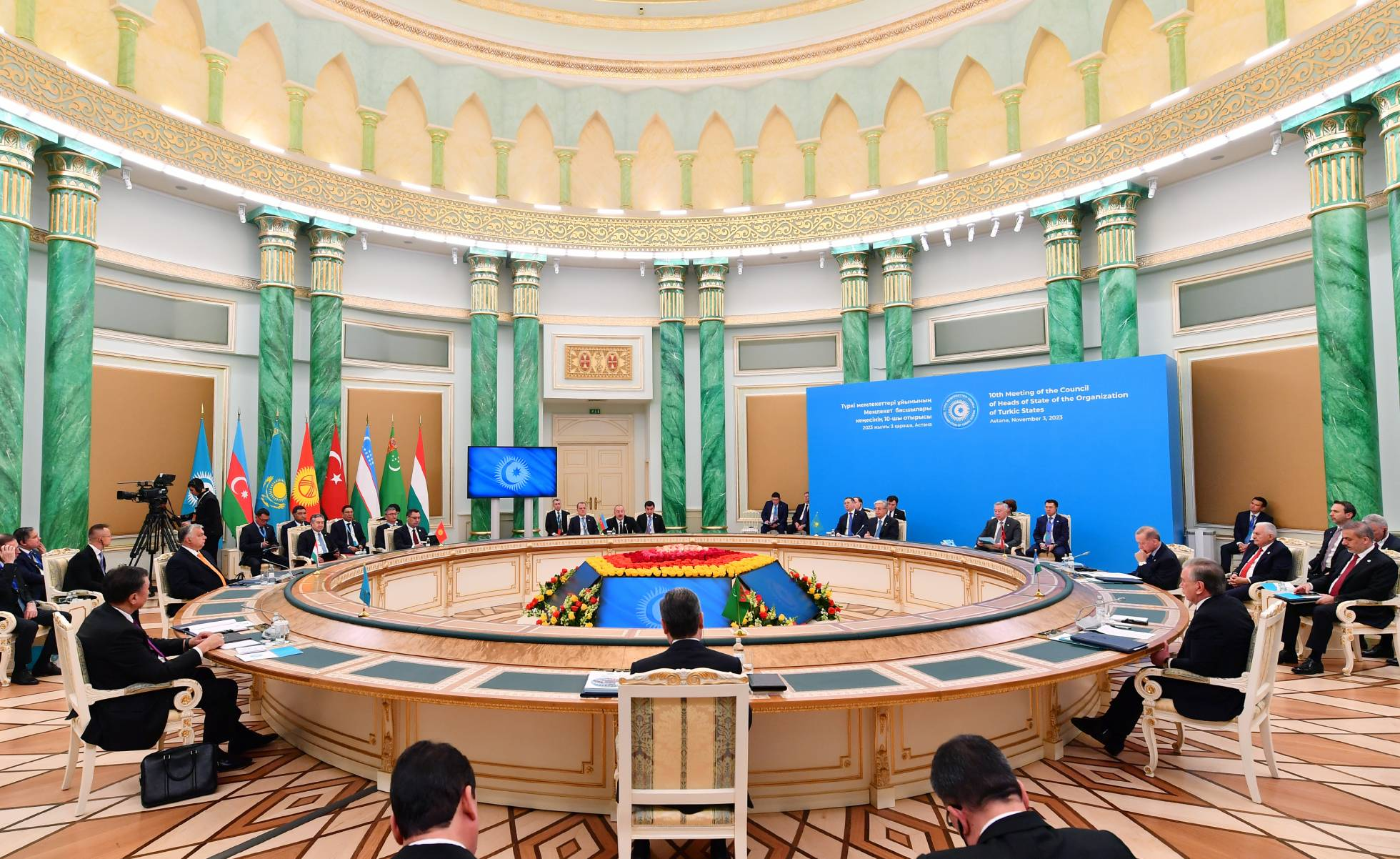
- Photo from the working session of the summit
- Host country: Kazakhstan
- Date: November 3, 2023
- Motto: Turk Time
- Cities: Astana
- Chair: Kassym-Jomart Tokayev, President of Kazakhstan
- Follows: 2022 summit
- Precedes: 2024 summit
- Website: www.turkkon.org

The 2023 Organization of Turkic States summit, officially the 10th Meeting of the Council of Heads of State of the Organization of Turkic States summit, was a meeting between the leaders of the Organization of Turkic States in Astana, Kazakhstan, on 3 November 2023.

== Background ==
Prior to the Summit, the Council of Foreign Ministers of the OTS met to finalize documents for signing by the Heads of State and discuss various agenda items. The Summit, held under the theme "Turk Time", highlighted the leaders' commitment to deepening cooperation within the Turkic World and bolstering solidarity among Turkic States through the OTS framework.

== Summit ==
Key decisions made during the Summit included the adoption of the Astana Act, designating February 6 as the "Day of Remembrance and Solidarity with the Disaster Victims of the Turkic World" upon the initiative of Uzbekistan, establishing Astana and Istanbul as financial centers, aligning the flags of the Turkic Cooperation Organizations and granting observer status to Economic Cooperation Organization.

Additionally, the Ministers and Heads of Institutions of the Member States signed the "Protocol on Cooperation in the Field of Metrology among the Relevant Institutions of the Member States of the Organization of Turkic States" and the "Joint Action Plan for the Implementation of the Transport Connectivity Program of the Organization of Turkic States for 2023-2027".

The leaders also discussed recent regional and international developments, and President Shavkat Mirziyoyev was honored with the Supreme Order of Turkic World for his "significant contribution to strengthening Turkic unity".

Concluding the Summit, the Heads of State signed the Tenth Summit Declaration of the OTS. The chairmanship transitioned from Uzbekistan to Kazakhstan. The leaders announced that the next Summit is scheduled to take place in Kyrgyzstan in 2024.

== Participants ==
Members

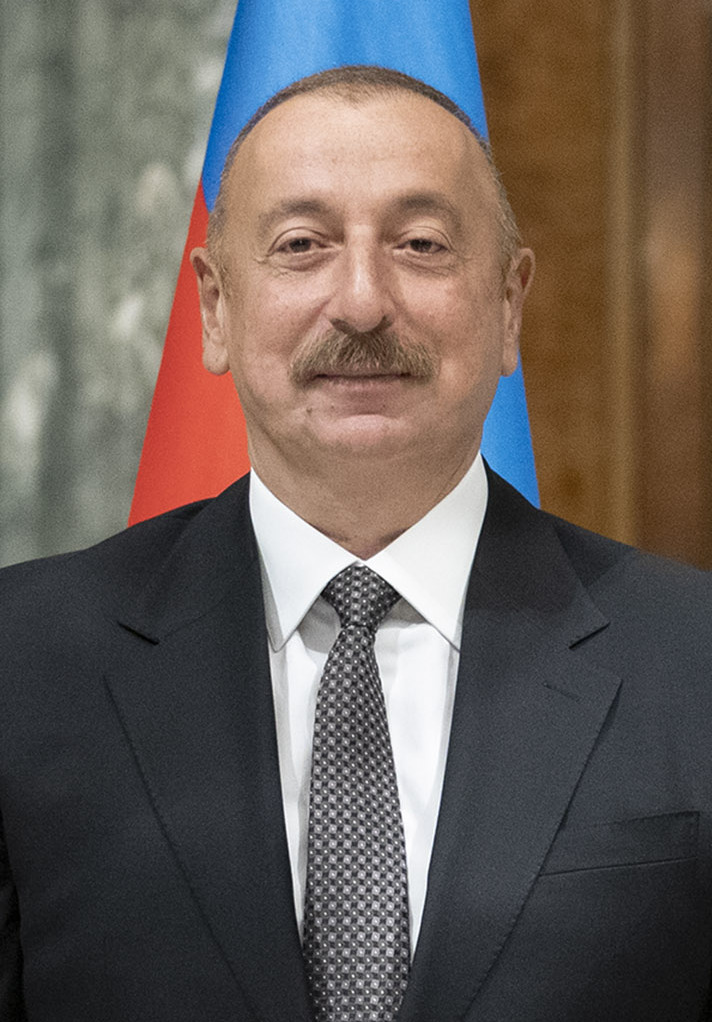
Azerbaijan
Ilham Aliyev, President

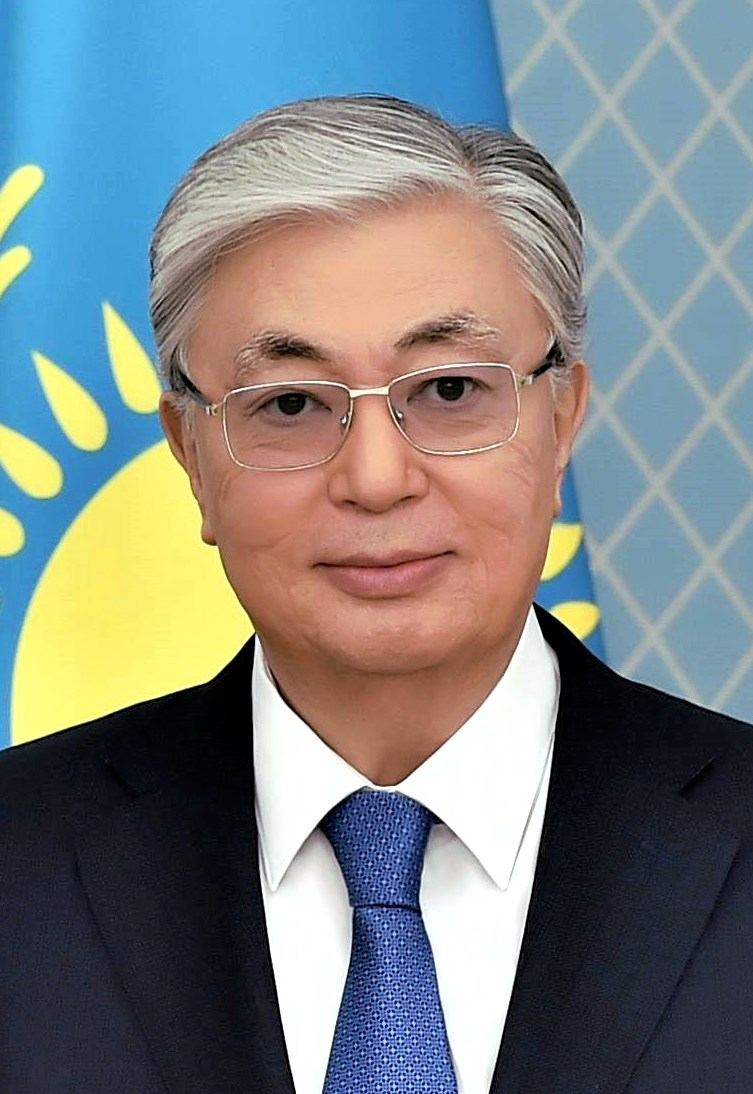
Kazakhstan
Kassym-Jomart Tokayev, President

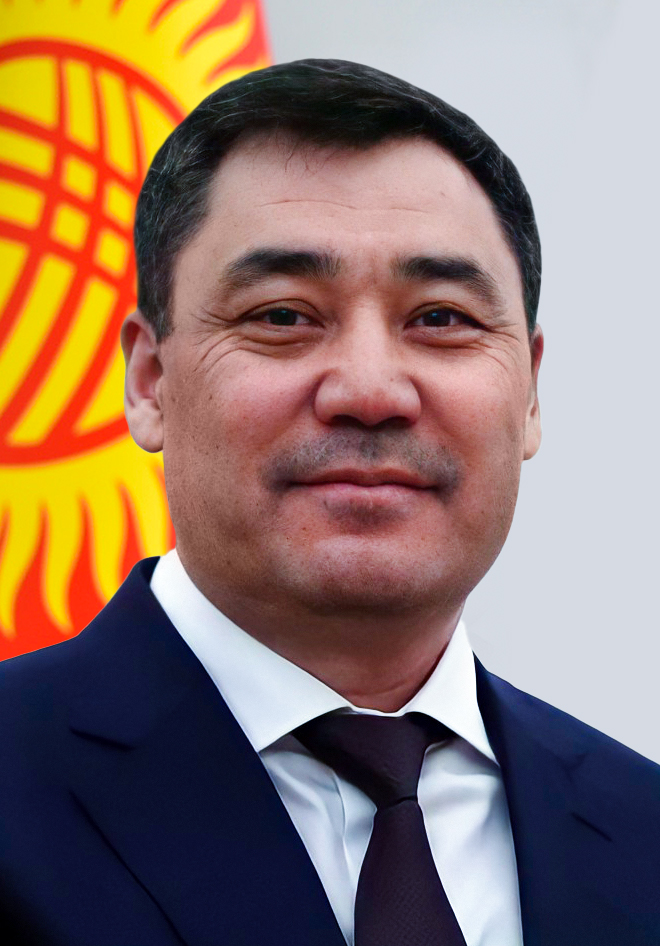
Kyrgyzstan
Sadyr Japarov, President

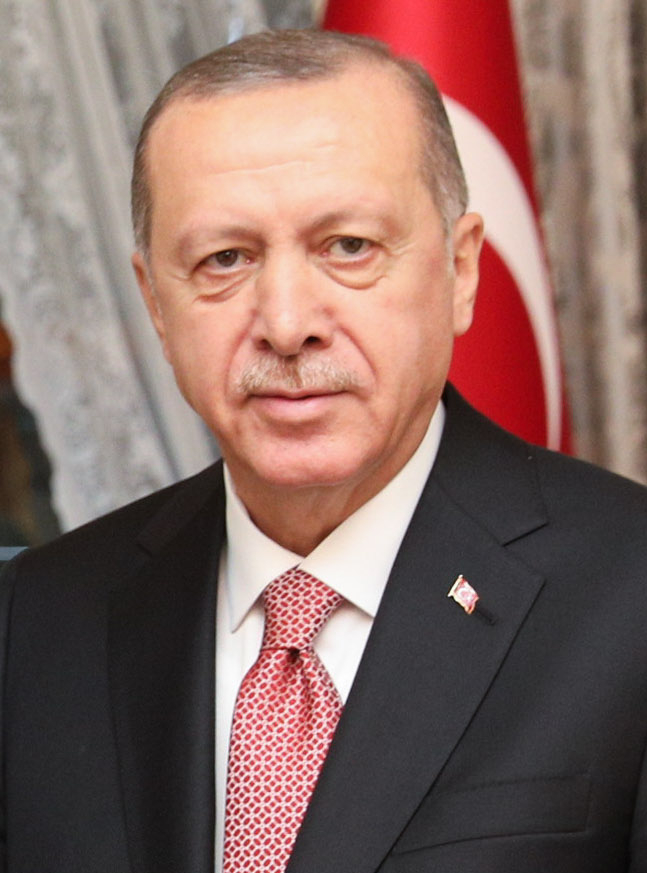
Turkey
Recep Tayyip Erdoğan, President

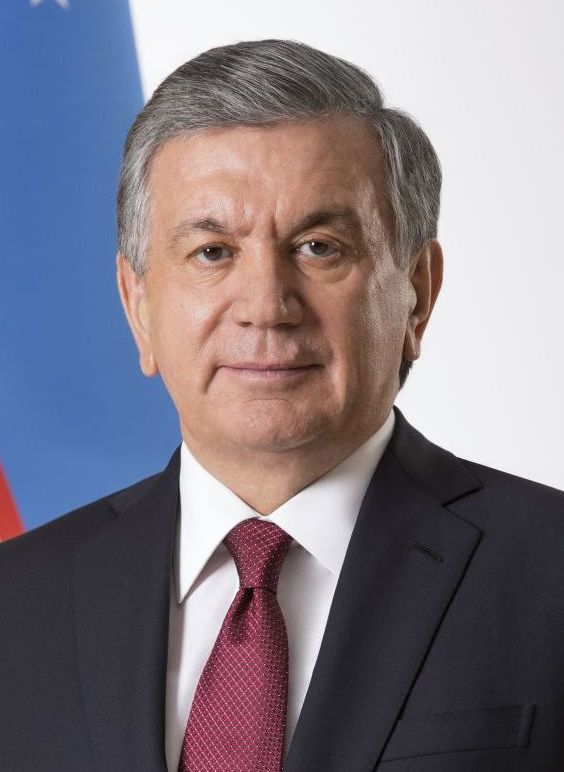
Uzbekistan
Shavkat Mirziyoyev, President (Host)

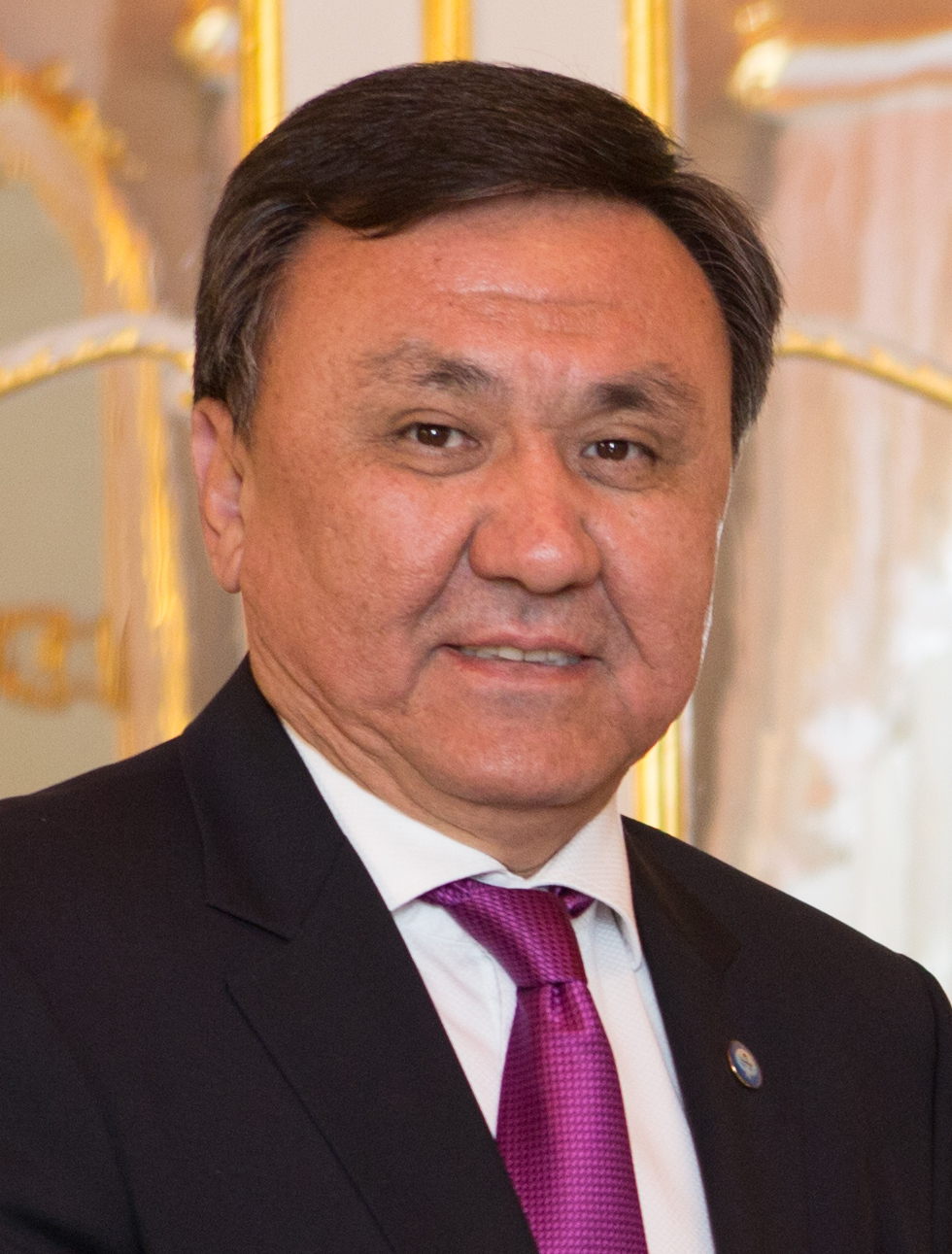
Organization of Turkic States
Kubanychbek Omuraliev, Secretary General
Observers

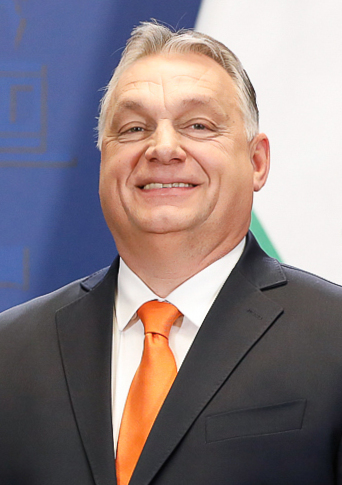
Hungary
Viktor Orbán, Prime Minister

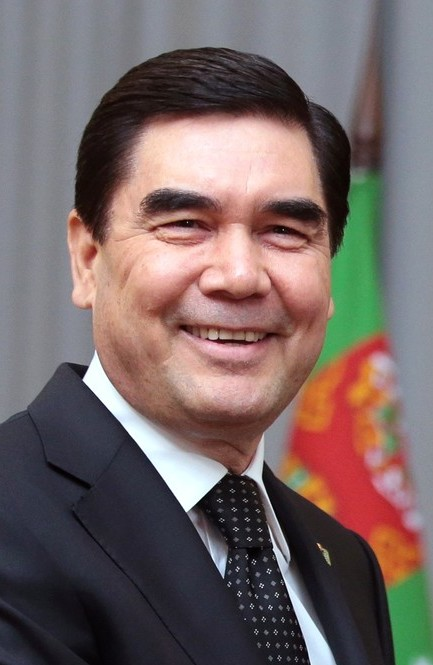
Turkmenistan
Gurbanguly Berdimuhamedow, Chairman

== See also ==
- Politics of Asia
- Politics of Europe
