= ASGP =

ASGP may refer to:

- Association of State Green Parties, in the United States 1996–2001
- Association of Secretaries General of Parliaments, an international association
