= Ramil Hasan =

Azerbaijani diplomat (born 1978)

- Ramil Həsən
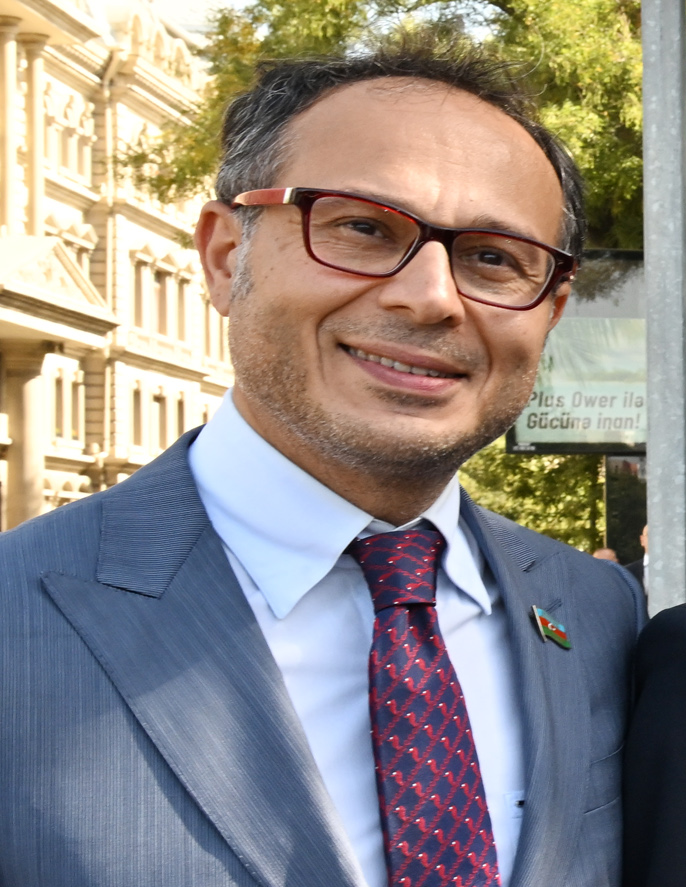

2nd Secretary-General of the Organization of Turkic States
- In office 3 July 2018 – 16 July 2014
- Preceded by: Halil Akıncı
- Succeeded by: Baghdad Amreyev

Personal details
- Born: 23 September 1978 (age 47) Qafan, Soviet Union
- Party: New Azerbaijan Party

Ramil Hasan (Azerbaijani: Ramil Həsən) is an Azerbaijani diplomat. He served as the Secretary-General of the Organization of Turkic States between July 2014 to July 2018. He also was the secretary-general of the Parliamentary Assembly of Turkic-speaking States (TURKPA).

== Early life ==
Hasan was born on September 23, 1978, in the Gafan district of the Armenian Soviet Socialist Republic. Ramil Hasan graduated from Baku State University with a bachelor's degree and a master's degree in the history of international relations. He has the diplomatic rank of Ambassador Extraordinary and Plenipotentiary of the first class.

== Career ==
Hasan served as a Member of the Board of Qaradağ Municipality during 1999-2002.

Between 2002 and 2010, Hasan worked as a Head of the Department at the State Committee on Work with Diaspora. He also served as the chairman of the youth branch of the New Azerbaijan Party from 2005 to 2010.

Between 2008 and 2014, Hasan lectured “Contemporary Azerbaijani Foreign Policy” at the Faculty of International Relations of Baku State University. Hasan was elected as the first Secretary General of TURKPA for a four-year term held on 29 September 2009 in Baku.

Hasan was appointed as the Secretary General of the Cooperation Council of Turkic Speaking States on 5 June 2014.

== Personal life ==
Aside from his native language, Hasan also speaks English, Russian and Turkish. He is married and has 2 children.

== Awards and titles ==
Ramil Hasan was awarded the gold medal of the Crans Montana Forum.
