= 2022 Organization of Turkic States summit =

2022 OTS summit meeting in Uzbekistan

2022 Organization of Turkic States summit Meeting of the Council of Heads of State of the Organization of Turkic States
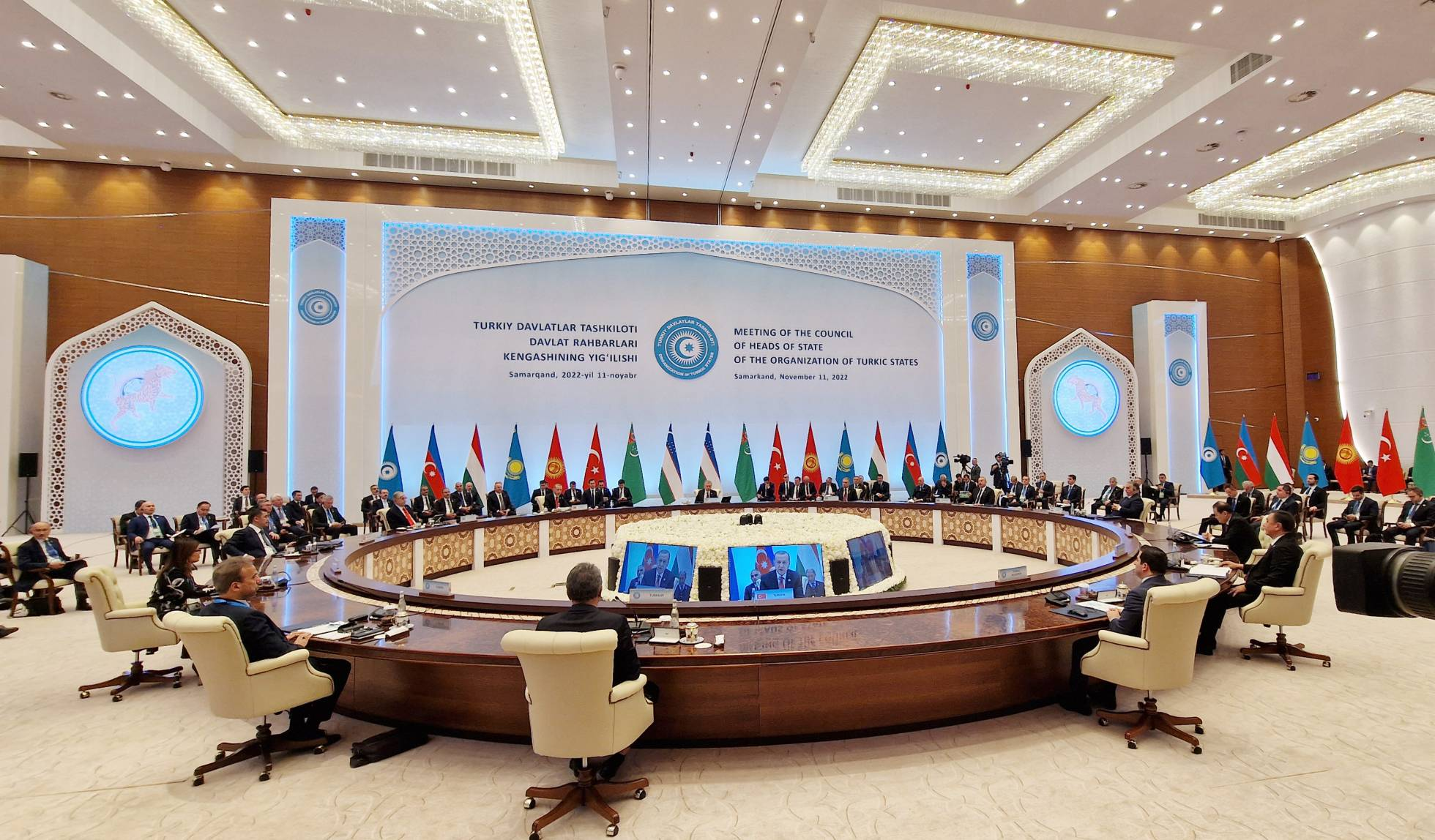
- Photo from the working session of the summit
- Host country: Uzbekistan
- Date: November 11, 2022
- Motto: New Era for Turkic Civilization: Towards Common Development and Prosperity
- Cities: Samarkand
- Chair: Shavkat Mirziyoyev
- Follows: 2021 Turkic Council summit
- Precedes: 2023 Organization of Turkic States summit
- Website: www.turkkon.org

The 2022 Organization of Turkic States summit, officially the Meeting of the Council of Heads of State of the Organization of Turkic States summit, was a meeting between the leaders of the Organization of Turkic States in Samarkand, Uzbekistan, on 11 November 2022.

== Background ==
It was the first summit after the transformation of the Turkic Council into the Organization of Turkic States.

Prior to the summit, two separate meetings were held in Uzbekistan by the ministers of economy and ministers of foreign affairs

== Summit ==
The summit adopted the organization's strategic action plan for the next five years. The main agenda topics among others were the decisions and signing of the protocol on amendments to the Nakhchivan Agreement, the Trade Facilitation Strategy of the Organization of Turkic States, the Agreement on Establishment of Simplified Customs Corridor, the Agreement on International Combined Freight Transport, Transport Connectivity Program, the Memorandum of Understanding Between Relevant Institutions of the Member States of the Organization of Turkic States About Digital Human Resources Systems, and the Trade Facilitation Strategy of the Organization of Turkic States. During the meeting, the leaders also discussed recent regional and international developments.

One of the key decisions of the Summit was the establishment of the Turkic Investment Fund which aims to provide the necessary resources for the economies of member states and observer states and help build a more integrated Turkic financial system.

During the summit, Turkish President Recep Tayyip Erdoğan and former Turkmen President Gurbanguly Berdimuhamedow were awarded with the Supreme Order of Turkic World.

Northern Cyprus was granted the status of observer.

== Participants ==
Members

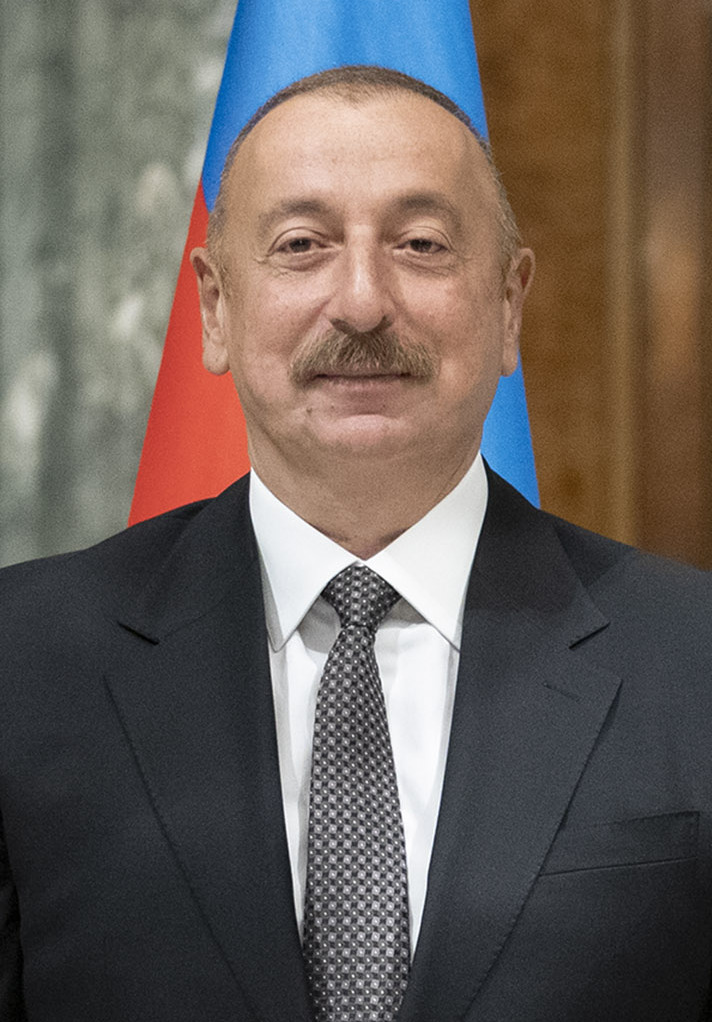
Azerbaijan
Ilham Aliyev, President

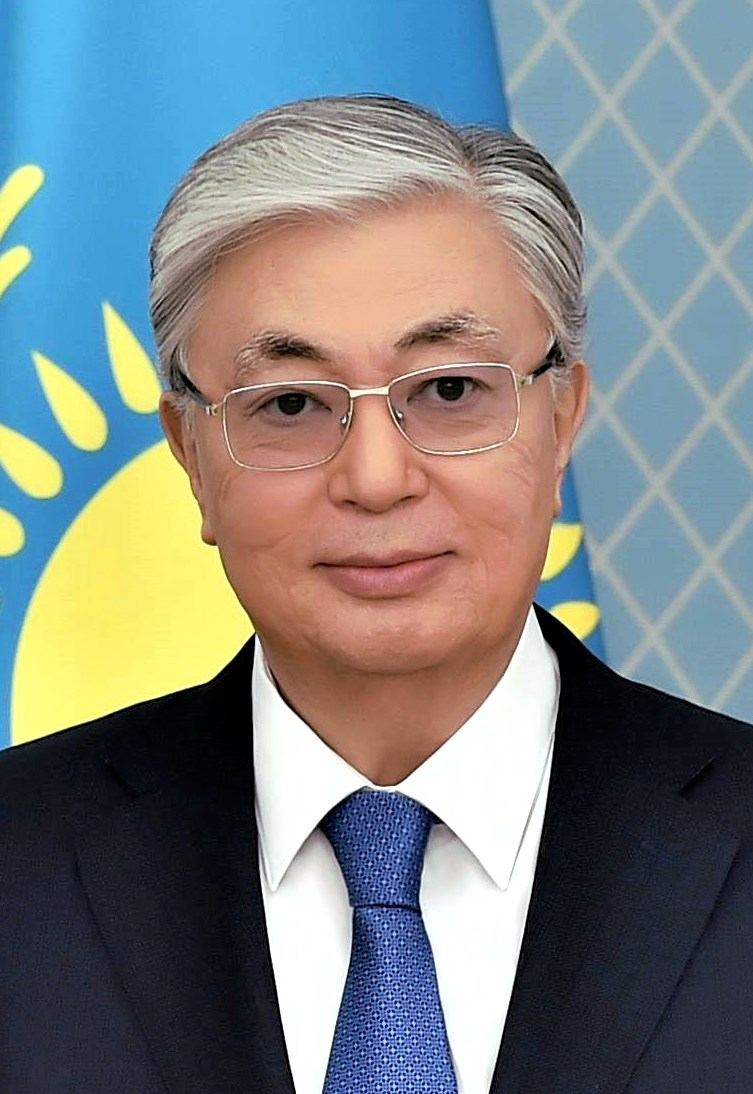
Kazakhstan
Kassym-Jomart Tokayev, President

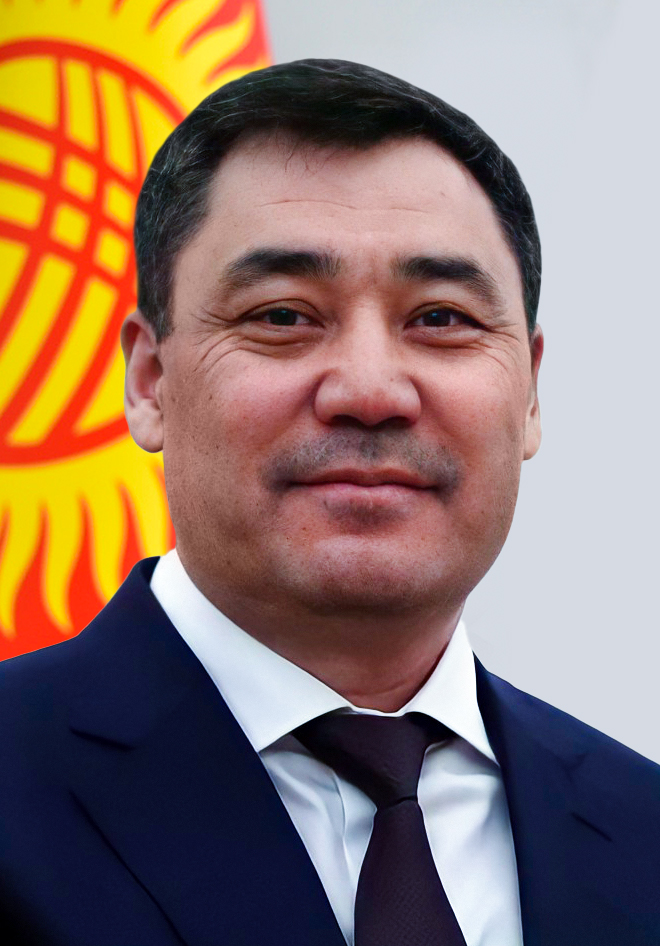
Kyrgyzstan
Sadyr Japarov, President

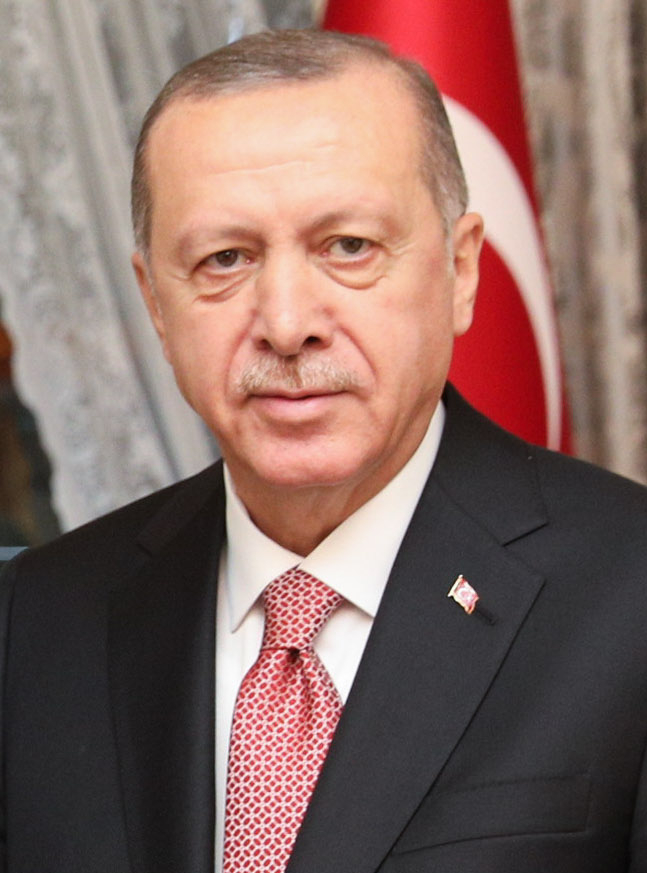
Turkey
Recep Tayyip Erdoğan, President

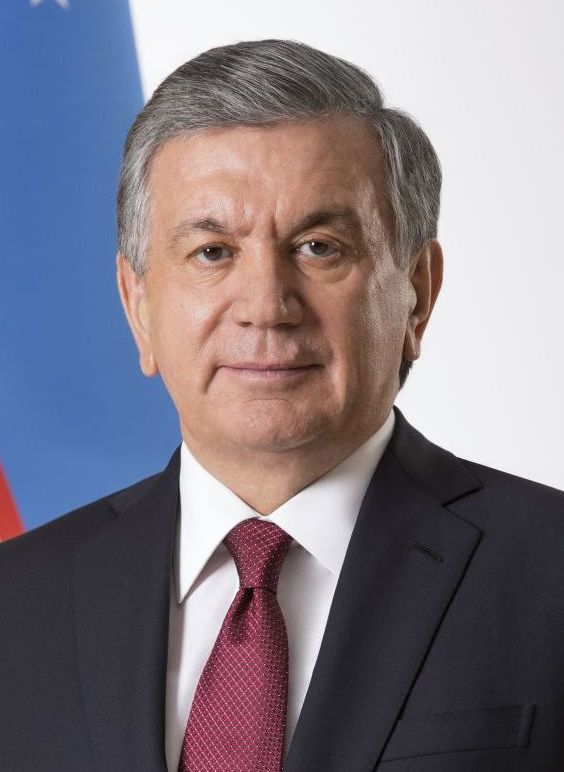
Uzbekistan
Shavkat Mirziyoyev, President (Host)

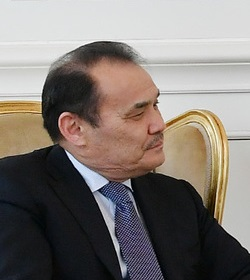
Organization of Turkic States
Baghdad Amreyev, Secretary General
Observers

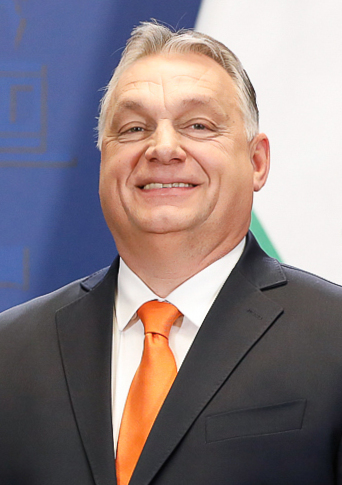
Hungary
Viktor Orbán, Prime Minister

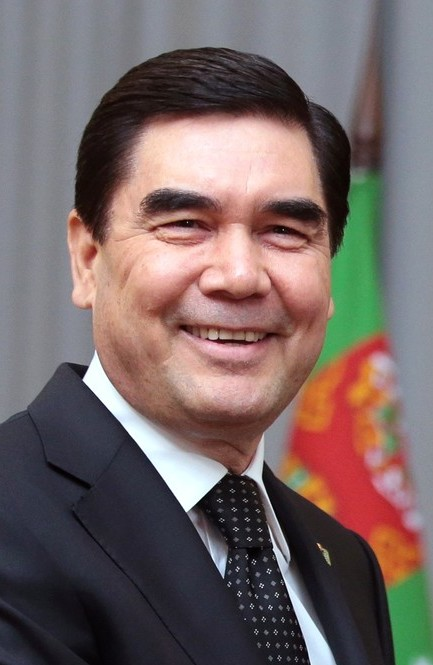
Turkmenistan
Gurbanguly Berdimuhamedow, Chairman

== See also ==
- Politics of Asia
- Politics of Europe
