= Turkic Academy =

International research institute

Turkic Academy: - Azerbaijani: Türk Akademiyası; Kazakh: Túrki Akademiasy; Kyrgyz: Түрк Aкадемиясы; Turkish: Türk Akademisi; Uzbek: Turkiy Akademiya
- Turkic World Educational and Scientific Cooperation Organization
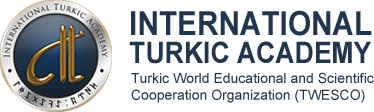
- Logo used until 2023
- Members Observers
- Abbreviation: formerly TWESCO
- Formation: October 3, 2009 (Proposal); May 25, 2010 (Foundation); August 23, 2012 (Signature of Agreement); 2021 (Ratification of Agreement)
- Headquarters: Astana, Kazakhstan
- President: Shahin Mustafayev
- Parent organization: Organization of Turkic States
- Website: turkicacademy.org

The Turkic Academy, previously known as Turkic World Educational and Scientific Cooperation Organization, or International Turkic Academy is an international institute for Turkology research involving Azerbaijan, Kazakhstan, Kyrgyzstan and Turkey. Hungary and Uzbekistan have observer status.

== History ==
On 3 October 2009 during the Nakhchivan Sumkit, the President of Kazakhstan Nursultan Nazarbayev proposed the creation of an international research center tasked with conducting research on the Turkic world. Next year, on 25 May 2010, the Turkic Academy was founded in Kazakhstan. On 23 August 2012, it was agreed for the organization to become international institution during the second summit of the Turkic Council in Bishkek. Ratification was completed in 2021.

In 2018, Hungary was granted observer status in the academy during the 6th Turkic Council summit. Uzbekistan was granted observer status at the 2022 Samarkand Summit.

The logo of the academy included the English phrase "International Turkic Academy" with Latin script and Old Turkic "𐱅𐰇𐰼𐰜:𐰀𐰚𐰀𐰓𐰢𐰃" in Old Turkic script. This was criticized due to a misspelling in Old Turkic. Old Turkic phrase is changed later to "𐱅𐰇𐰼𐰜:𐰀𐰴𐰓𐰢𐰃", while the term "International" dropped from English part with the 2023 logo.

== Academic works ==
The Academy published an academic journal "Altaistics, Turkology and Mongolistics" quarterly between 2013 and 2020. There was a news bulletin "Turkic Weekly" published weekly consisting of recent news from Turkic nations between November 2015 and June 2022. The journal "Global-Turk" was published between 2014-2021.

The Academy completed "Common Turkic History", "Common Turkic Literature" and "Geography of the Turkic World" projects in 2023. Also, the academy holds a scientific council annually.

List of Scientific councils
| | Date | Location |
|---|---|---|
| 1 | 5 September 2015 | Astana |
| 3 | 30 January 2020 | Baku |
| 4 | 5 November 2021 | Istanbul |
| 5 | 24 June 2022 | Astana |
| 6 | 28 March 2023 | Bishkek |
| 7 | 1 June 2024 | Shusha |
| 8 | 8 June 2026 | Turkistan |

== Administration ==
Academy is administered by president and vice-presidents from each member state. Presidency term is four years, with rotating presidency among member states. Second President Kydyrali's term is expanded by four years in 2018. In November 2022, Shahin Mustafayev is appointed as president.

| # | President | Start | End | Scientific Council Presidency | Start | End |
|---|---|---|---|---|---|---|
| 1 | Shakir Ibrayev | 2010 | 2014 | N/A | | |
| 2 | Darkhan Kydyrali | 2014 | 11 November 2022 | Kazakhstan | 5 September 2015 | |
| 2 | Darkhan Kydyrali | 2014 | 11 November 2022 | Kyrgyzstan | | 30 January 2020 |
| 2 | Darkhan Kydyrali | 2014 | 11 November 2022 | Azerbaijan | 30 January 2020 | 5 November 2021 |
| 2 | Darkhan Kydyrali | 2014 | 11 November 2022 | Turkey | 5 November 2021 | 24 June 2022 |
| 2 | Darkhan Kydyrali | 2014 | 11 November 2022 | Kazakhstan | 24 June 2022 | 28 March 2023 |
| 3 | Shahin Mustafayev | 11 November 2022 | incumbent | Kyrgyzstan | 28 March 2023 | 1 June 2024 |
| 3 | Shahin Mustafayev | 11 November 2022 | incumbent | Azerbaijan | 1 June 2024 | 8 June 2026 |
| 3 | Shahin Mustafayev | 11 November 2022 | incumbent | Kazakhstan | 8 June 2026 | incumbent |
