= List of international organizations based in Istanbul =

This is a list of international organizations based in Istanbul, Turkey.

== List ==
Organization	Acronym	Official website	Notes
Developing 8	D-8	developing8.org	General Secretariat
Islamic Conference Youth Forum for Dialogue and Cooperation	ICYF-DC	icyf-dc.org	An affiliated institution of the OIC.
Organization of the Black Sea Economic Cooperation	BSEC	bsec-organization.org	Permanent International Secretariat of the Organization of the Black Sea Economic Cooperation (BSEC PERMIS)
Organization of Turkic States	OTS	turkkon.org	General Secretariat
Research Centre for Islamic History, Art and Culture	IRCICA	ircica.org	A subsidiary organization of the OIC.
Standards and Metrology Institute for Islamic Countries	SMIIC	smiic.org	An affiliated institution of the OIC.
Support for Sustainable Communities	SSC		Non Profit Organization
