= Baghdad Amreyev =

Kazakh diplomat (born 1959)

- Бағдат Әміреев
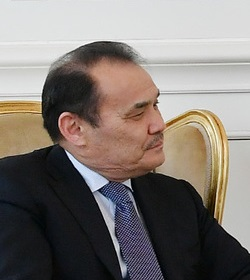
- Amreyev in 2019

3rd Secretary-General of the Organization of Turkic States
- In office 3 September 2018 – 11 November 2022
- Honorary President: Nursultan Nazarbayev
- Preceded by: Ramil Hasan
- Succeeded by: Kubanychbek Omuraliev

President of the Turkic Investment Fund
- Incumbent
- Assumed office 12 November 2022

Personal details
- Born: 1 March 1959 (age 67) Sozak District, Turkistan Region, Kazakh SSR, Soviet Union

Baghdad Kultayuly Amreyev (Kazakh: Бағдат Құлтайұлы Әміреев, romanized: Bağdat Qūltaiūly Ämıreev, Russian: Багдад Култаевич Амреев; born 1 March 1959) is a Kazakh political figure and diplomat. He served as the Secretary-General of the Organization of Turkic States between 2018 and 2022.

== Early life and career ==
He was born on 1 March 1959 in the village of Sholakkorgan, Turkistan Region, Soviet Union. In 1982, he graduated from the Tajik National University with a degree in Arab orientology. From 1985 to 1988, he was a teacher of the Arabic language and literature at the Kazakh State University. From 1991 to 1992, he was a senior lecturer at the Department of Arabic Philology, Kazakh State University. He has served as Advisor to the Prime Minister of Kazakhstan since 2014. During his service in the Middle East, he was also Coordinating Ambassador to African States and Permanent Representative to Islamic Educational, Scientific and Cultural Organization (ISESCO).

== Diplomatic service ==
In the 1980s. he served as a translator in Yemen, Syria and Iraq. In the early 90s, he was First Secretary - Deputy Head of the Department of the Middle East and Africa of the Ministry of Foreign Affairs of Kazakhstan. Beginning in 1996, he became ambassador to foreign states. In order, he served as ambassador to Saudi Arabia, Oman, Bahrain and Kuwait, the UAE, Egypt, Syria, Lebanon, Morocco, Jordan, Libya, Turkey, Albania, and Iran.

== Secretary-General ==
During his tenure, he has called for a united state overseeing the Turkic world.

In 2020, during the conflict starting in September, Amreyev declared his support to Azerbaijan against Armenia. On 12 May 2021, he condemned the Israeli role in the 2021 Israel–Palestine crisis, describing it as the "unproportioned use of force by Israeli security forces against innocent Palestinian civilians". He also called on the Israeli administration to take "the necessary measures for a peaceful resolution of the situation and an immediate cessation of attacks on civilians and armed infiltration of Muslim holy sites".

== Personal life ==
Aside from his native Kazakh, he speaks Russian, English, Turkish, Arabic, Persian and Tajik. He is married to Ardak Amreyeva and has three children.

== Awards and titles ==
- Order of Honor (2003)
- Medal "20 years of independence of the Republic of Kazakhstan" (2011)
- Ambassador Extraordinary and Plenipotentiary 1st Class

=== Foreign honours ===
- Azerbaijan: Dostlug Order in 2022.
- Uzbekistan: Tourism adherent in 2022.
