= Halil Akıncı =

Turkish diplomat

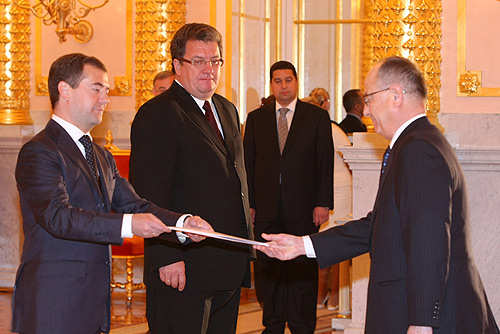
Akıncı presenting his credentials to Dmitry Medvedev on 18 September 2008.

Halil Akıncı (born 9 December 1945) is a retired Turkish diplomat who served as the Turkish Ambassador to Slovenia, India, and Russia. He was formerly the Secretary General of the Turkic Council.
