= Organization of Turkic States =

Eurasian intergovernmental organization

- - Azerbaijani: Türk Dövlətləri Təşkilatı
  - Kazakh: Түркі мемлекеттері ұйымы
  - Kyrgyz: Түрк мамлекеттер уюму
  - Turkish: Türk Devletleri Teşkilatı
  - Uzbek: Turkiy davlatlar tashkiloti
- Flag Emblem
- Motto: Together we are stronger!: Biz birlikdə daha güclüyük! (Azerbaijani); Біз бірге мықтымыз! (Kazakh); Биз бирге күчтүрөөкбүз! (Kyrgyz); Biz birlikte daha güçlüyüz! (Turkish); Biz birgalikda kuchliroqmiz! (Uzbek)
- Member states Observer states
- Political centres: (Azerbaijan) Baku, Azerbaijan^{a}; (Hungary) Budapest, Hungary^{b}; (Turkey) Istanbul, Turkey^{c}; (Kyrgyzstan) Bishkek, Kyrgyzstan^{d}; (Kazakhstan) Astana, Kazakhstan^{e}; (Kazakhstan) Turkistan, Kazakhstan^{f}
- Largest city: Istanbul
- Official languages: Azerbaijani; Kazakh; Kyrgyz; Turkish; Uzbek
- Working languages: English
- Demonym: Turkic
- Type: Intergovernmental organization
- Membership: 5 member states: Azerbaijan; Kazakhstan; Kyrgyzstan; Turkey; Uzbekistan; 4 observers: Hungary; Northern Cyprus; Turkmenistan; Economic Cooperation Organization

Leaders
  - Secretary-General: (Uzbekistan) Mirvokhid Azimov
  - Chairman: (Turkey) Recep Tayyip Erdoğan
  - Honorary Chairman: (Kazakhstan) Nursultan Nazarbayev

Establishment
  - Nakhchivan Agreement: 3 October 2009
  - Last polity admitted: 12 November 2021

Area
  - Total: 4,242,362 km^{2} (1,637,985 sq mi) (unranked)

Population
  - 2026 estimate: 162,582,443
- GDP (PPP): 2026 estimate
  - Total: ▲$5.926 trillion
  - Per capita: ▲$36,470
- GDP (nominal): 2026 estimate
  - Total: ▲$2.284 trillion
  - Per capita: ▲$14,050
- Website turkicstates.org
- 1. Parliamentary Assembly; 2. Europe Office; 3. General Secretariat; 4. Regional Diaspora Center; 5. Turkic Academy; 6. Spiritual capital

The Organization of Turkic States (OTS), formerly called the Turkic Council or the Cooperation Council of Turkic Speaking States, is an intergovernmental organization comprising all but one of the internationally recognized Turkic sovereign states: Azerbaijan, Kazakhstan, Kyrgyzstan, Turkey, and Uzbekistan; while Hungary, Turkmenistan and Northern Cyprus are observers. Its overarching aim is promoting comprehensive cooperation among the Turkic peoples. First proposed by Kazakh president Nursultan Nazarbayev in 2006, it was founded on 3 October 2009 in Azerbaijan's Nakhchivan. The General Secretariat is located in Turkey's Istanbul.

In addition to Turkmenistan, the organization has also admitted Hungary and the Turkish Republic of Northern Cyprus as observers, although the latter is only recognized by Turkey.

During the 8th summit in Istanbul in 2021, the organization was restructured and adopted its current name.

== History ==
In 1991, with the emergence of five independent Turkic states—Azerbaijan, Kazakhstan, Kyrgyzstan, Uzbekistan, and Turkmenistan—on the international stage, intensive diplomatic engagements commenced among the six Turkic states. The first Summit of Turkic Speaking Countries was held in Ankara in 1992, and between 1994 and 2000, five summits of heads of state were organized. The 7th Summit took place in Istanbul in 2001, while the 8th Summit was convened in Antalya, Turkey after a hiatus of 5.5 years, following Turkish initiatives. The 9th Summit of Heads of State of Turkic Speaking Countries was held on 2–3 October 2009 in Nakhchivan, Azerbaijan. During this summit, within the framework of the Nakhchivan Agreement signed by Turkey, Azerbaijan, Kazakhstan, and Kyrgyzstan, the establishment of an international organization called the Cooperation Council of Turkic Speaking States (Turkic Council) was decided.

According to Halil Akıncı, the founding Secretary-General of the organization, the Turkic Council became the first voluntary alliance of Turkic states in history.

In 2012, the flag of the Turkic Council was adopted at its 2nd Summit, which took place in Bishkek on 23 August 2012, and officially raised on 12 October 2012. The flag combines the symbols of the four founding member states: the light blue color of the flag of Kazakhstan, which also evokes the traditional Turkic color of turquoise, the sun of the flag of Kyrgyzstan, the star of the flag of Azerbaijan, and the crescent of the Turkish flag.

On 30 April 2018, it was announced that Uzbekistan would join the Cooperation Council of Turkic-Speaking States and attend the upcoming summit of the organization in Bishkek. It formally applied for membership on 12 September 2019. Since late 2018, Hungary has been an observer and may request full membership. Turkmenistan received observer status in 2021. In November 2021, the organization was renamed the Organization of Turkic States. Its member states are increasingly focused on mutual security and strategic alignment positions. Local governments from 30 countries and regions are represented the Union of Municipalities of the Turkic World. The 6th Congress of the Union of Municipalities of the Turkic World was held in Istanbul on 10 June 2022. In 2022, the Turkish Republic of Northern Cyprus was admitted to the organization as an observer.

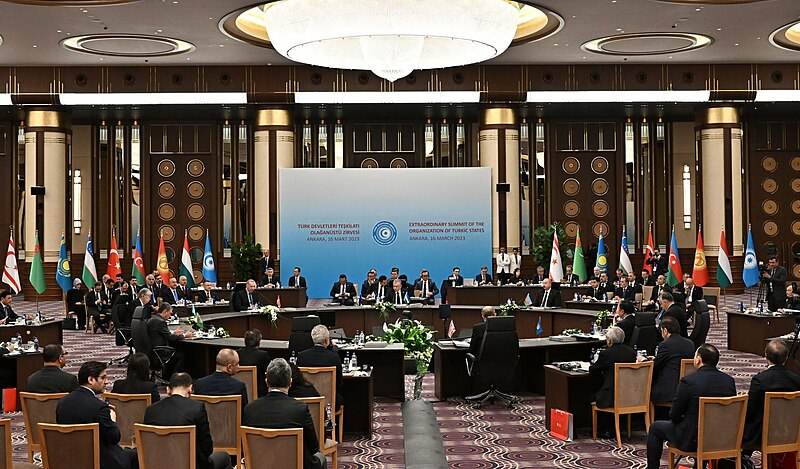
The Extraordinary Summit of the Heads of State of the Organization of Turkic States in Ankara in March 2023

In September 2024, it was reported that the Commission on the Common Alphabet of the Turkic World, which is an arm of the OTS, had agreed on a common alphabet of 34 letters based on the Latin alphabet in an effort to transition away from the Cyrillic which had been imposed when under Soviet rule. TURKPA member Professor Nizami Jafarov of Baku State University made the announcement. The project for a common Turkic alphabet based on Latin was first proposed in 1991 after the dissolution of the USSR.

== Purpose ==
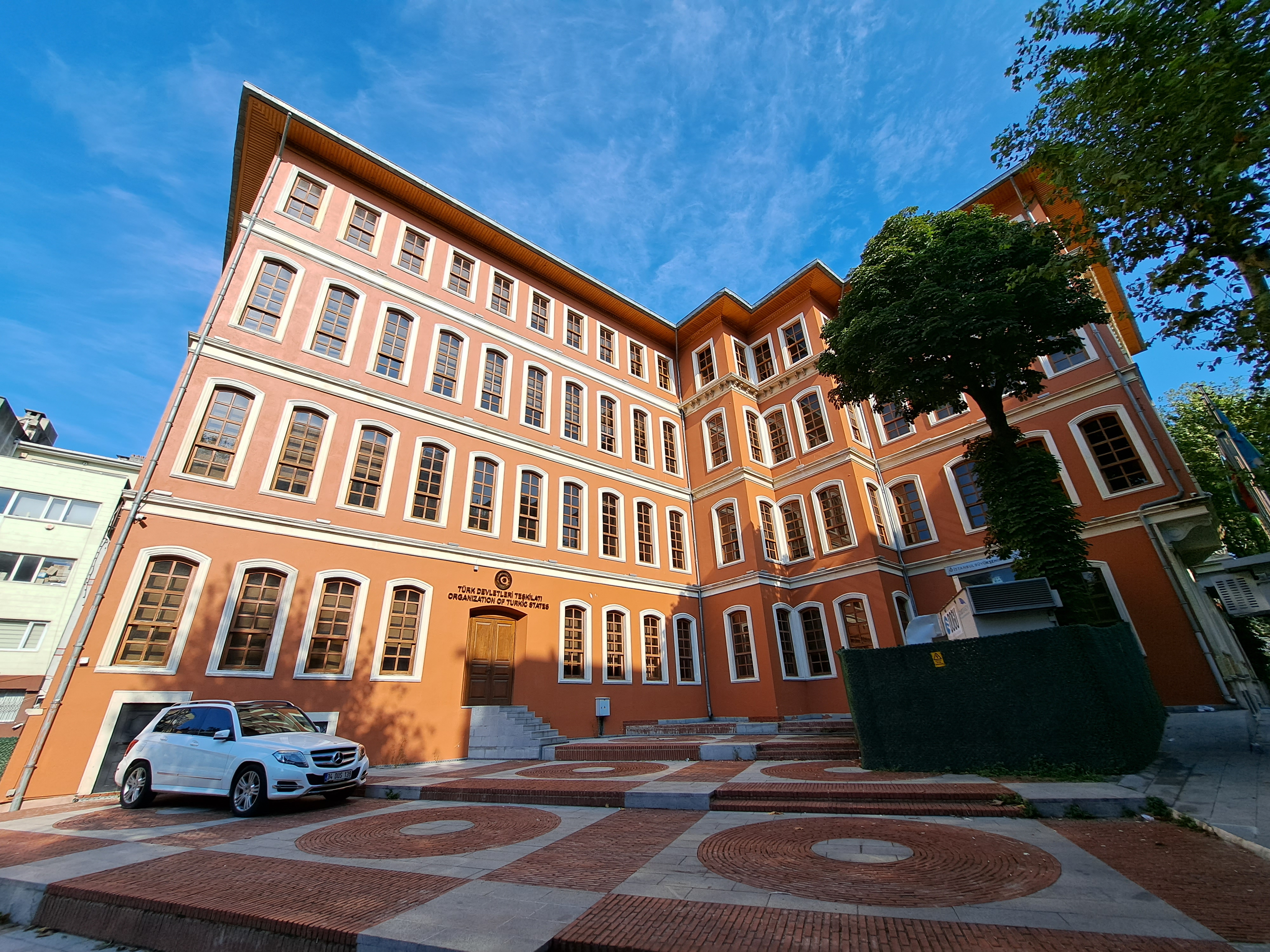
Headquarters of the Organization of Turkic States

Nominally, the Preamble of the Nakhchivan Agreement reaffirms the will of Member States to adhere to the purposes and principles enshrined in the Charter of the United Nations, and defines the main objective of the Organization of Turkic States as further deepening comprehensive cooperation among Turkic Speaking States, as well as making joint contributions to peace and stability in the region and in the world. Member States have nominally confirmed their commitment to democratic values, human rights, the rule of law, and principles of good governance.

The Nakhchivan Agreement sets out the main purposes and tasks of the Organization as follows:

- Strengthening mutual confidence and friendship among the Parties;
- Developing common positions on foreign policy issues;
- Coordinating actions to combat international terrorism, separatism, extremism and cross-border crimes;
- Promoting effective regional and bilateral cooperation in all areas of common interest;
- Creating favorable conditions for trade and investment;
- Aiming for comprehensive and balanced economic growth, social and cultural development;
- Expanding interaction in the fields of science, technology, education, health, culture, sports and tourism;
- Encouraging interaction of mass media and other means of communication;
- Strengthening cooperation and integration between member states;
- Promoting exchange of relevant legal information and enhancing legal cooperation.

== Structure and operation ==
Main organs of the Organization of Turkic States include:

- Council of Heads of State
- Council of Foreign Ministers
- Senior Officials Committee
- Council of Elders (Aksakals)
- The Secretariat

The main decision-making and governing body of the Organization of Turkic States is the Council of Heads of State, which is presided over by the President whose country holds the chairmanship. The chairmanship rotates on an annual basis. All activities of the Organization of Turkic States are coordinated and monitored by its Secretariat, which is located in Istanbul in accordance with the Nakhchivan Agreement. Presidents meet once a year in a previously determined Turkic city.

The Council of Elders serves as a permanent advisory body within the Organization of Turkic States and embodies the tradition of drawing wisdom and guidance from forebears, a practice rooted in Turkic cultures. At the 8th Summit held in Istanbul, the regulations governing the council were renewed by the Heads of State to enhance its effectiveness, reflecting the commitment to benefit from the experiences of elder members.

Senior officials, Aksakals, as well as other Ministers and government officials, all meet on a regular basis.

=== Affiliated bodies and organizations ===
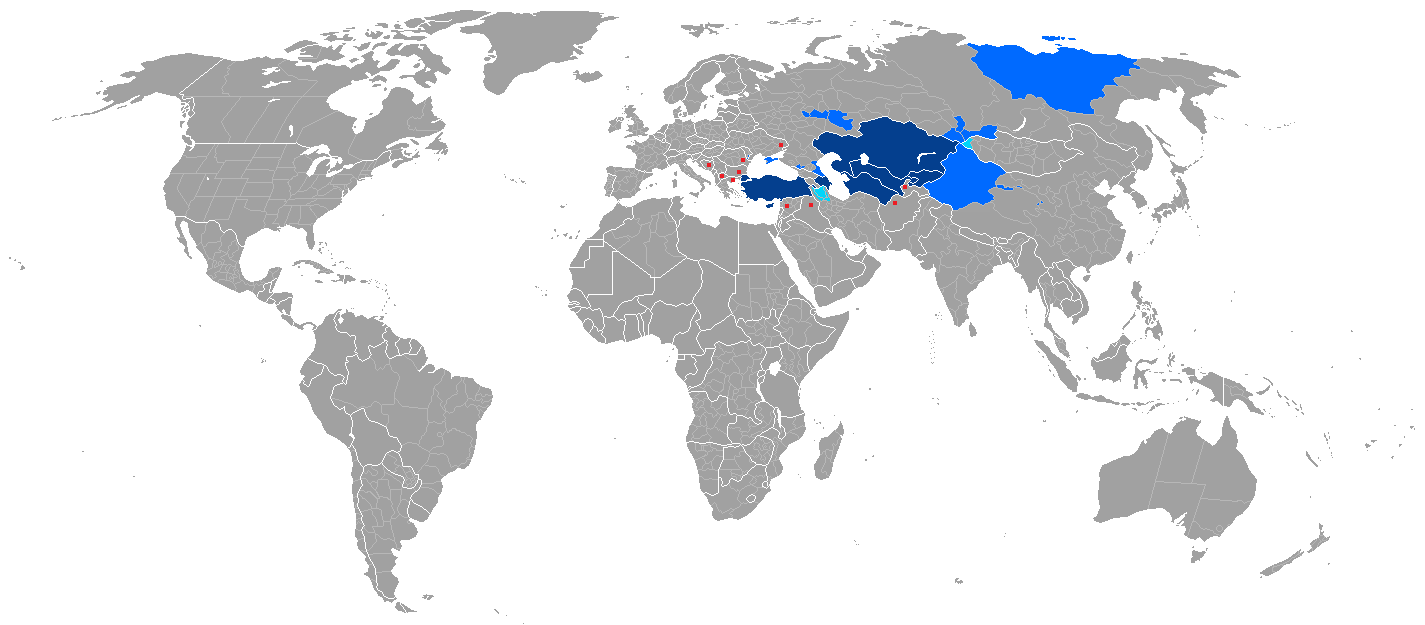
The Turkic-speaking areas

OTS functions as an umbrella for organizations like:

- the Parliamentary Assembly of Turkic States (TURKPA) (administrative capital in Baku)
- the International Organization of Turkic Culture (TURKSOY) (administrative capital in Ankara)
- the Turkic Academy (administrative capital in Astana)
- Turkic Culture and Heritage Foundation (administrative capital in Baku)
- Center of Nomadic Civilizations (administrative capital in Bishkek)
- Turkic Business Council (administrative capital in Istanbul)
- the Turkic Investment Fund

=== International cooperation ===
OTS is an observer at the Economic Cooperation Organization and has also applied for an observer status at the UN and the Organisation of Islamic Cooperation. Besides, OTS maintains close cooperative relations with the Organization for Security and Co-operation in Europe and the Conference on Interaction and Confidence-Building Measures in Asia.

== Projects ==
Since its founding agreement defines comprehensive cooperation among Turkic states as the organization's main objective and raison d'être, the Organization of Turkic States is working on a variety of projects. The projects are grouped under six cooperation processes, which are: economy, culture, education, transport, customs, and diaspora. Examples of the projects include establishing the Turkic University Union and writing a common history textbook. The Organization of Turkic States also works on ways to boost economic development in underdeveloped regions of Member States. The Secretariat brings together Economy Ministers, Education Ministers, Transport Ministers, Heads of Customs Administrations, and other senior officials from different ministries and agencies in order to work on ways to promote cooperation in relevant spheres. Prior to being brought before ministers and heads of administrations, projects and issues of cooperation are elaborated by working groups. One recently launched project is the establishment of a mechanism for closer cooperation among Turkic diasporas all over the world.

=== Joint investment fund ===
In November 2020, Kyrgyz Minister of Foreign Affairs Ruslan Kazakbaev pointed that Organization of Turkic States members have to strengthen their economic relations, they have to establish a joint investment fund and build its center on Kyrgyzstan on his meeting with Turkish Minister Mevlüt Çavuşoğlu. Baghdad Amreyev visited Minister of Treasury and Finance of Turkey Lütfi Elvan and sides talked about establishment of Joint Investment Fund. In September 2021, on meeting of Turkic ministers responsible for the economy, sides negotiated about a Turkic Joint Investment Fund feasibility work and agreement to establish the fund.

=== Common Alphabet ===
In September 2022, on the occasion of the 90th anniversary of the Language Festival, the Organization of Turkic States decided to establish a "Common Alphabet Commission" within the body of OTS for a unified alphabet of the Turkic world. During the event, scientists from the Turkic states gave information about the alphabets and historical processes used in their own countries, and thus it was emphasized that the transition processes to the common alphabet should be accelerated, and the application should be widespread. The commission, which will hold its first meeting in Kyrgyzstan, will observe the work of the common alphabet and report to the Council of Elders.

=== Simplified Customs Corridor ===
On 11 November 2022, in the city of Samarkand, the member countries of the Organization of Turkic States signed an agreement "On the establishment of simplified customs corridor". Azerbaijan was the first member country to enact the agreement, in May 2023 the Azerbaijani President Ilham Aliyev signed a law creating the simplified customs corridor.

== Summits ==
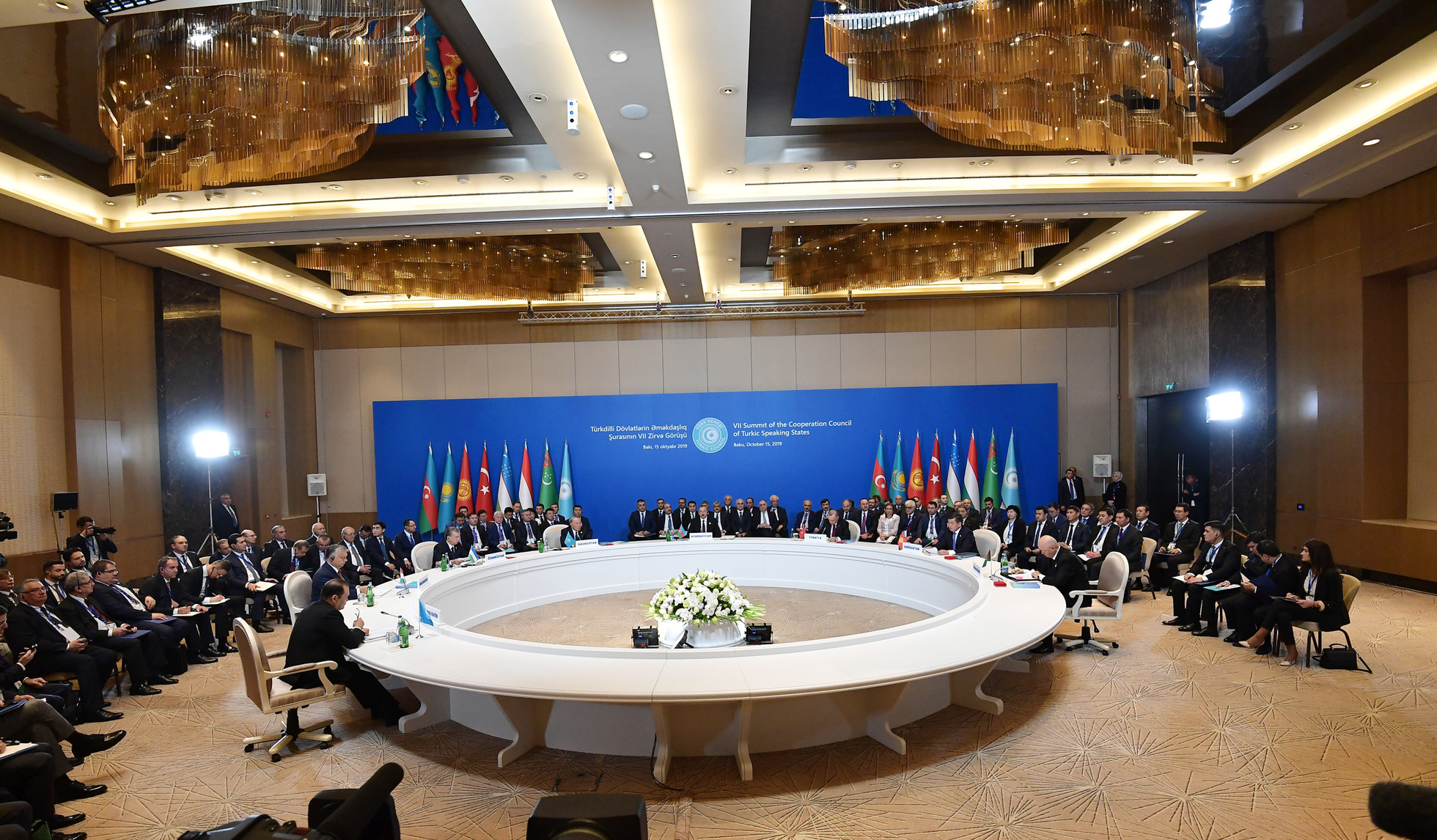
7th Summit of Cooperation Council of Turkic-Speaking States in Baku

Following the dissolution of the Soviet Union, the newly independent Turkic States of Azerbaijan, Kazakhstan, Kyrgyzstan, Turkmenistan and Uzbekistan as well as Turkey organized Summits of the Heads of Turkic Speaking States, the first of which took place in 1992 in Ankara. With the establishment of Turkic Council, at the 10th Summit it was decided to rename the top-level meetings to Turkic Council Summits.

The Turkic Council Summit is the highlight of the year whereby Heads of State evaluate outcomes of the past period and set goals for the next year. The First Summit took place in Almaty, Kazakhstan, on 20–21 October 2011 and focused primarily on economic cooperation. The Second Summit was held in Bishkek, Kyrgyzstan, on 22–23 August 2012 and concentrated on educational, scientific, and cultural cooperation. The Third Summit took place on 15–16 August 2013 in Qabala, Azerbaijan with a theme of transport and connectivity.

On 15 October 2019, the Seventh Turkic Council Summit was organized in Baku with the participation of Presidents of member states Ilham Aliyev, Sooronbai Jeenbekov, Recep Tayyip Erdoğan, Shavkat Mirziyoyev, as well as Purli Agamyradov as a guest, Viktor Orban as an observer and heads of Turkic cooperation institutions. The participants celebrated the 10th anniversary of the Nakhchivan Agreement on the establishment of the Turkic Council in addition to Uzbekistan's joining the organization as a full-fledged member. The title of Honorary Chairman of the Turkic Council was given to the former President of Kazakhstan Nursultan Nazarbayev. In the conclusion of the Summit, the Heads of States signed the Baku Declaration. Besides, the presidency in the Council officially passed to Azerbaijan.

At the 8th Summit of the Organization of Turkic States (OTS), held on November 12, 2021, the Heads of State adopted the "Turkic World Vision 2040” document. This document delineates the objectives, priorities, and operational principles of the OTS, aiming to enhance political, economic, cultural, scientific, and technological cooperation among its member states.

The Twelfth Summit of the Organization of Turkic States (OTS) was held in Gabala on 7 October 2025, hosted by the President of the Republic of Azerbaijan, Ilham Aliyev, under the theme "Regional Peace and Security". During the summit, leaders signed the "Gabala Declaration", which introduced the "OTS+" format to institutionalize cooperation with non-member partner states. Additionally, marking a significant step in defense collaboration, the member states agreed to conduct the organization's first joint military exercises in 2026.

At the Gabala Summit, Kyrgyzstan handed over the Chairmanship-in-Office of the Organization to Azerbaijan. Azerbaijan will hold the Chairmanship until the next Summit, which will be held in Türkiye in 2026. The Informal Summit of the Organization is scheduled to take place in Kazakhstan in 2026.

=== Extraordinary Summit ===
The Extraordinary Summit of the Turkic Council focused on the fight against the COVID-19 pandemic was conducted through videoconferencing by the initiative of the chairman of the organization Ilham Aliyev on 10 April 2020. The conference titled "Cooperation and solidarity in the fight against the COVID-19 pandemic" was held with the participation of the Director-General of the World Health Organization, Tedros Adhanom Ghebreyesus along with the heads of states of the member countries. Participants discussed the measures taken at the national level to fight against the coronavirus epidemic, to improve multilateral cooperation in the field of healthcare, and to undertake the common challenges caused by the outbreak of COVID-19. Exchanging views on the ways of overcoming negative effects of coronavirus on the national and global economies, they touched upon trade relations and continuous transportation, and they entrusted the Ministries of Commerce and Transport of the member States with reviewing the process via videoconferencing and with presenting practical solutions for the free flow of goods among Turkic Council states across the Trans-Caspian Corridor. An 18-point list of mutual priorities of all member nations was outlined in the Baku Declaration.

== Members ==
=== Current ===
| Country | Accession | Population | Area (km^{2}) | GDP ( $) | GDP per capita ($) | Human Development Index |
|---|---|---|---|---|---|---|
| Azerbaijan | Founder | 10,353,296 | 86,600 | 78,372 billion | 7,503 | 0.789 |
| Kazakhstan | Founder | 20,495,975 | 2,724,900 | 360,456 billion | 17,503 | 0.837 |
| Kyrgyzstan | Founder | 7,404,300 | 199,900 | 23,606 billion | 3,202 | 0.720 |
| Turkey | Founder | 86,092,168 | 783,562 | 1,640 trillion | 19,020 | 0.855 |
| Uzbekistan | 2019 | 38,236,704 | 447,400 | 181,502 billion | 4,661 | 0.740 |
| Organization of Turkic States | | 162.582.443 | 4,242,362 | 2,284 trillion | 14,050 | 0.806 |

=== Observers ===
| Country | Accession | Population | Area (km^{2}) | GDP ( $) | GDP per capita ($) | Human Development Index |
|---|---|---|---|---|---|---|
| Hungary | 2018 | 9,540,000 | 93,030 | 237,070 billion | 24,809 | 0.870 |
| Turkmenistan | 2021 | 7,057,841 | 491,210 | 89,054 billion | 13,338 | 0.764 |
| Northern Cyprus | 2022 | 476,214 | 3,355 | 7,075 billion | 15,835 | - |

Additionally, Economic Cooperation Organization has been granted an observer status in 2023, making Iran, Pakistan and Tajikistan indirect observers.

==== Possible future members and observers ====
In 2020, Ukrainian Deputy Foreign Minister Emine Ceppar, who is of Crimean Tatar descent, stated Ukraine wanted to be an observer. Crimea is the homeland of the Crimean Tatars.

Turkish Minister of Foreign Affairs Mevlüt Çavuşoğlu announced that Turkmenistan, currently an observer state, could become a full member during the 2022 Organization of Turkic States summit.

During the 2026 Ankara summit, Kazakh president Kassym-Jomart Tokayev invited Russia to be an observer. In response to the invitation, Russian spokesperson Dmitry Peskov supported Russian participation.

==== Former applicants ====
On 3 May 2021, the Islamic Republic of Afghanistan officially applied for observer status. However, with its overthrow by the Taliban and the re-establishment of the Islamic Emirate of Afghanistan in August that year, the status of its application for observer status is uncertain.

== Events ==
| # | Date | Location | | Notes | Participation | | | | | | | |
|---|---|---|---|---|---|---|---|---|---|---|---|---|
| Turkic Speaking States Summits | | | | | (Azerbaijan) | (Kazakhstan) | (Kyrgyzstan) | (Turkey) | (Turkmenistan) | (Uzbekistan) | (Hungary) | (Northern Cyprus) |
| I | 30 October 1992 | Turkey | Ankara | First Turkic Speaking States Summit | H | H | H | H | H | H | —N/a | —N/a |
| — | 12 July 1993 | Kazakhstan | Almaty | The Almaty Agreement for founding TURKSOY | O | O | O | O | O | O | —N/a | —N/a |
| II | 18 October 1994 | Turkey | Istanbul | Second Turkic Speaking States Summit | H | H | H | H | H | H | —N/a | —N/a |
| III | 28 August 1995 | Kyrgyzstan | Bishkek | Third Turkic Speaking States Summit | H | H | H | H | H | H | —N/a | —N/a |
| IV | 21 October 1996 | Uzbekistan | Tashkent | Fourth Turkic Speaking States Summit | H | H | H | H | H | H | —N/a | —N/a |
| V | 9 June 1998 | Kazakhstan | Astana | Fifth Turkic Speaking States Summit | H | H | H | H | H | H | —N/a | —N/a |
| VI | 8 April 2000 | Azerbaijan | Baku | Sixth Turkic Speaking States Summit | H | H | H | H | H | H | —N/a | —N/a |
| VII | 26 April 2001 | Turkey | Istanbul | Seventh Turkic Speaking States Summit | H | H | H | H | H | O | —N/a | —N/a |
| VIII | 17 November 2006 | Turkey | Antalya | Eighth Turkic Speaking States Summit | H | H | H | H | O | No | —N/a | —N/a |
| — | 21 November 2008 | Turkey | Istanbul | The Istanbul Agreement for founding TURKPA | O | O | O | O | No | No | —N/a | —N/a |
| IX | 3 October 2009 | Azerbaijan | Nakhchivan | Ninth Turkic Speaking States Summit, the Nakhchivan Agreement for founding the Turkic Council | H | H | H | H | O | No | —N/a | —N/a |
| X | 15 September 2010 | Turkey | Istanbul | Tenth Turkic Speaking States Summit (The end of Non-Corporate Summits of Turkic-Speaking Countries State) | H | H | H | H | H | No | —N/a | —N/a |
| Turkic Council Summits | | | | | (Azerbaijan) | (Kazakhstan) | (Kyrgyzstan) | (Turkey) | (Turkmenistan) | (Uzbekistan) | (Hungary) | (Northern Cyprus) |
| I | 21 October 2011 | Kazakhstan | Almaty | First Turkic Council Summit, Cooperation in Economic Area and Trade Area | H | H | H | O | —N/a | —N/a | —N/a | —N/a |
| II | 23 August 2012 | Kyrgyzstan | Bishkek | Second Turkic Council Summit, Cooperation in Education, Science and Culture | H | H | H | H | —N/a | —N/a | —N/a | —N/a |
| III | 16 August 2013 | Azerbaijan | Qabala | Third Turkic Council Summit, Cooperation in Transportation | H | H | H | H | —N/a | —N/a | —N/a | —N/a |
| IV | 5 June 2014 | Turkey | Bodrum | Fourth Turkic Council Summit, Cooperation in Tourism | H | H | H | H | H | —N/a | —N/a | —N/a |
| — | 24 December 2014 | Ukraine | Kyiv | Opening of the first Turkic Council Regional Diaspora Center | O | O | O | O | —N/a | —N/a | —N/a | —N/a |
| V | 11 September 2015 | Kazakhstan | Astana | Fifth Turkic Council Summit, Cooperation in Media and Information | H | H | H | O | O | —N/a | —N/a | —N/a |
| VI | 2 September 2018 | Kyrgyzstan | Cholpon-Ata | Sixth Turkic Council Summit | H | H | H | H | —N/a | H | H | —N/a |
| VII | 15 October 2019 | Azerbaijan | Baku | Seventh Turkic Council Summit | H | H | H | H | O | H | H | —N/a |
| — | 10 April 2020 | Teleconference | | Extraordinary Video Summit | H | H | H | H | H | H | H | —N/a |
| — | 31 March 2021 | Teleconference | | Informal Video Summit | H | H | H | H | H | H | H | —N/a |
| VIII | 12 November 2021 | Turkey | Istanbul | Eighth Turkic Council Summit, Organization of Turkic States name is adopted | H | H | H | H | H | H | H | —N/a |
| Organization of Turkic States Summits | | | | | (Azerbaijan) | (Kazakhstan) | (Kyrgyzstan) | (Turkey) | (Turkmenistan) | (Uzbekistan) | (Hungary) | (Northern Cyprus) |
| IX | 11 November 2022 | Uzbekistan | Samarkand | First OTS Summit | H | H | H | H | O | H | H | —N/a |
| — | 16 March 2023 | Turkey | Ankara | Extraordinary Summit | H | H | H | H | O | H | H | H |
| X | 3 November 2023 | Kazakhstan | Astana | Second OTS Summit | H | H | H | H | O | H | H | No |
| — | 6 July 2024 | Azerbaijan | Shusha | Informal Summit | H | H | H | O | No | H | H | H |
| XI | 6 November 2024 | Kyrgyzstan | Bishkek | Third OTS Summit | H | H | H | H | O | H | H | H |
| — | 21 May 2025 | Hungary | Budapest | Informal Summit | H | H | H | H | No | H | H | No |
| XII | 7 October 2025 | Azerbaijan | Gabala | Fourth OTS Summit | H | H | H | H | O | H | H | H |
| — | 15 May 2026 | Kazakhstan | Turkistan | Informal Summit | H | H | H | H | No | H | No | H |
| XIII | 30 October 2026 | Turkey | Ankara | Fifth OTS Summit | O | H | H | H | H | H | No | H |
| — | 6 August 2027 | Kyrgyzstan | Cholpon-Ata | Informal Summit | | | | | | | | |
| XIV | Fall 2027 | Uzbekistan | | Fourteenth OTS Summit | | | | | | | | |

H Head of state or government attended.
O Other officials attended.
No attendees.
- Not a member/observer yet.

== List of secretaries-general ==
| No. | Name | Country of origin | Took office | Left office |
|---|---|---|---|---|
| 1 | Halil Akıncı | Turkey | 15 September 2010 | 16 September 2014 |
| 2 | Ramil Hasan | Azerbaijan | 16 September 2014 | 3 September 2018 |
| 3 | Baghdad Amreyev | Kazakhstan | 3 September 2018 | 11 November 2022 |
| 4 | Kubanychbek Omuraliev | Kyrgyzstan | 11 November 2022 | 30 October 2026 |
| 5 | Mirvokhid Azimov | Uzbekistan | 30 October 2026 | incumbent |

== List of chairmen ==
According to article 8 of the Nakhchivan Agreement, the state that hosts the regular summit, will assume the chairmanship until next meeting.

| No. | Name | Country of origin | Took office | Left office |
|---|---|---|---|---|
| 1 | Nursultan Nazarbayev | Kazakhstan | 21 October 2011 | 23 August 2012 |
| 2 | Almazbek Atambayev | Kyrgyzstan | 23 August 2012 | 16 August 2013 |
| 3 | Ilham Aliyev | Azerbaijan | 16 August 2013 | 5 June 2014 |
| 4 | Abdullah Gül | Turkey | 5 June 2014 | 28 August 2014 |
| 5 | Recep Tayyip Erdoğan | Turkey | 28 August 2014 | 11 September 2015 |
| (1) | Nursultan Nazarbayev | Kazakhstan | 11 September 2015 | 3 September 2018 |
| 6 | Sooronbay Jeenbekov | Kyrgyzstan | 3 September 2018 | 15 October 2019 |
| (3) | Ilham Aliyev | Azerbaijan | 15 October 2019 | 12 November 2021 |
| (5) | Recep Tayyip Erdoğan | Turkey | 12 November 2021 | 11 November 2022 |
| 7 | Shavkat Mirziyoyev | Uzbekistan | 11 November 2022 | 3 November 2023 |
| 8 | Kassym-Jomart Tokayev | Kazakhstan | 3 November 2023 | 6 November 2024 |
| 9 | Sadyr Japarov | Kyrgyzstan | 6 November 2024 | 7 October 2025 |
| (3) | Ilham Aliyev | Azerbaijan | 7 October 2025 | 30 October 2026 |
| (5) | Recep Tayyip Erdoğan | Turkey | 30 October 2026 | incumbent |

== Leaders of member states ==
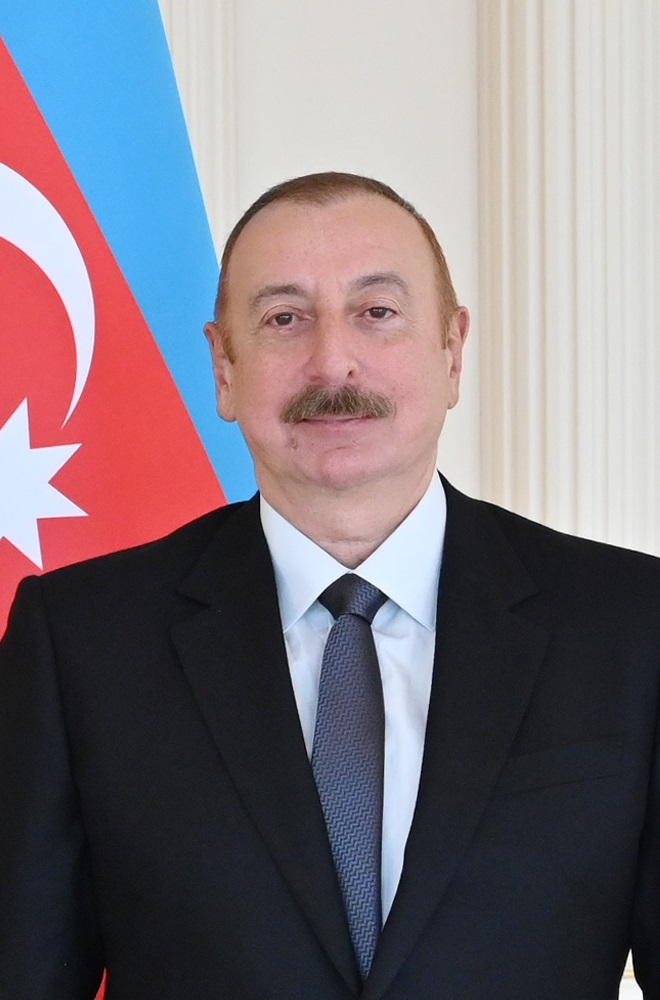
Republic of Azerbaijan
Ilham Aliyev
President of Azerbaijan

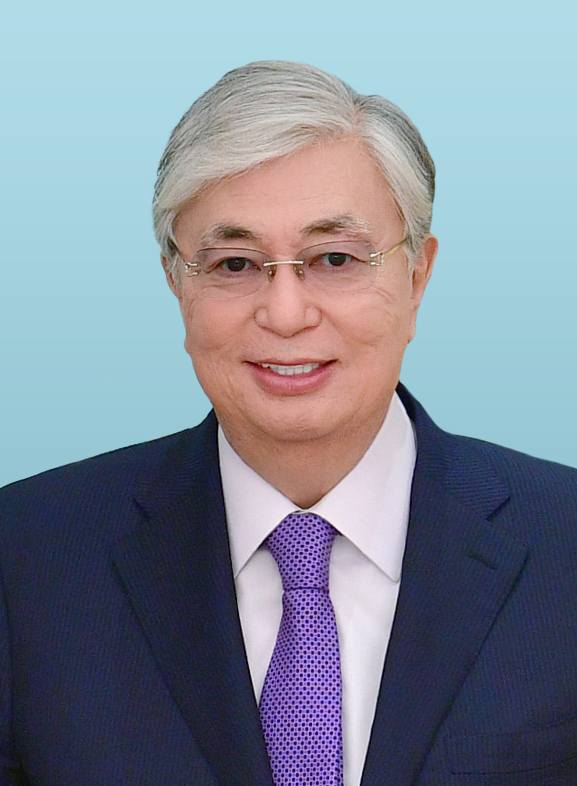
Republic of Kazakhstan
Kassym-Jomart Tokayev
President of Kazakhstan

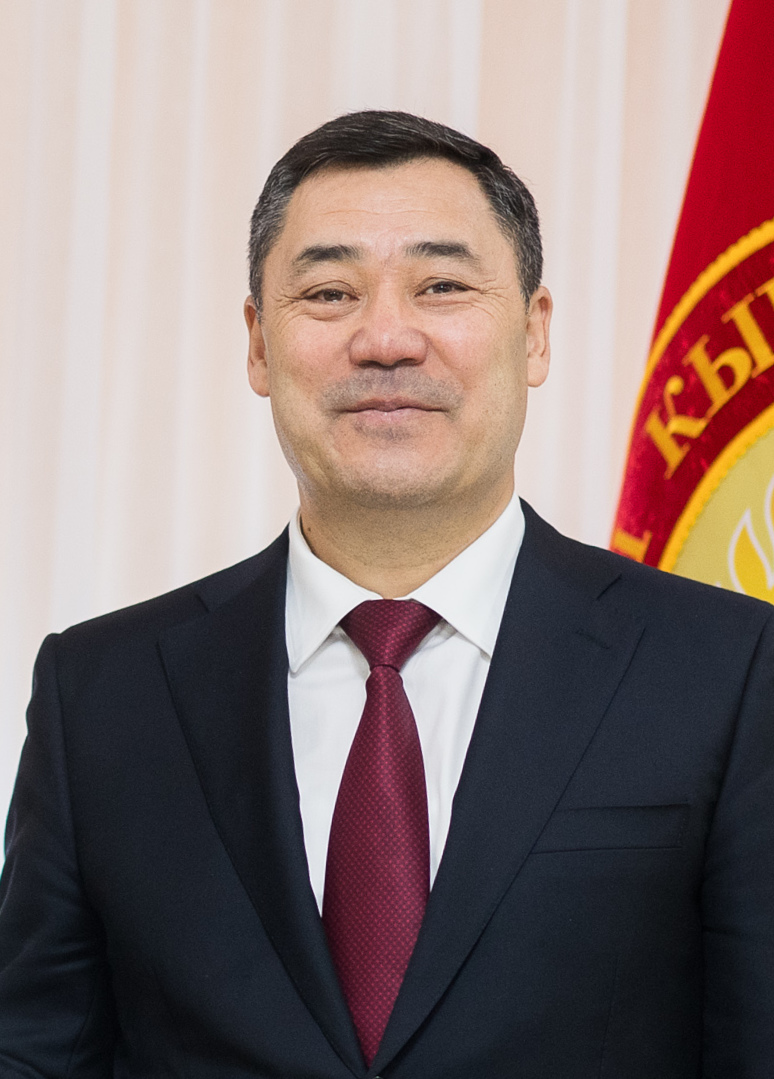
Kyrgyz Republic
Sadyr Japarov
President of Kyrgyzstan

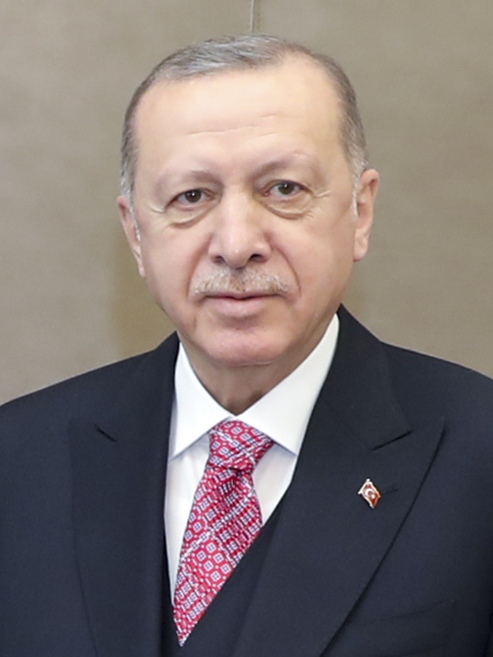
Republic of Turkey
Recep Tayyip Erdoğan
President of Turkey

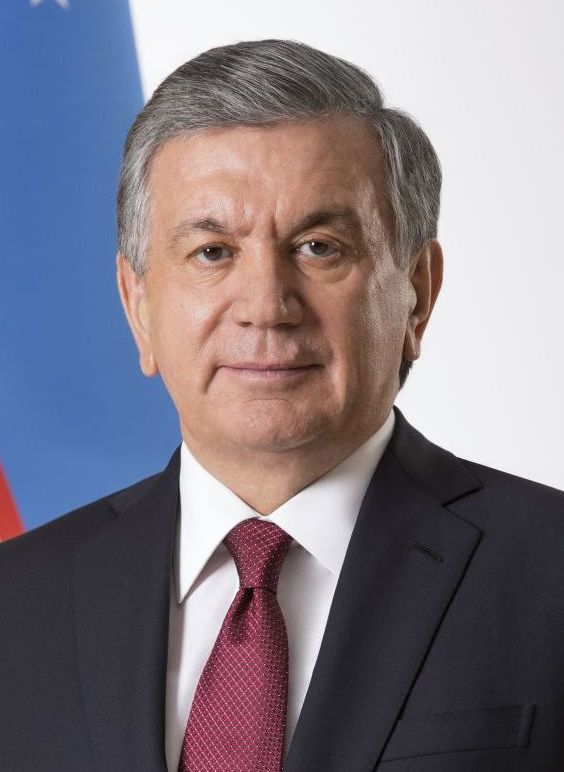
Republic of Uzbekistan
Shavkat Mirziyoyev
President of Uzbekistan

== See also ==
- Azerbaijan–Organization of Turkic States relations
- List of international organizations based in Istanbul
- World Turks Qurultai

By ISO 639-3 code
Enter an ISO code to find the corresponding language article.
