= Supreme Order of Turkic World =

Highest order of the Organization of Turkic States

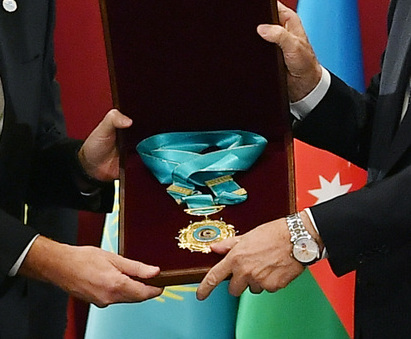

Awarded by Organization of Turkic States
- Type: Service medal
- Established: 2019
- Criteria: Distinguished merits
- Status: Currently constituted

Statistics
- First induction: Nursultan Nazarbayev
- Last induction: Sadyr Japarov
- Total inductees: 7
- Ribbon bar

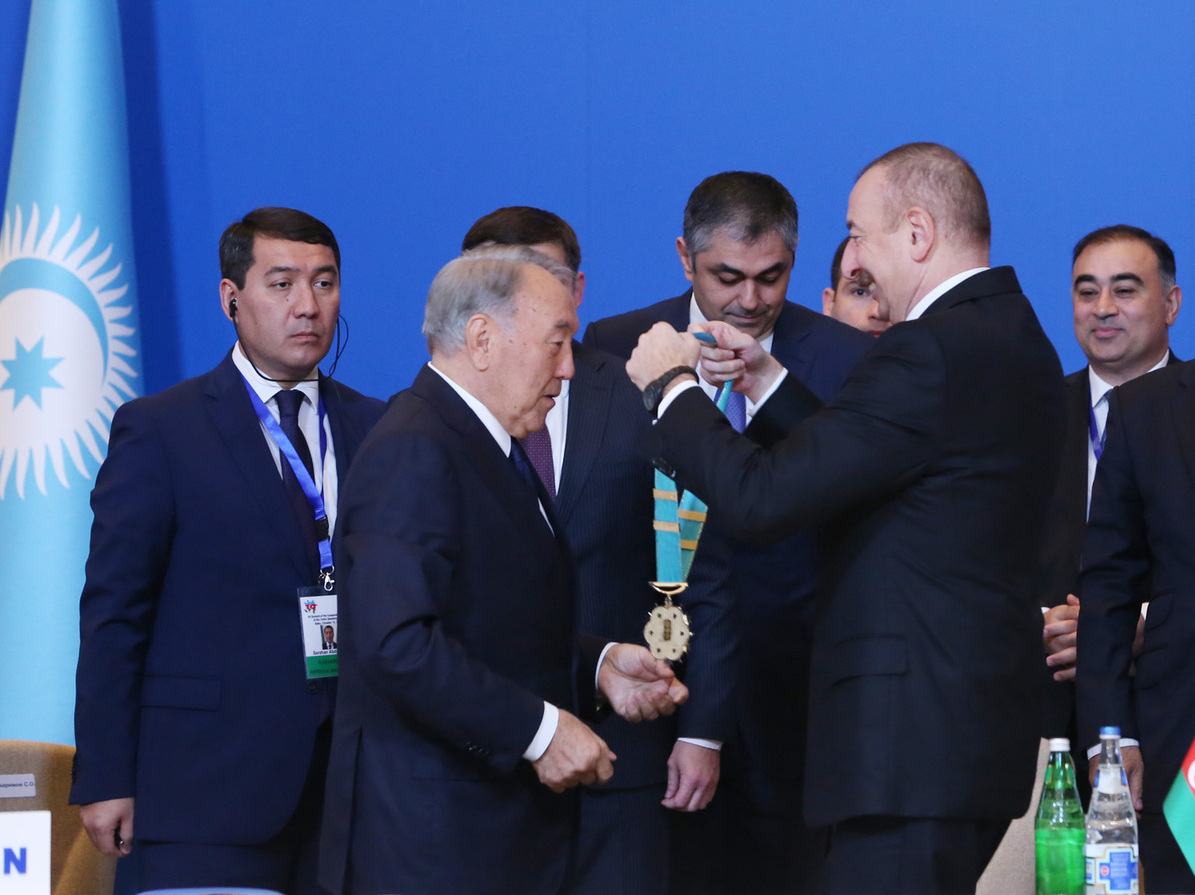
President Nursultan Nazarbayev receiving the Supreme Order of the Turkic World from the chairperson. (2019)

The Supreme Order of Turkic World is the highest order of the Organization of Turkic States. The order is awarded by the chairperson of the organization, who is simultaneously the head of state or head of government of one of the member countries. Established in 2019, the order recognizes outstanding service to the Turkic World.

== Design ==
The order is designed by Azerbaijani artist Adam Yunisov. It is entirely handmade. The design of the order consists of 6 pieces of octagonal stars representing the 6 Turkic States gathered around a large circle around the emblem of the Organization of Turkic States. Eight levels of gold and diamonds make up the Supreme Order of the Turkic World. Each of the six stars has a diamond at the top, signifying the Turkic State's bright future and rich cultural history. The arrangement is made up of eight interlocking layers of gold. Along with four gold pieces and additional gold connectors on the pendant, 400 grams of gold were utilized in the production.

The large diamonds are surrounded by 18 smaller diamonds as symbolization of the brightness that the Turkic world illuminates. The hexagonal star in the centre represents the power of the Turkic world. In the middle of the order is also the insignia of the organization, which is entirely painted with handcrafted enamel.

== Recipients ==
	Date	Portrait	Name	Title	Ref
1	15 October 2019		Nursultan Nazarbayev	President of Kazakhstan	
2	12 November 2021		Ilham Aliyev	President of Azerbaijan	
3	11 November 2022		Recep Tayyip Erdoğan	President of Turkey	
4	11 November 2022		Gurbanguly Berdimuhamedow	Chairman of the People's Council of Turkmenistan	
5	3 November 2023		Shavkat Mirziyoyev	President of Uzbekistan	
6	6 November 2024		Viktor Orbán	Prime Minister of Hungary	
7	29 October 2026		Sadyr Japarov	President of Kyrgyzstan	

== See also ==
- Orders, decorations, and medals of Azerbaijan
- Orders, decorations, and medals of Kazakhstan
- Orders, decorations, and medals of Kyrgyzstan
- Orders, decorations, and medals of Turkey
- Orders, decorations, and medals of Turkmenistan
- Orders, decorations, and medals of Uzbekistan
