= Association of Secretaries General of Parliaments =

The Association of Secretaries General of Parliaments is an international association which associates the top civil servants of National Parliaments of over 150 countries in the world. Membership is destined to the secretaries general and clerks and the deputy secretaries general and deputy clerks of (Houses of) Parliaments (Upper House and Lower House).

The association, founded in 1939, is a consultative mechanism of the Interparliamentary Union in accordance with Section VIII, Article 27 of the Statutes of the Union.

It aims:

- to facilitate personal contacts between its members
- in conjunction with the Inter-Parliamentary Union, to cooperate with those parliaments which request legal and technical assistance and support
- to study the law, practice and procedure of Parliament
- to propose measures for improving the working methods of the different parliaments
- to secure co-operation between the services of different parliaments

Members of the association publish communications which deal with constitutional, legal, organisational, financial, communicative and administrative aspects of the work of Parliaments, and theoretical and practical aspects of democracy and the rule of law. These publications are accessible on the association' website.
