= Kubanychbek Omuraliev =

Kyrgyz diplomat

- Кубанычбек Өмүралиев
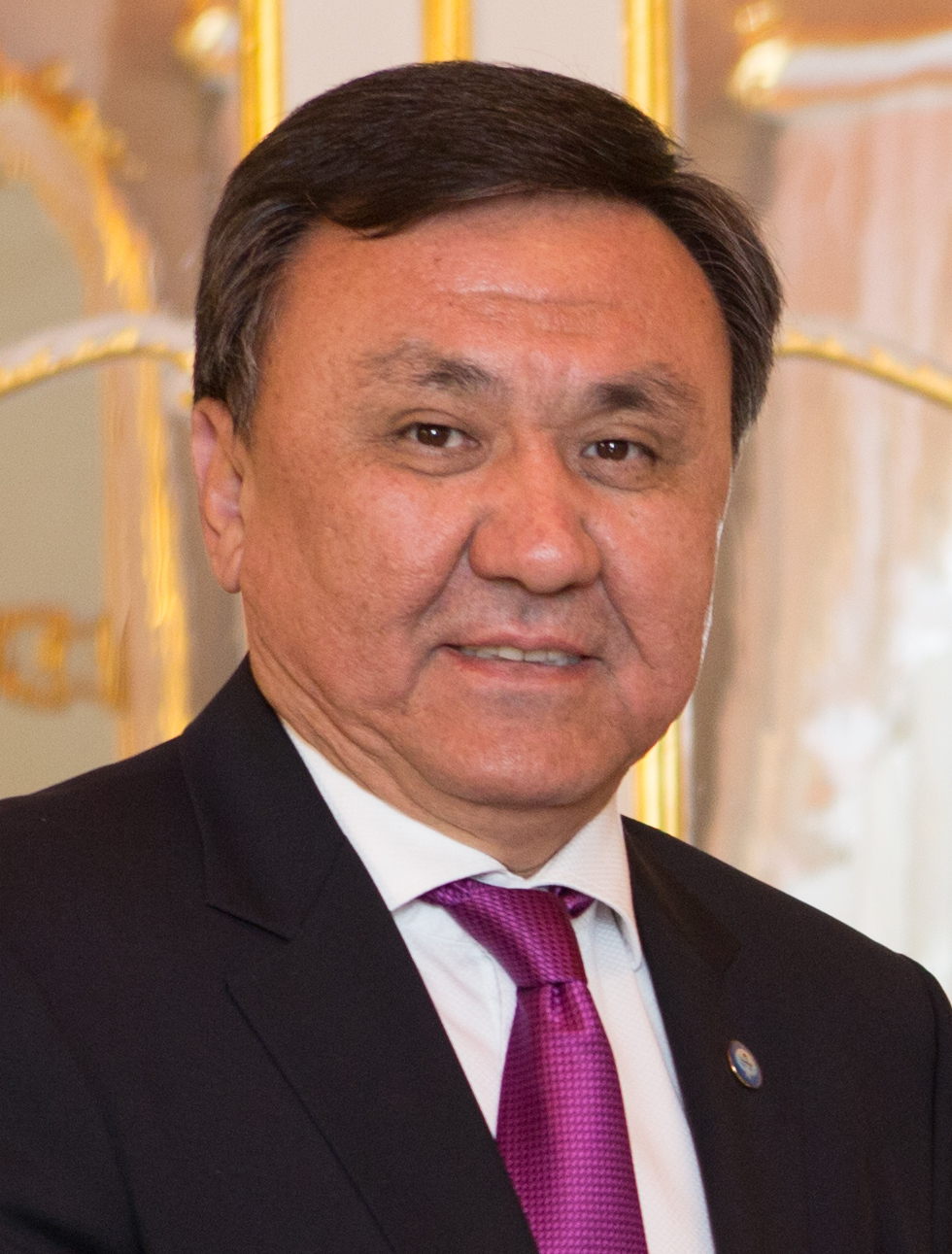
- Omuraliev in 2016

4th Secretary-General of the Organization of Turkic States
- Incumbent
- Assumed office 11 November 2022-30 October 2026
- Honorary President: Nursultan Nazarbayev
- Preceded by: Baghdad Amreyev
- Succeeded by: Mirvokhid Azimov

Personal details
- Born: 15 September 1960 (age 66) Tong District, Issyk-Kul Region, Kirghiz SSR, USSR

Kubanychbek Kasymovich Omuraliev (Kyrgyz: Кубанычбек Касымович Өмүралиев, romanized: Kasymovich Kubanychbek Ömüraliev, born 15 September 1960) is a Kyrgyz diplomat and ambassador. He is the Secretary-General of the Organization of Turkic States since 2022.

== Early life and career ==
He was born on 15 September 1960 in the Tong District, Issyk-Kul Region. Omuraliev graduated from the Kyrgyz National Agrarian University with a degree in mechanical engineering in 1984, and the became deputy director of the Agribusiness Company Issyk, where he served until 1990. From 1990–1992, he was Director of the Department of Foreign Economic Relations from the Ministry of Agriculture, Water Resources and Regional Development. In 1994 he completed the postgraduate studies at the Moscow Institute of Industrial Property with a degree in economics and between 1993 and 1996, he followed internships at universities such as the Texas A&M University, the University of Nebraska, the University of Washington and the Seoul National University. Afterwards, Omuraliev enjoyed diplomatic internships in Belgium, Luxembourg, France, Egypt, and the United States. Omuraliev was the vice-chair of the Federation of Business Circles of Kyrgyz Republic between 1995 and 1997. He then became a member of the Kyrgyz – American Business Council. Between 1992 and 1997, he served as the General Director of KyrgyzAgroImpex.

In 2003, he became the national coordinator of the Anti-Corruption Network for Economies in Transition (ACN) and the OECD. From 2003 to 2006, he did an internship on studying the legal and institutional framework for combating corruption in countries such as Singapore, Hong Kong, Norway, Slovenia and Lithuania.

== Diplomatic career ==
He transitioned into a diplomatic career within the Ministry of Foreign Affairs, serving the Deputy Director of the Department of Western Countries (1997–1998) and subsequently as the Director of the Department of Economic Policy (1998–1999). From 1999 to 2003, he held a diplomatic posting as the Minister-Counselor and Deputy Chief of Mission to the United States and Canada. Upon returning to Kyrgyzstan, he shifted his focus toward national governance and anti-corruption initiatives. He was a member of the Public Advisory Council for the Ministry of Foreign Affairs from 2011 to 2012.

=== Ambassadorial roles ===
In 2012, he became Consul general of the Kyrgyz Republic to the United Arab Emirates. Then, from 2015 he served in an array of ambassador roles in Belarus (until 2019), The Baltic States (2016–2019), Turkey (2019–2022), and Israel (2021–2022). While in Minsk, he was Permanent representative of the Kyrgyz Republic to the Commonwealth of Independent States.

== Organization of Turkic States ==
He became Secretary General of the Organization of Turkic States on 11 November 2022.

== Personal life ==
Omuraliev is fluent in Kyrgyz, Russian, English and Turkish. He is married and the father of two children.

== Honours ==
- Honorary Citizen of City of Houston, Texas (2003)
- Certificate of Honor of the Kyrgyz Republic (2006)
- Anniversary Medal "70 years of the Ministry of Foreign Affairs of the Kyrgyz Republic" (2014)
- The Certificate of Honor of the Commonwealth of Independent States (2017)
- Medal of the "International Club of Chingiz Aitmatov" (2018)
- Anniversary Medal "75 years of the Ministry of Foreign Affairs of the Kyrgyz Republic" (2019)
- Medal of the International Organization of Turkic Culture "Chingiz Aitmatov" (2020)
- Most Successful Ambassador of 2021, Turkey (2022)
