= List of Turkic Council summits =

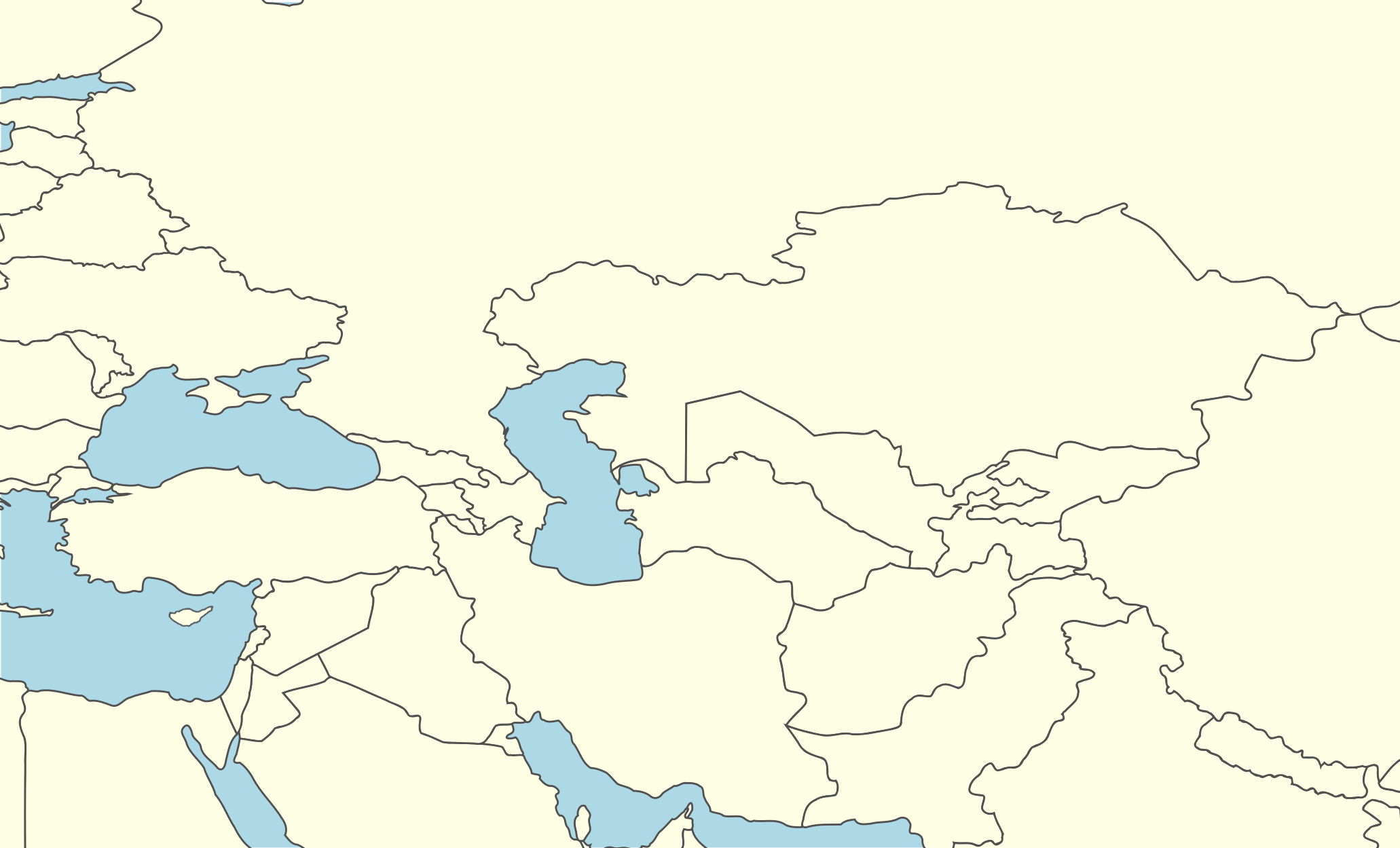
Location of Turkic Council Summits

The following lists the Turkic Council Heads of States Summits organized between 2011 and 2021. Prior to 2011, Turkic Speaking States summits were held between 1992 and 2010. Organization of Turkic States Summits are held since 2022.

== 1st summit ==
First Turkic Council summit was held in Almaty, Kazakhstan on October 21, 2011. The theme was "Cooperation in Economic Area and Trade Area". Foundation of Turkic Business Council has been signed in the summit.

Participants

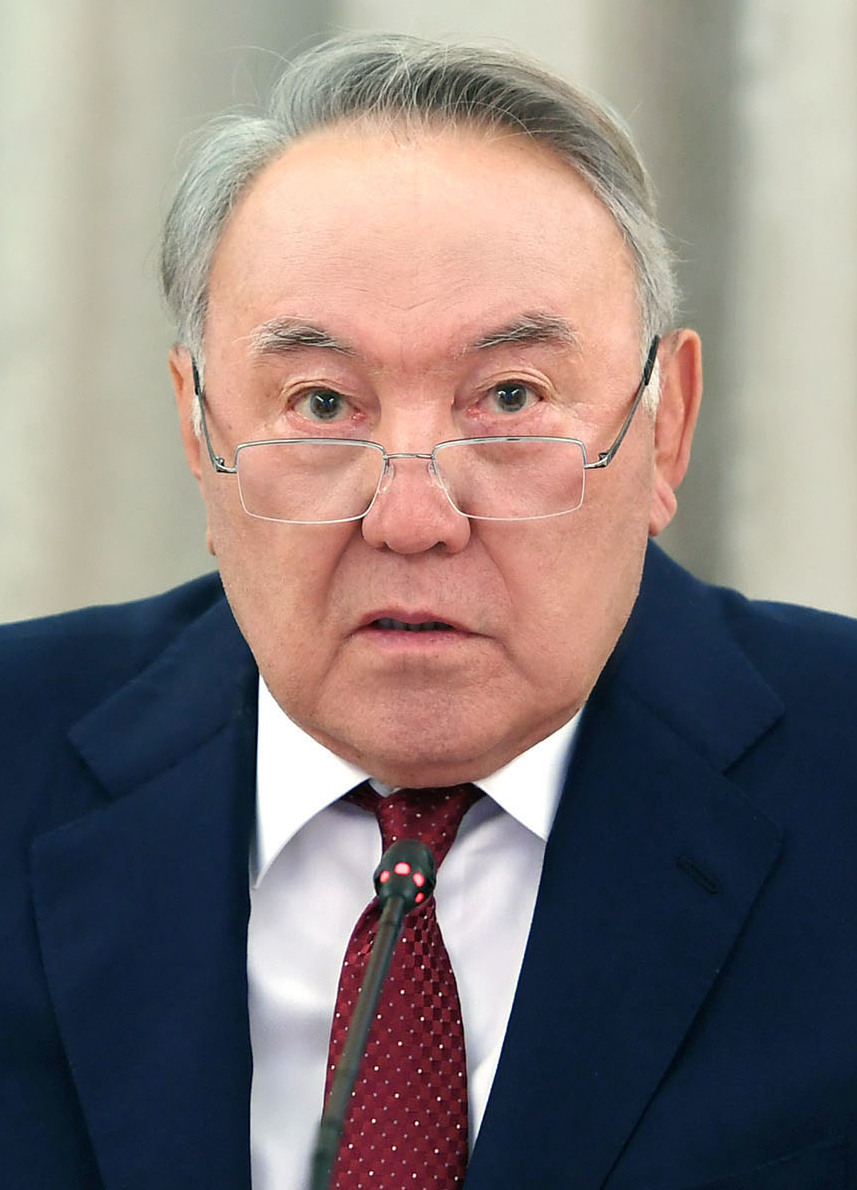
Nursultan Nazarbayev, President of the Republic of Kazakhstan (Host)

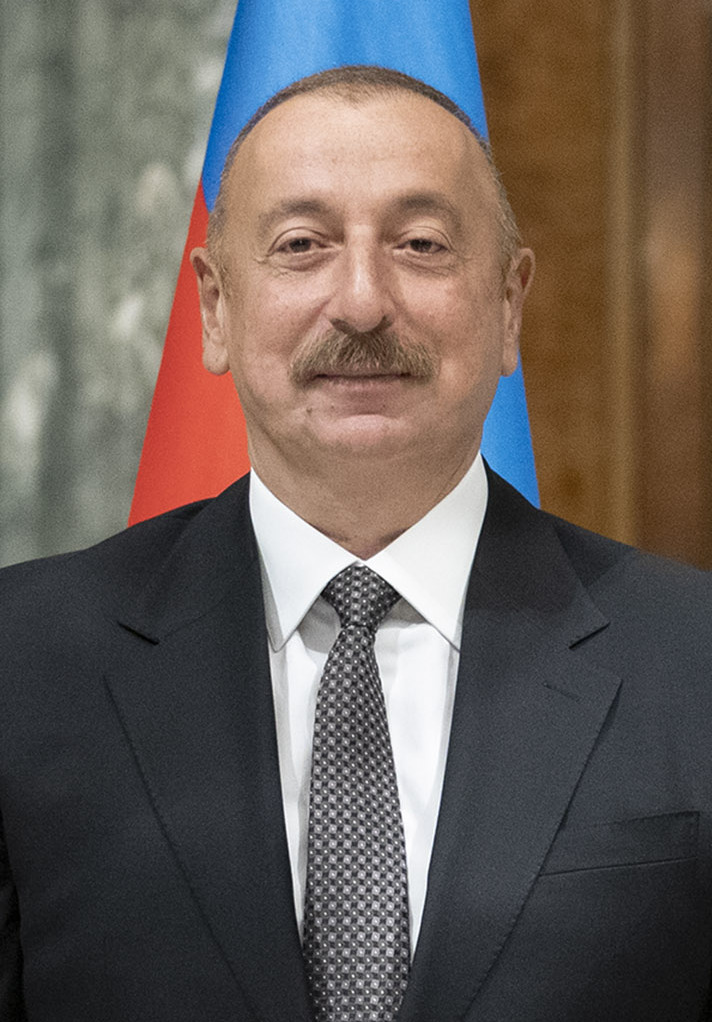
Ilham Aliyev, President of the Republic of Azerbaijan

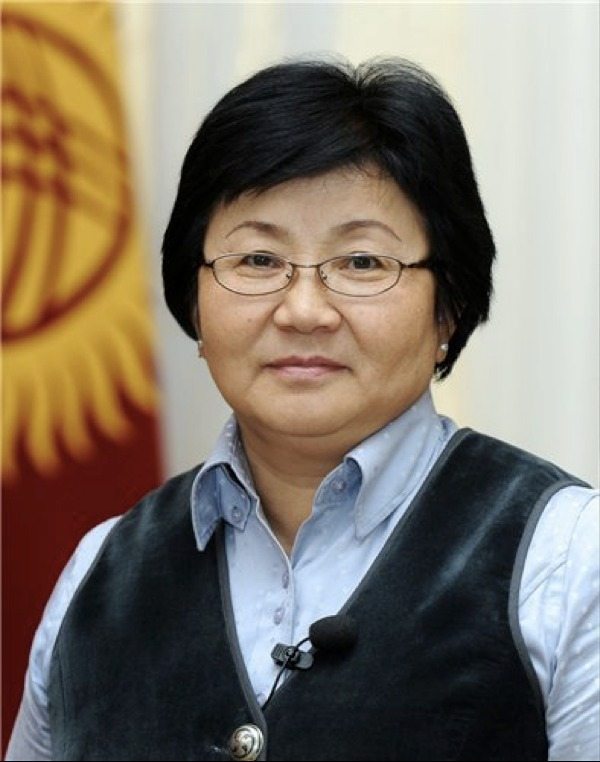
Roza Otunbayeva, President of the Kyrgyz Republic

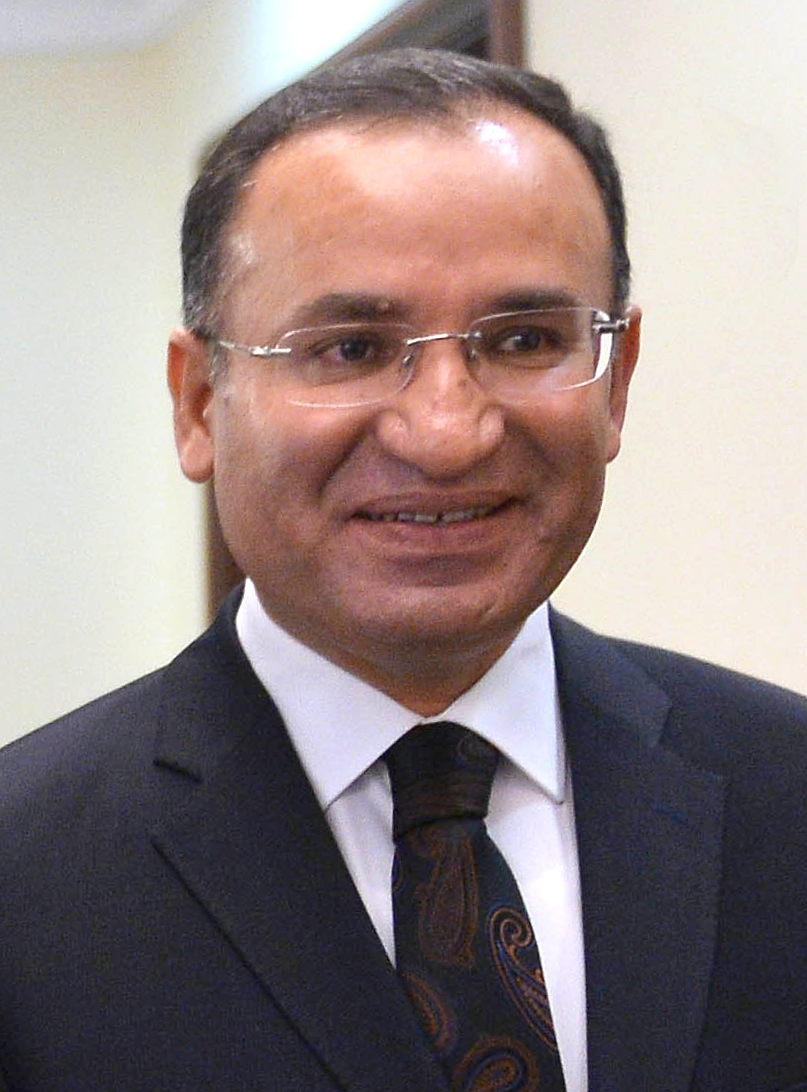
Bekir Bozdağ, Deputy Prime Minister of Turkey

== 2nd summit ==
Second Turkic Council summit was held in Bishkek, Kyrgyzstan on August 23, 2012. The theme was "Cooperation in Education, Science and Culture". Foundation of Turkic Academy and Turkic Culture and Heritage Foundation were signed during the summit. The official flag of the council has been approved.

Participants

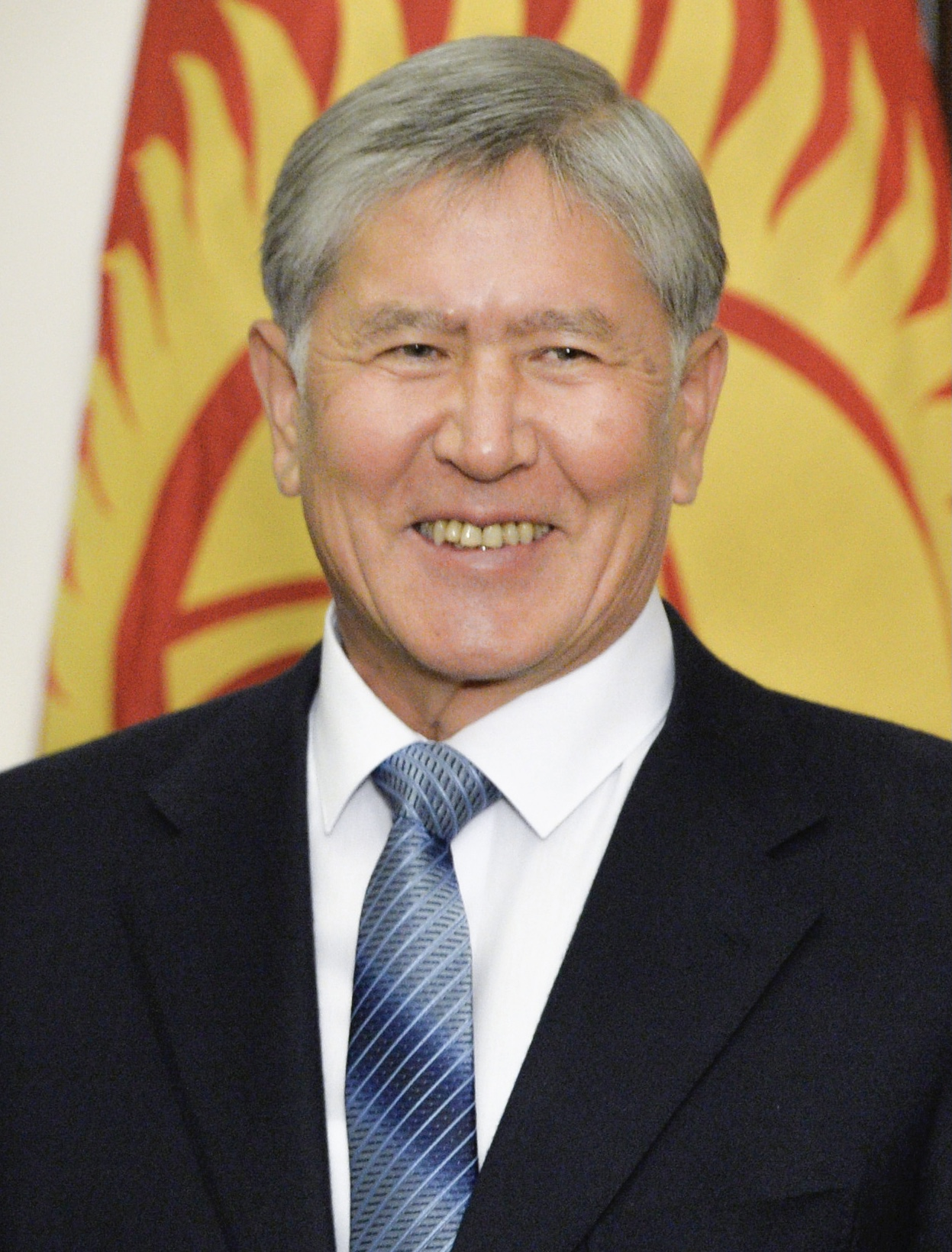
Almazbek Atambaev, President of the Kyrgyz Republic (Host)

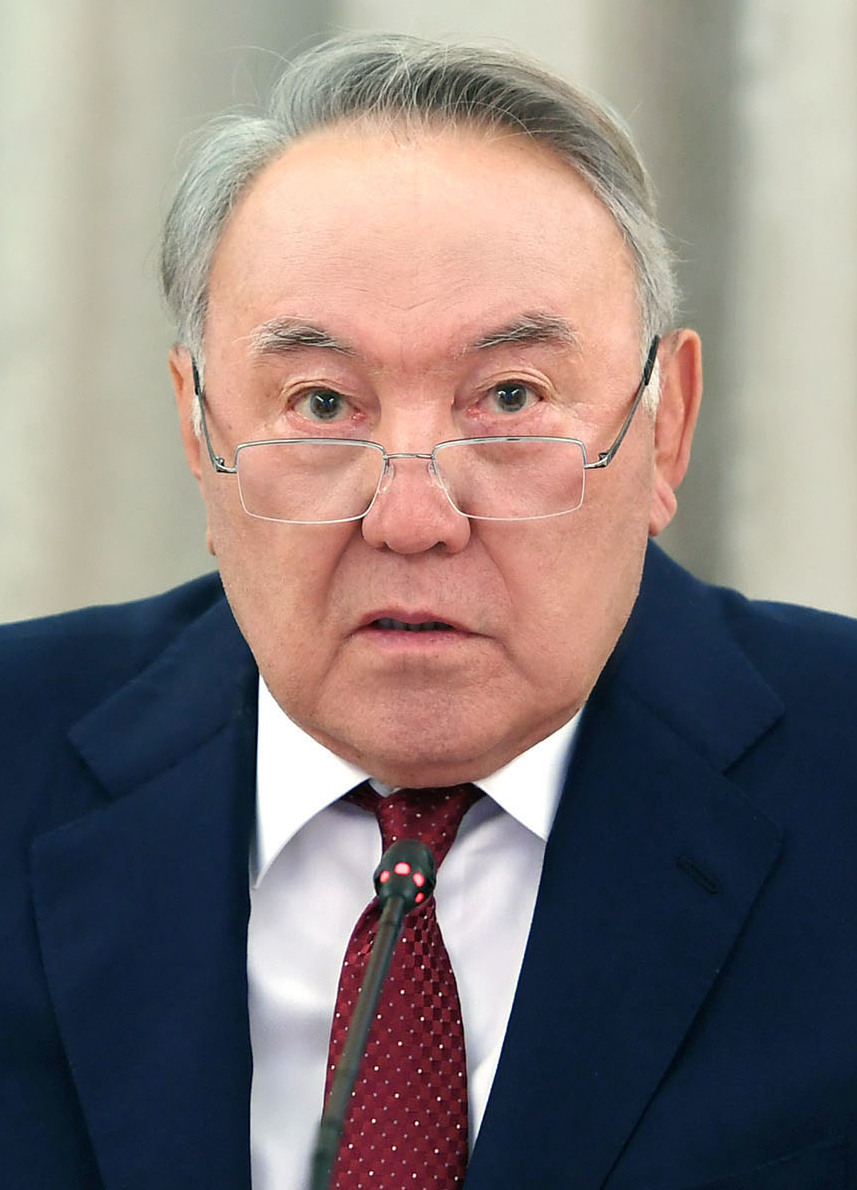
Nursultan Nazarbayev, President of the Republic of Kazakhstan

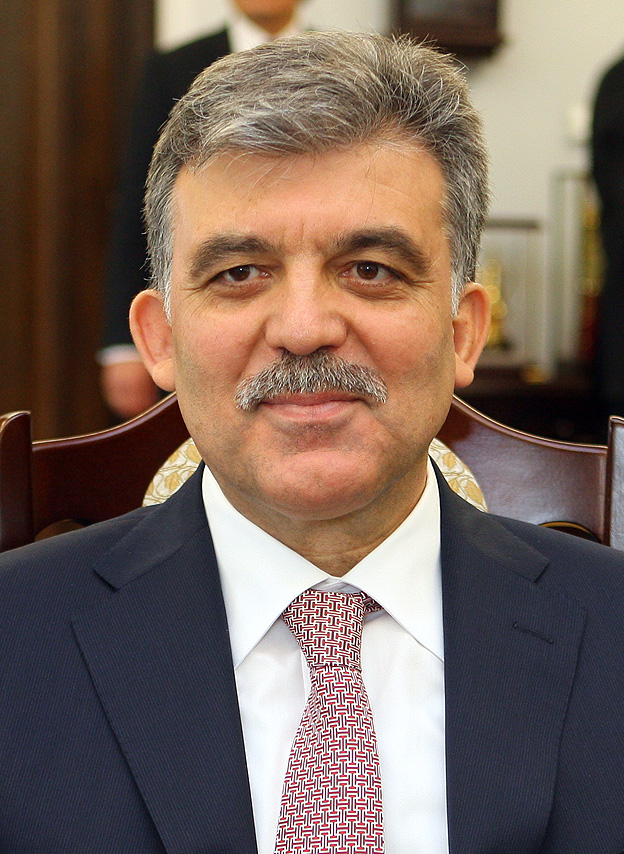
Abdullah Gül, President of the Republic of Turkey

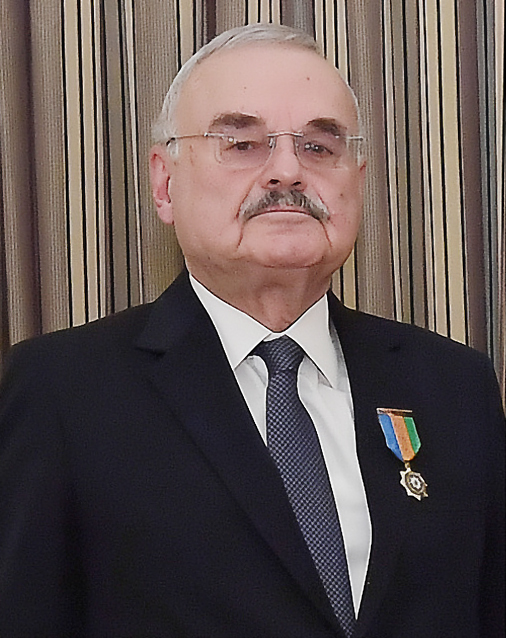
Artur Rasizade, Prime Minister of Azerbaijan

== 3rd summit ==
Third Turkic Council summit was held in Qabala, Azerbaijan on August 16, 2013. The theme was "Cooperation in Transportation".

Participants

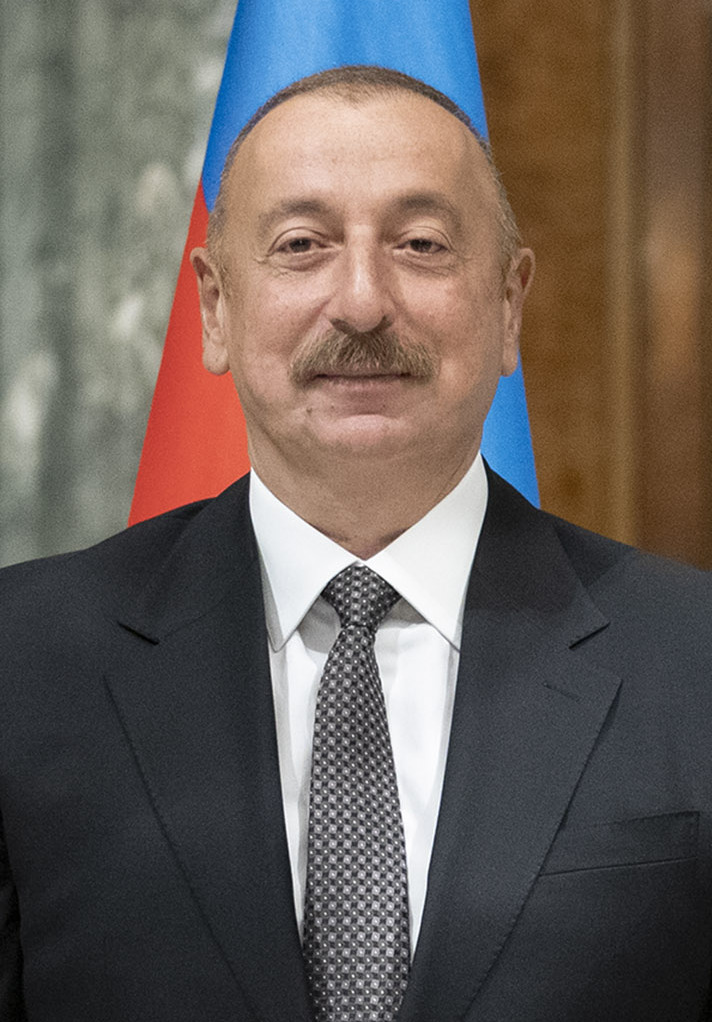
Ilham Aliyev, President of the Republic of Azerbaijan (Host)

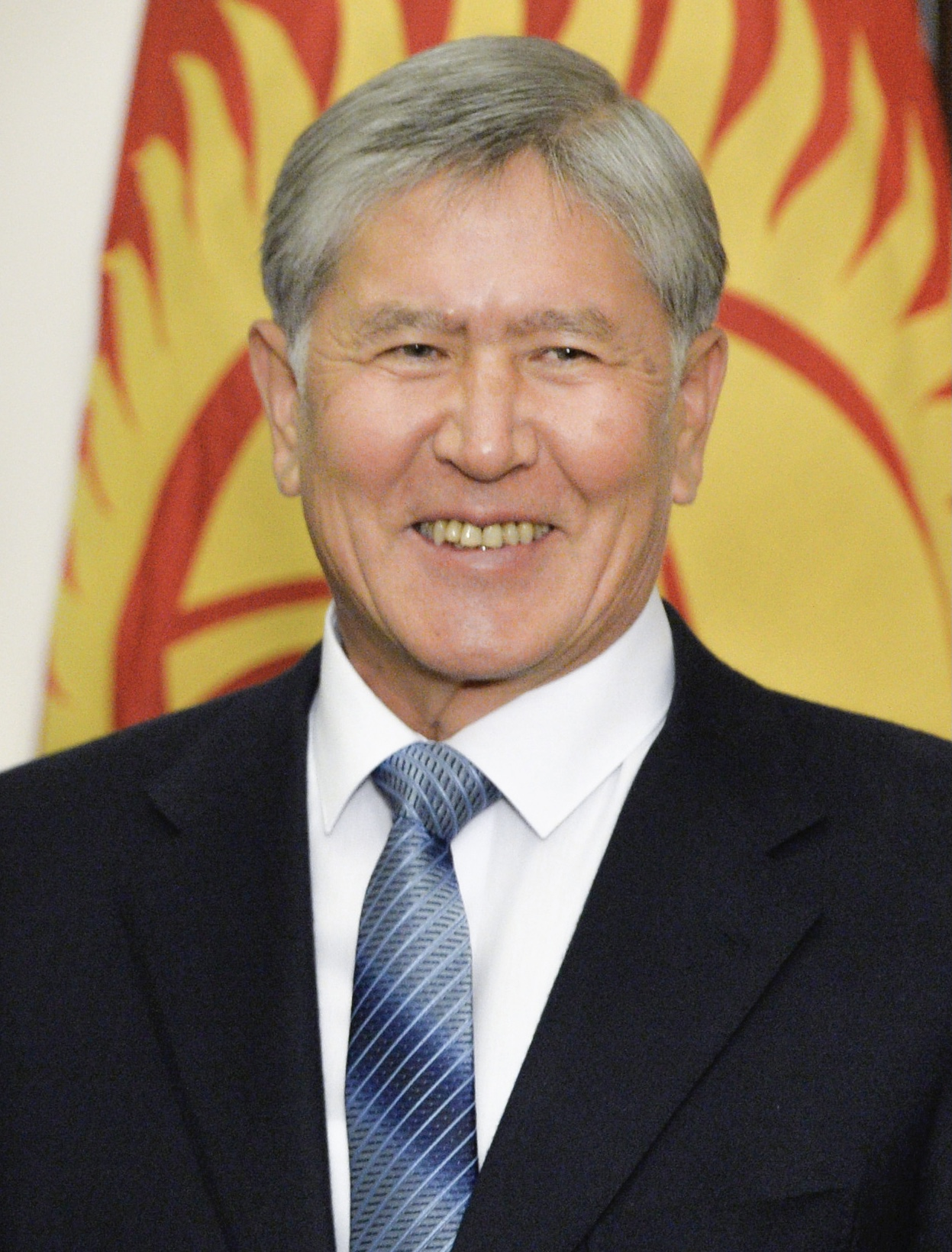
Almazbek Atambaev, President of the Kyrgyz Republic

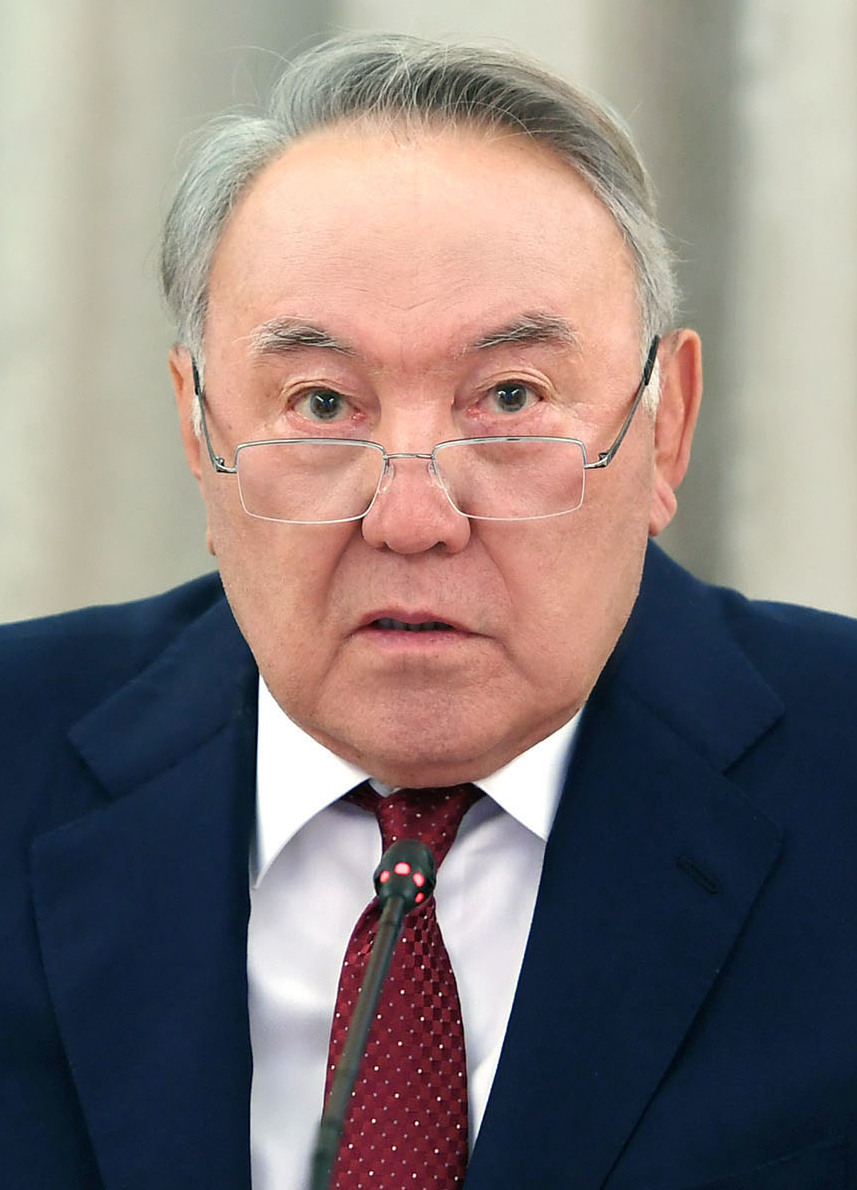
Nursultan Nazarbayev, President of the Republic of Kazakhstan

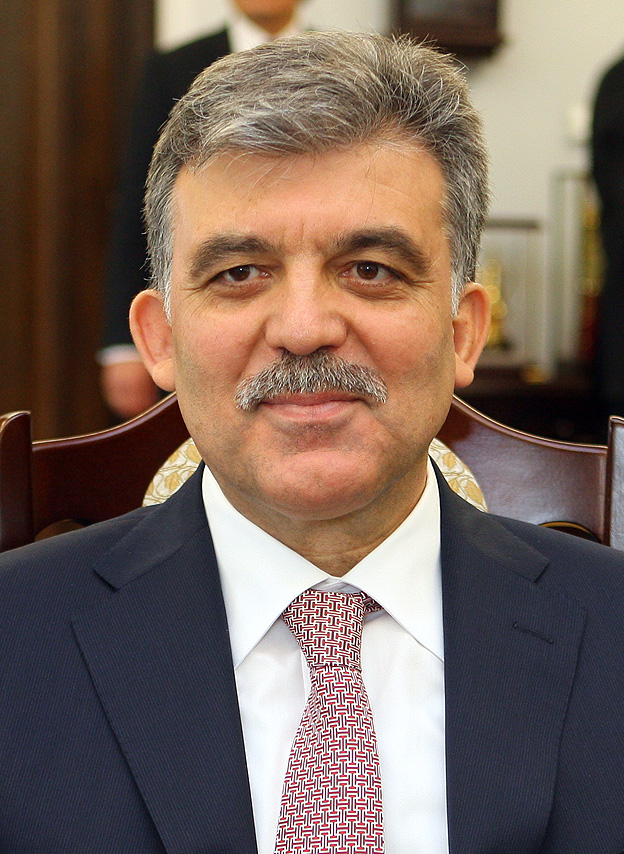
Abdullah Gül, President of the Republic of Turkey

== 4th summit ==
Fourth Turkic Council summit was held in Bodrum, Turkey on June 5, 2014. The theme was "Cooperation in Tourism".

Participants

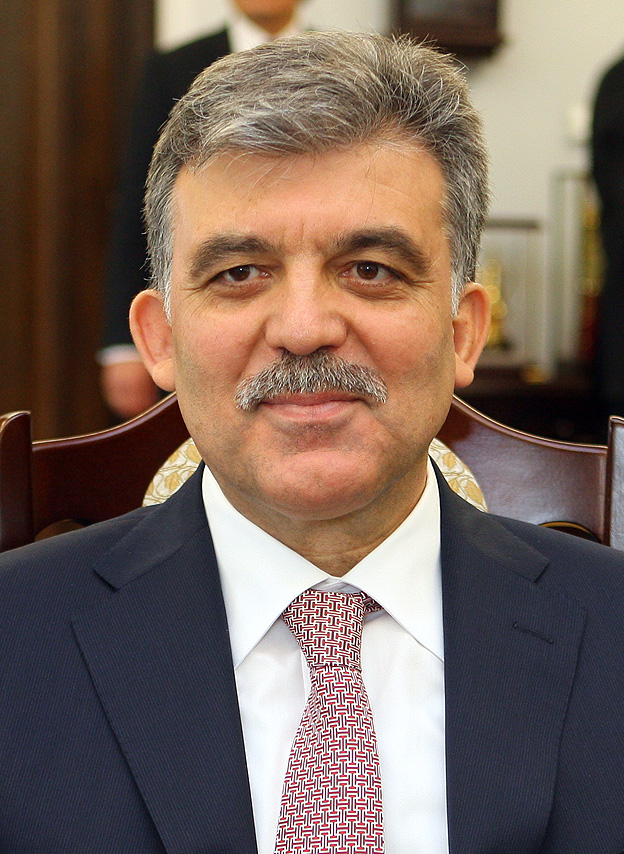
Abdullah Gül, President of the Republic of Turkey (Host)

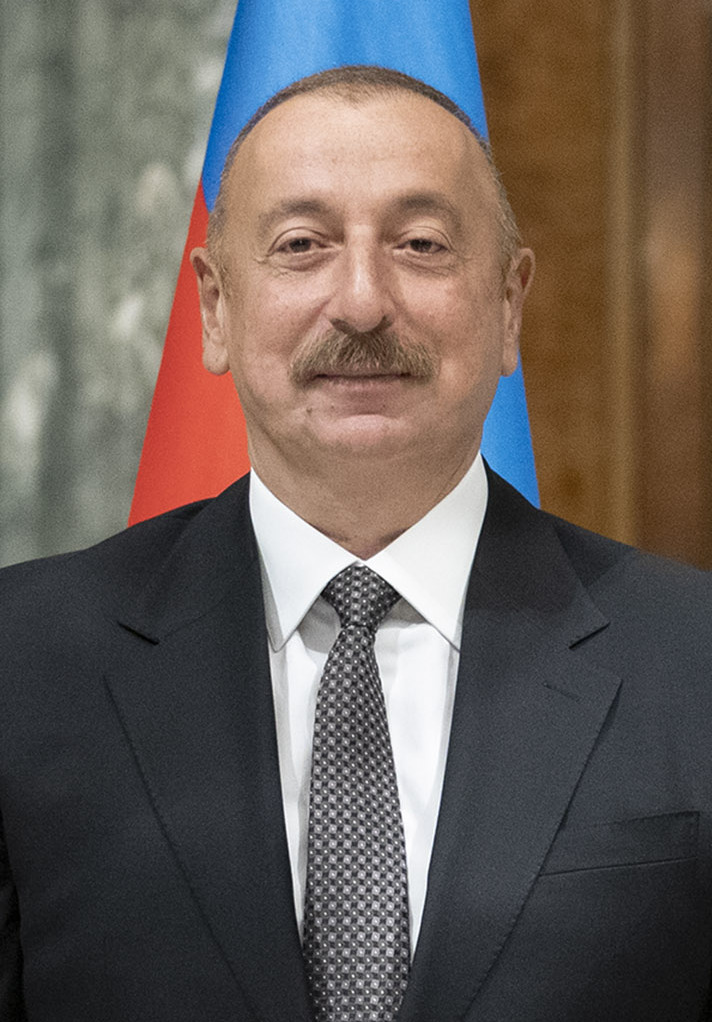
Ilham Aliyev, President of the Republic of Azerbaijan

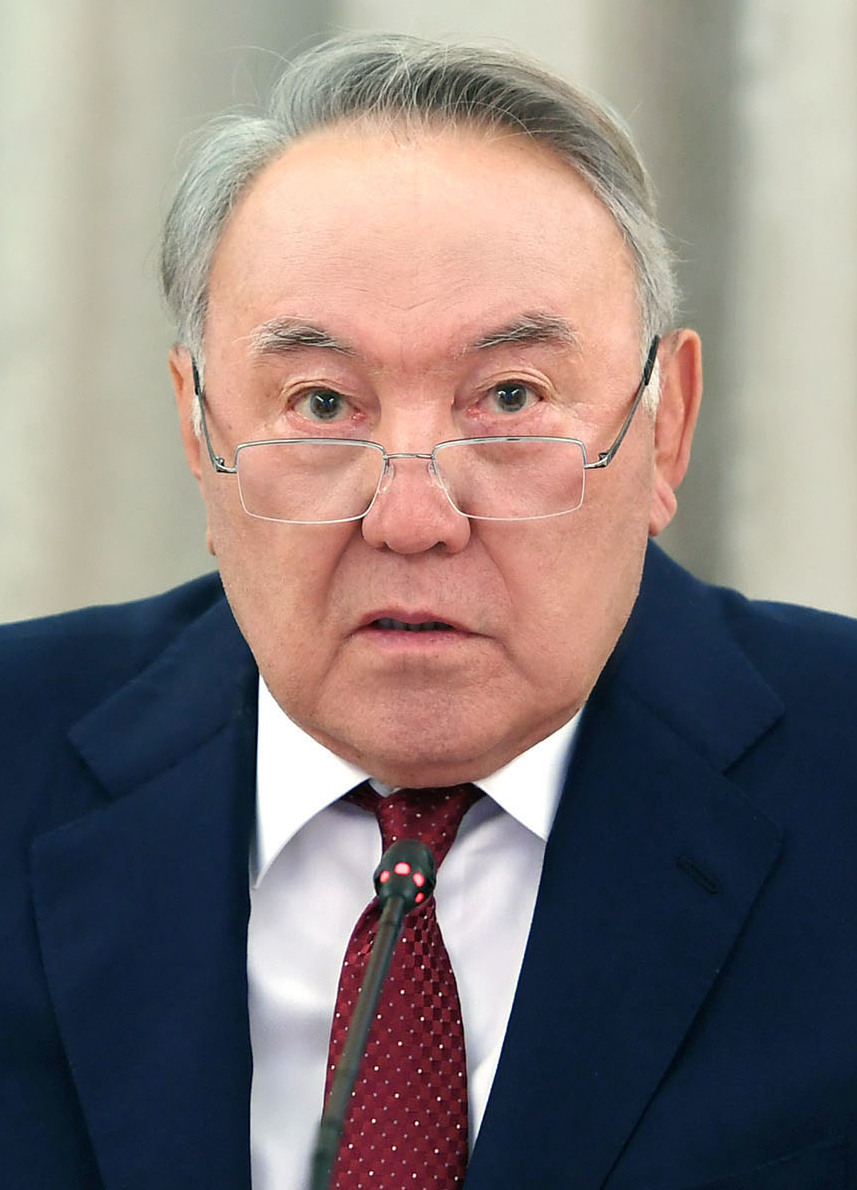
Nursultan Nazarbayev, President of the Republic of Kazakhstan

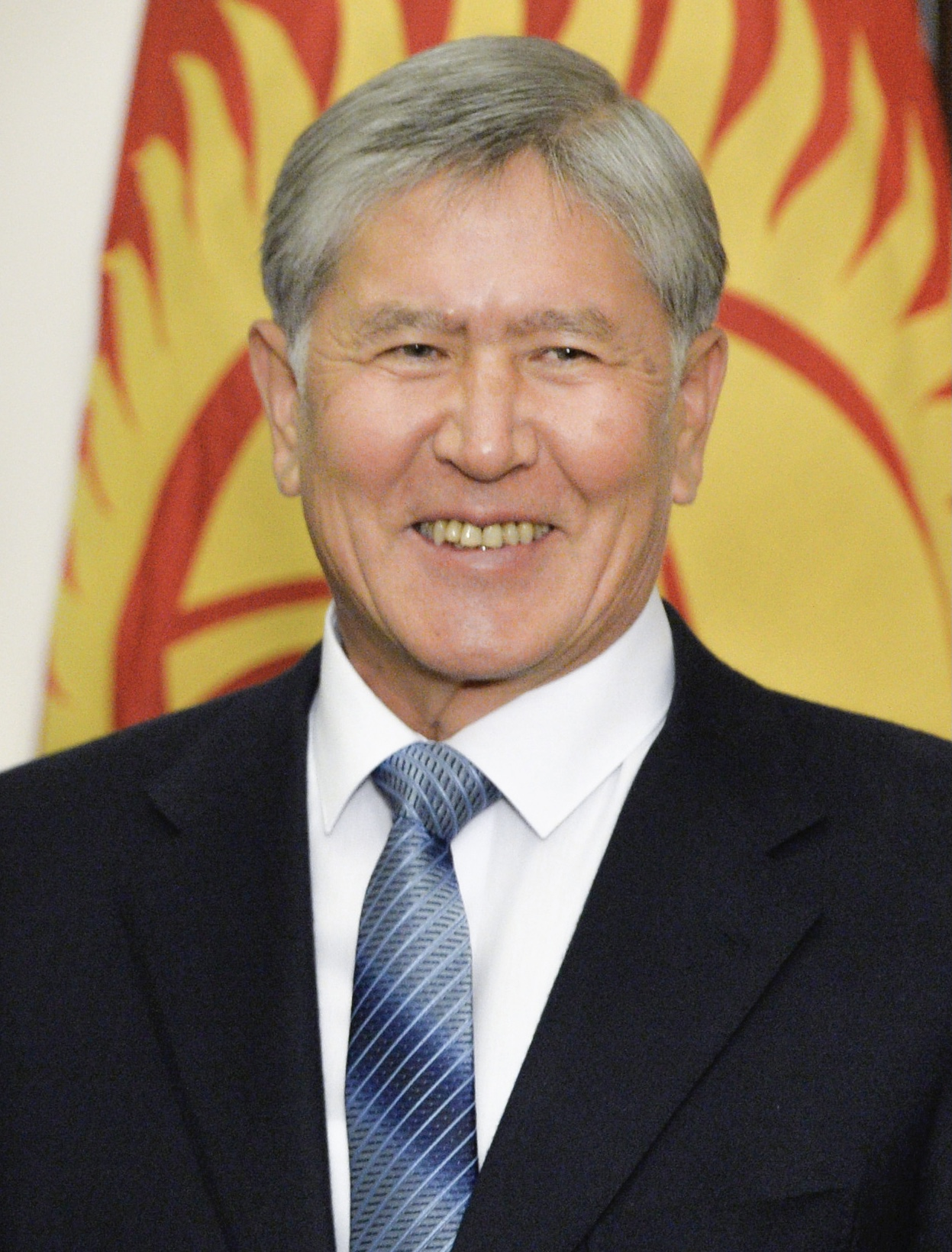
Almazbek Atambaev, President of the Kyrgyz Republic

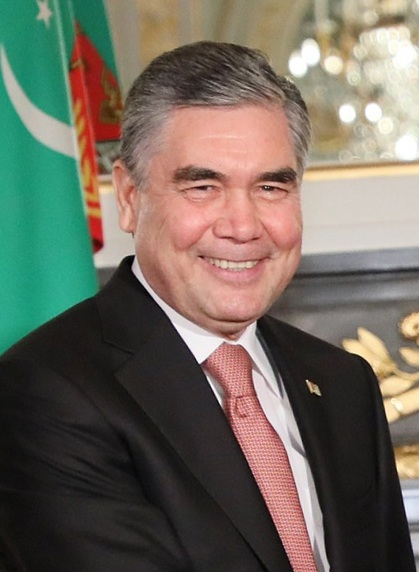
Gurbanguly Berdimuhamedow, President of Turkmenistan (Guest)

== 5th summit ==
Fifth Turkic Council summit was held in Nur-Sultan, Kazakhstan on September 11, 2015. The theme was "Cooperation in Media and Information".

Participants

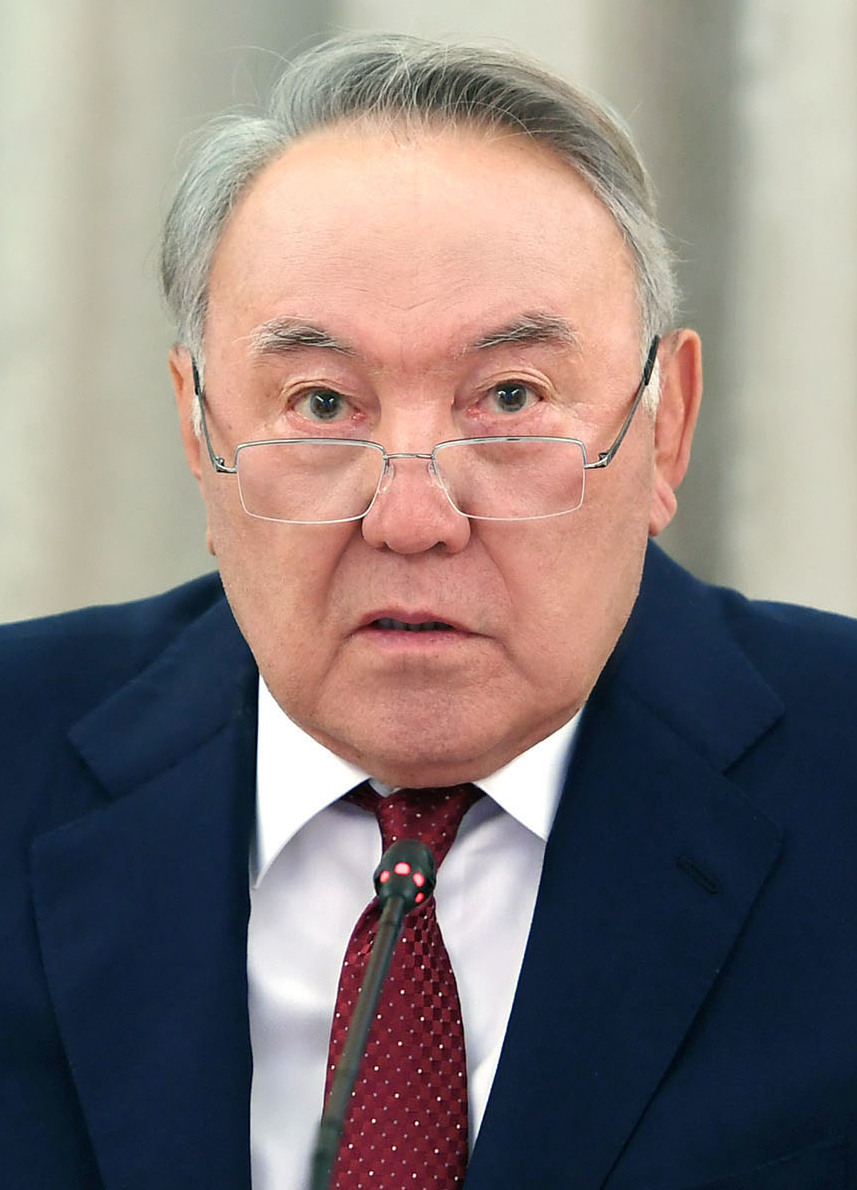
Nursultan Nazarbayev, President of the Republic of Kazakhstan (Host)

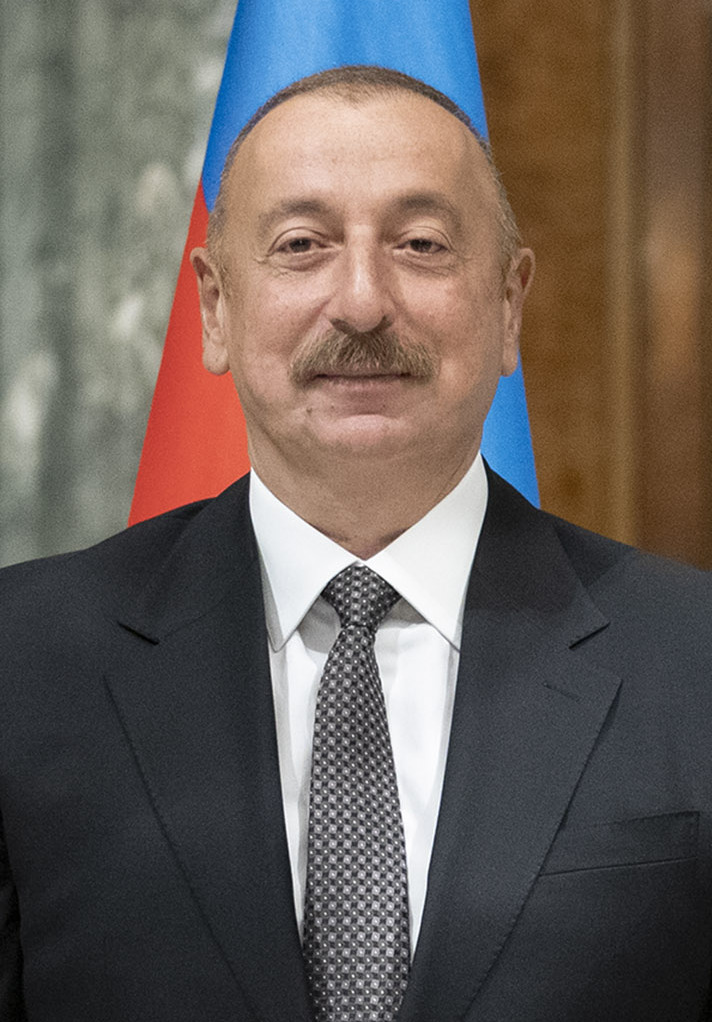
Ilham Aliyev, President of the Republic of Azerbaijan

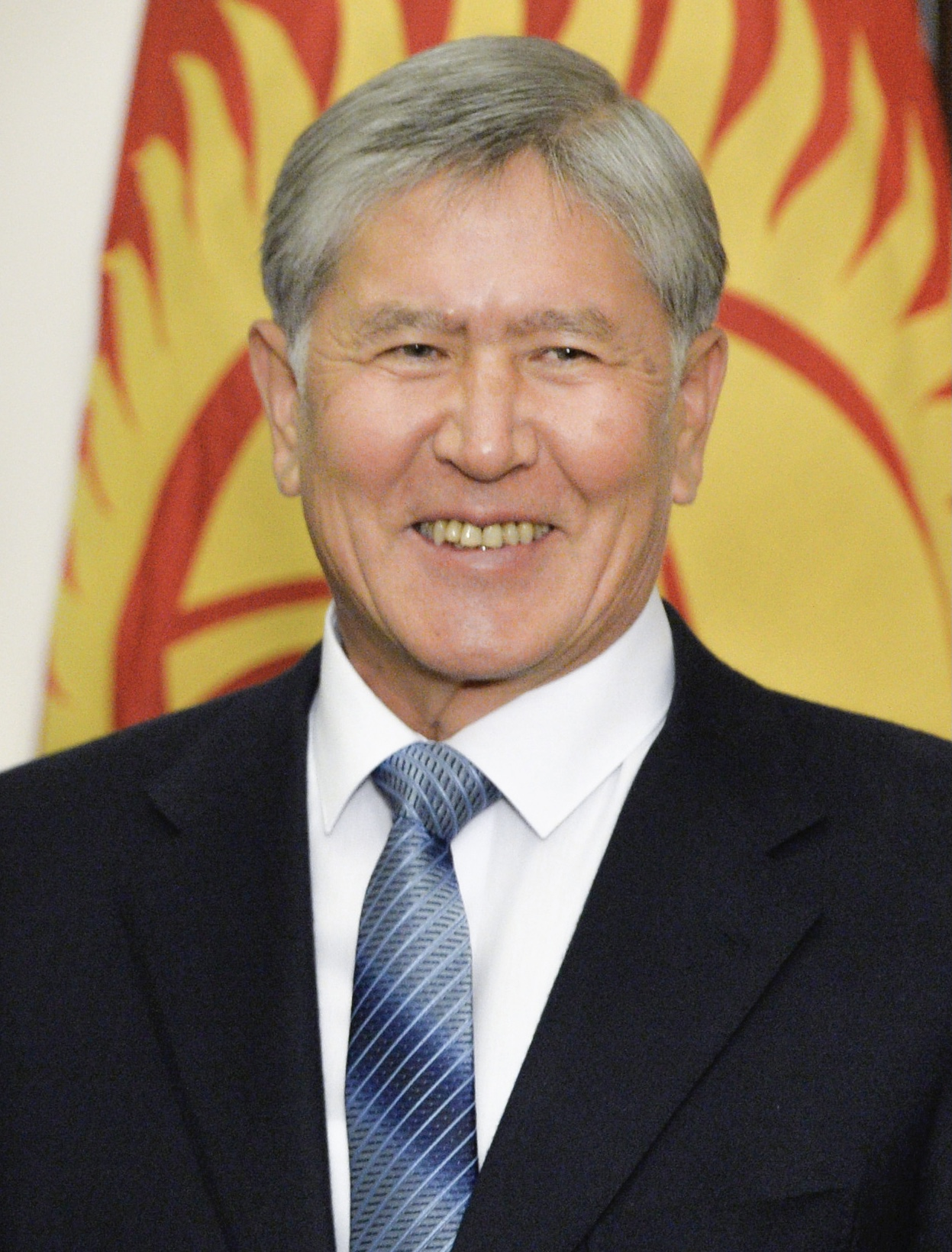
Almazbek Atambaev, President of the Kyrgyz Republic

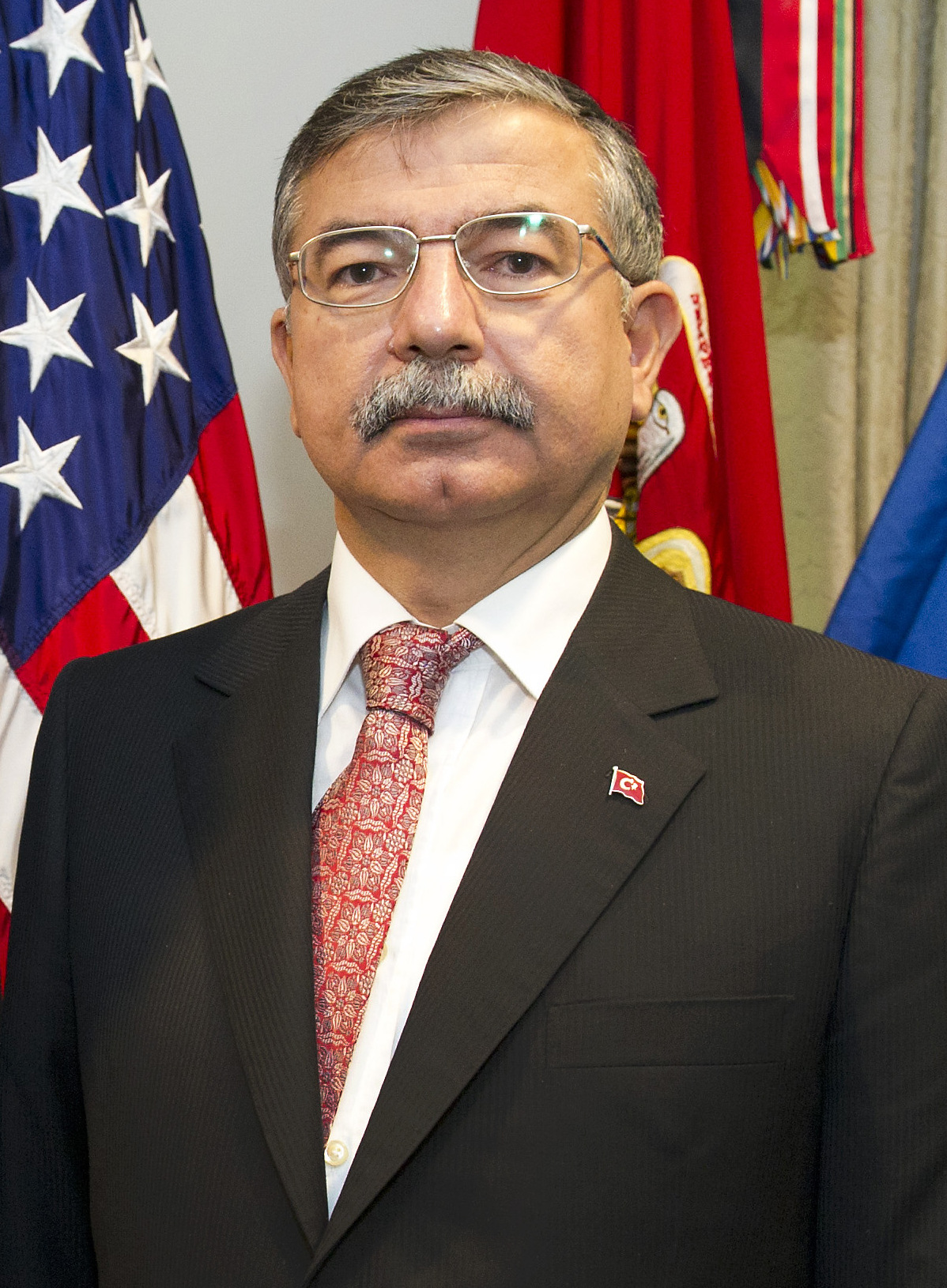
İsmet Yılmaz, Speaker of the Grand National Assembly of Turkey

Sapardurdy Toyliyev, Deputy Prime Minister of Turkmenistan (Guest)

== 6th summit ==
6th Turkic Council Summit
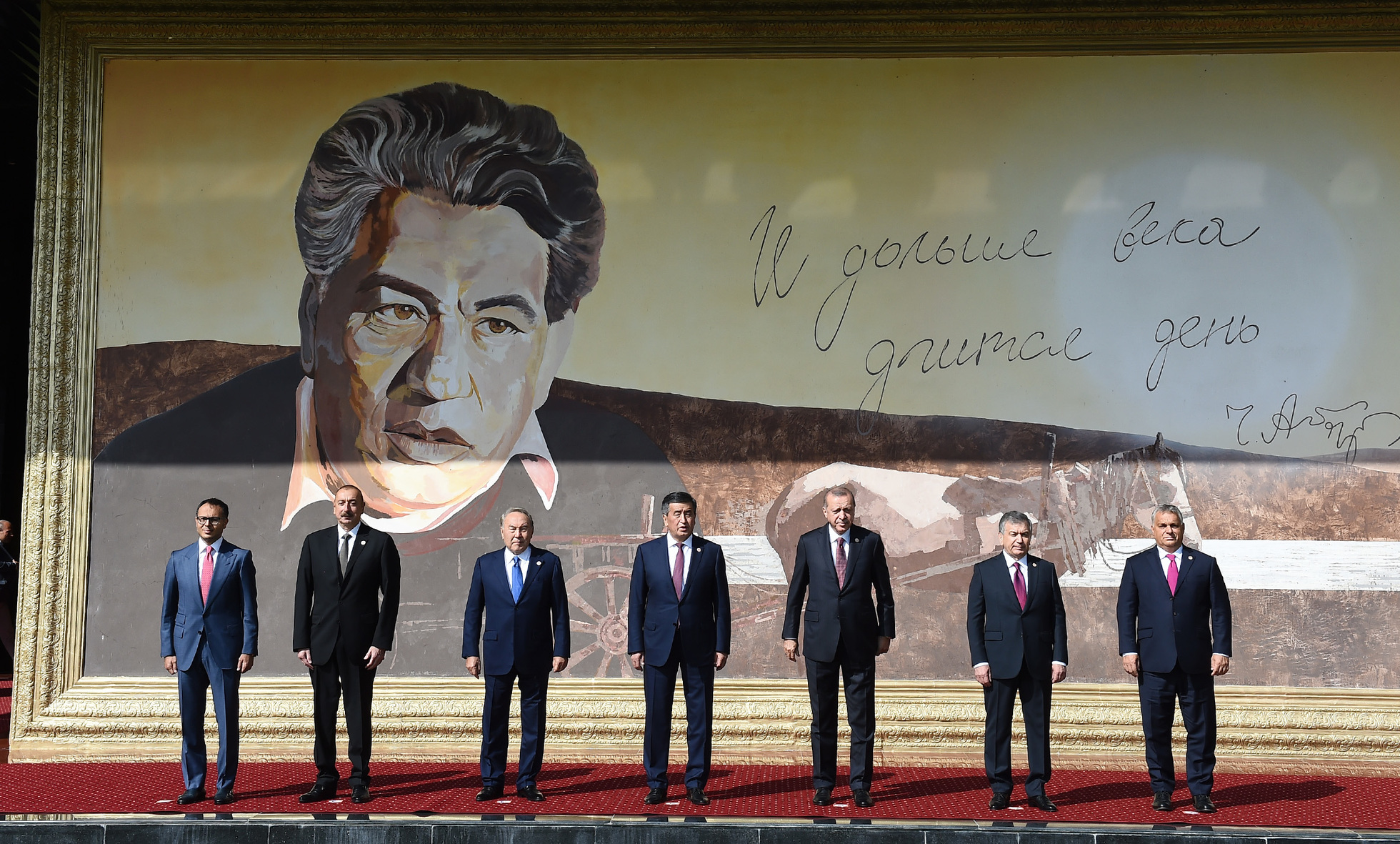
- Host country: Kyrgyzstan
- Date: September 2, 2018
- Cities: Cholpon Ata

Sixth Turkic Council summit was held in Cholpon Ata, Kyrgyzstan on September 2, 2018. The theme was "Youths and National Sports". Hungary joined the organization as an observer.

Participants

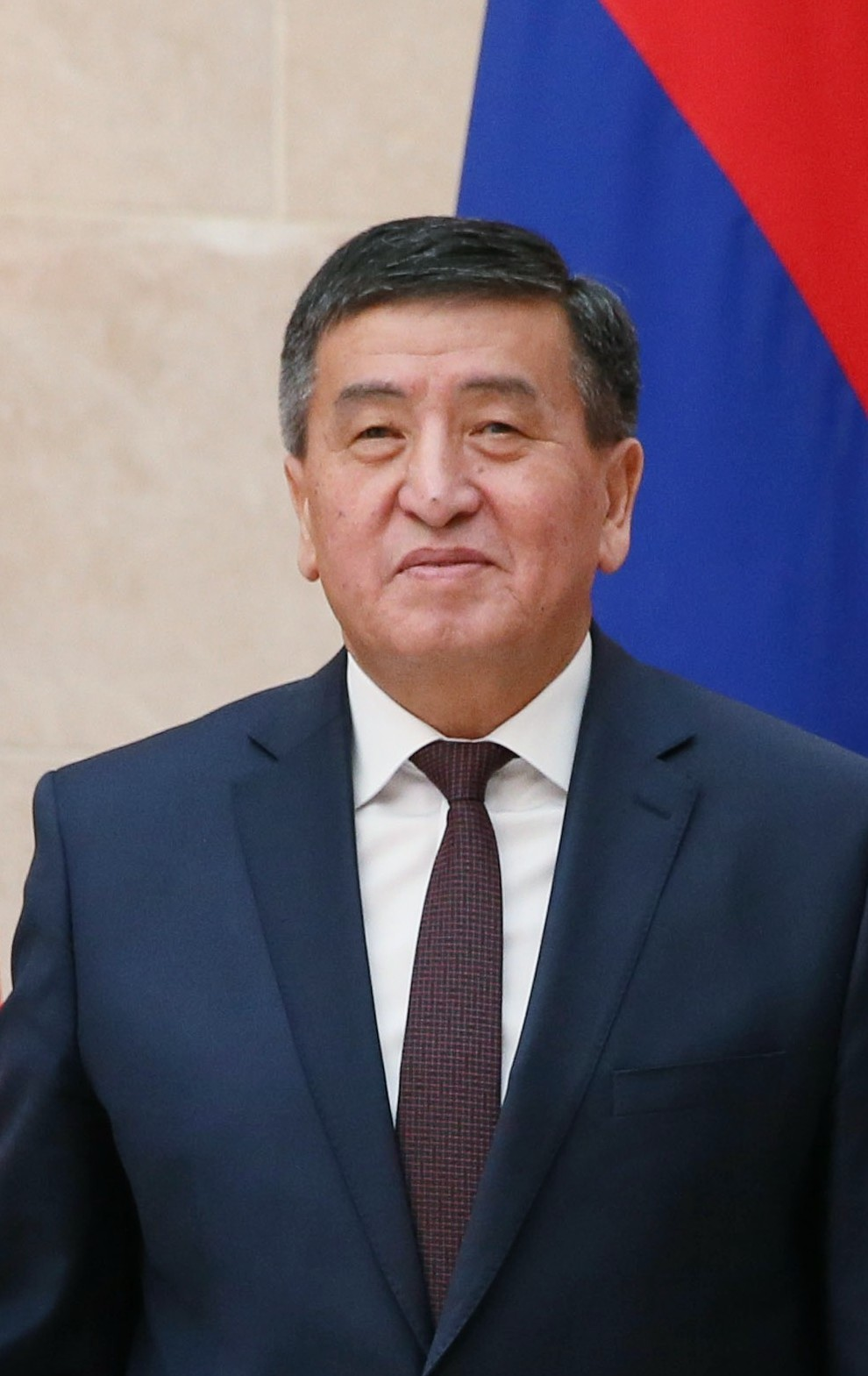
Sooronbay Jeenbekov, President of the Kyrgyz Republic (Host)

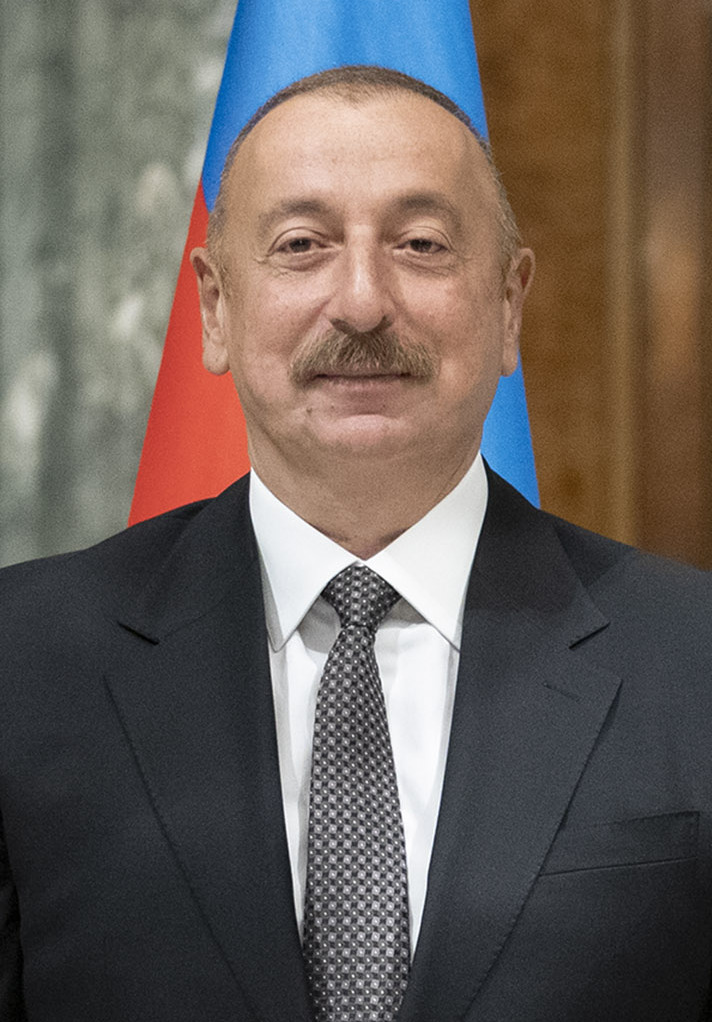
Ilham Aliyev, President of the Republic of Azerbaijan

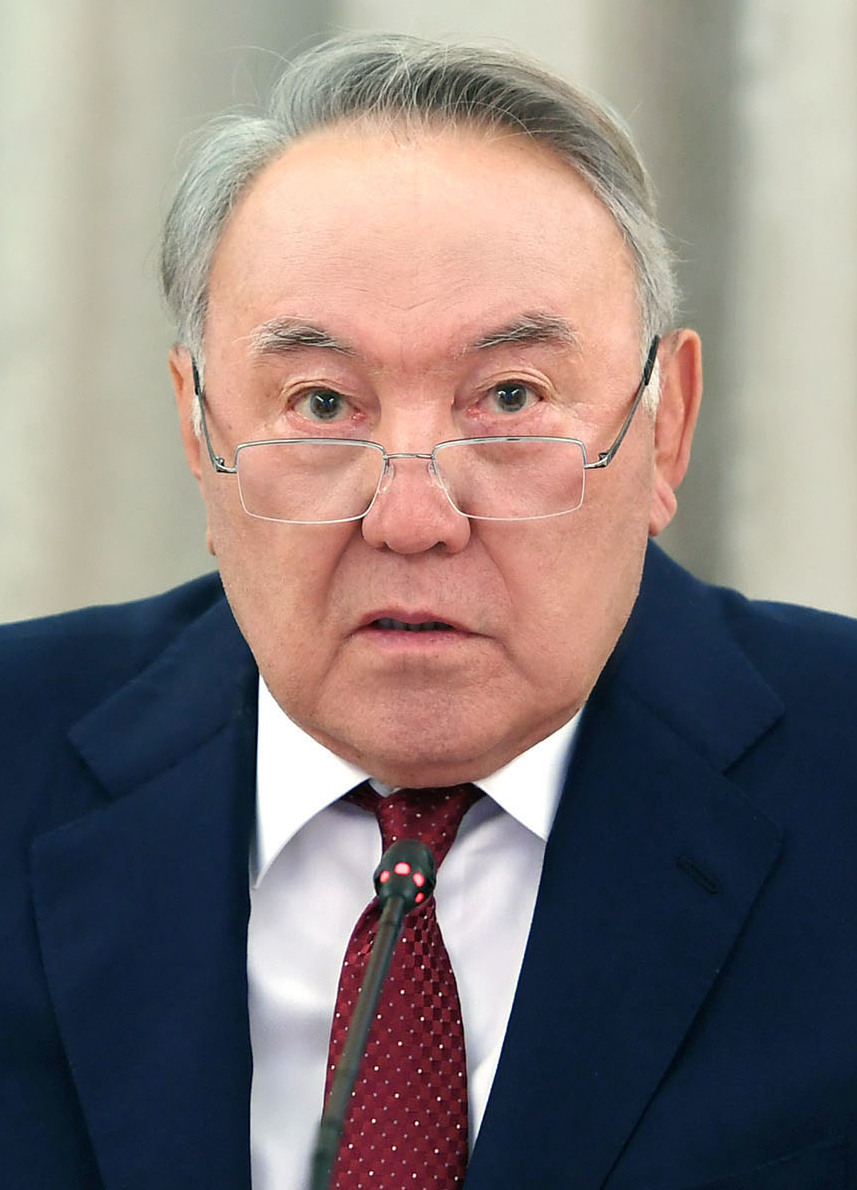
Nursultan Nazarbayev, President of the Republic of Kazakhstan

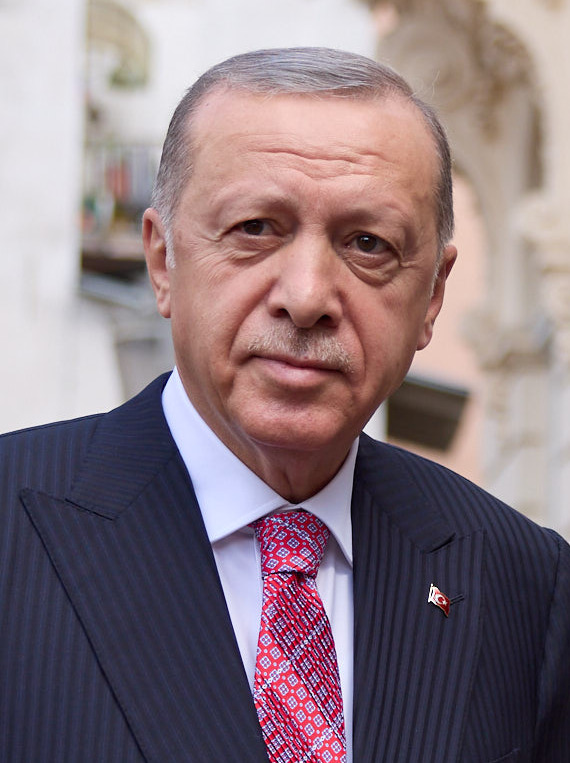
Recep Tayyip Erdoğan, President of the Republic of Turkey

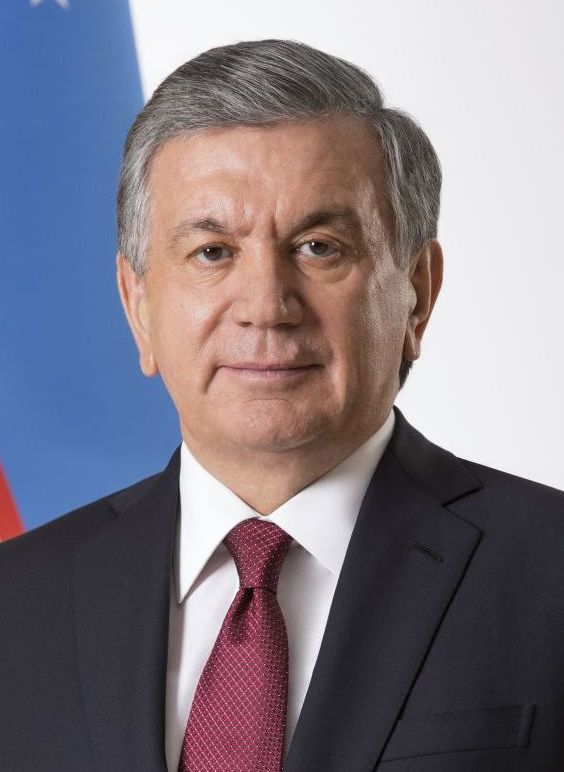
Shavkat Mirziyoyev, President of the Republic of Uzbekistan (Guest)

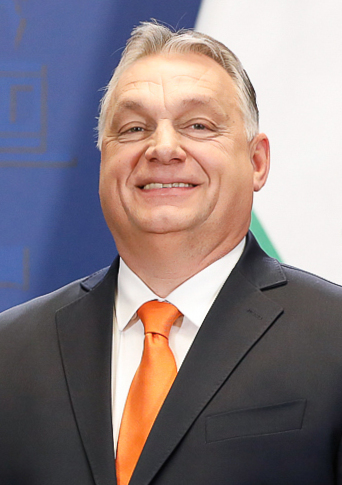
Viktor Orbán, Prime Minister of Hungary (Guest)

Ramil Hasan, Turkic Council Secretary General

== 7th summit ==
7th Turkic Council Summit
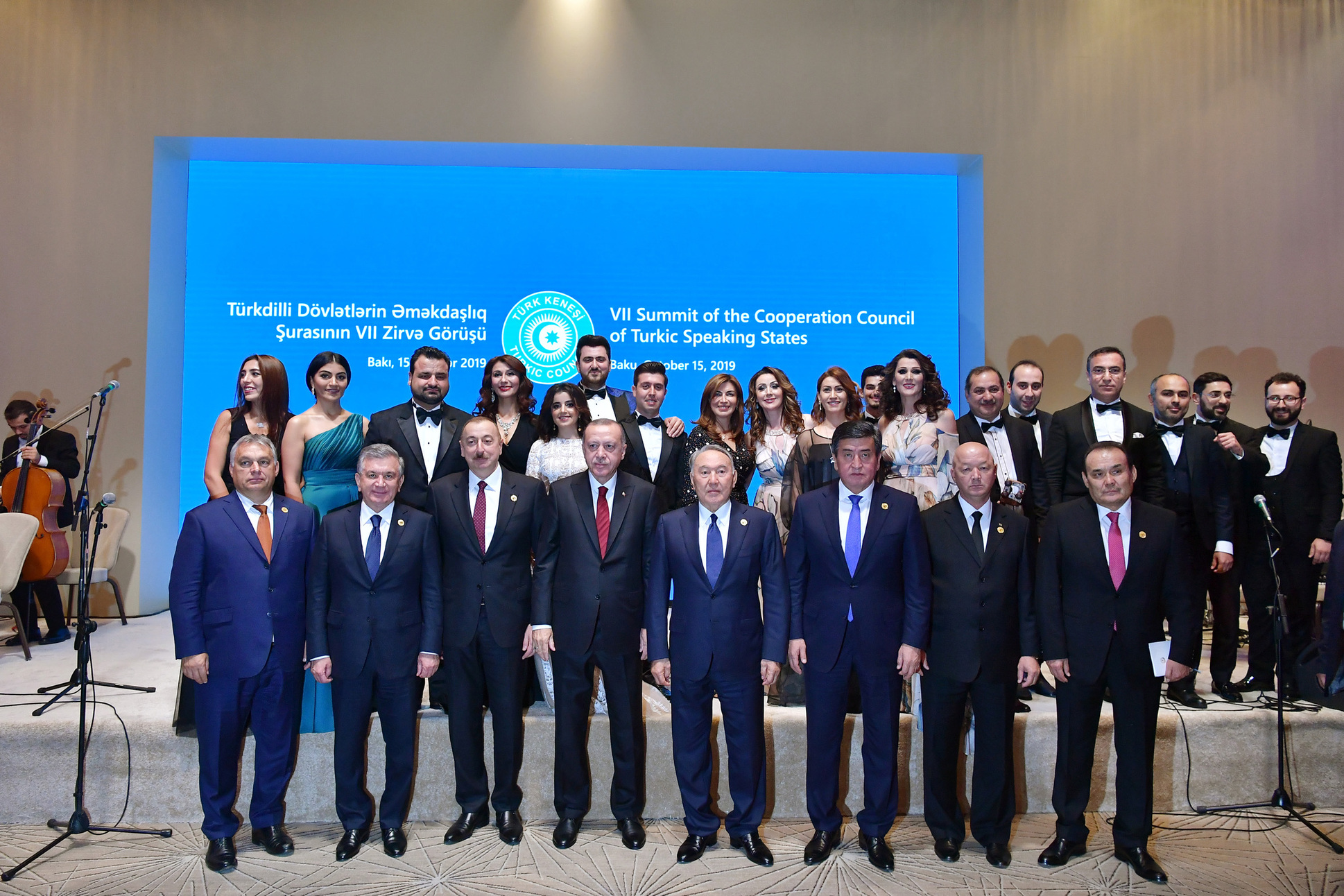
- Host country: Azerbaijan
- Date: October 15, 2019
- Cities: Baku

Seventh Turkic Council summit was held in Baku, Azerbaijan on October 15, 2019. The theme was "Supporting the Small and Medium-sized Enterprises (SMEs)". Uzbekistan joined the organization as a full member. Baku Declaration is announced at the end of the summit. First President of Kazakhstan Nursultan Nazarbayev is awarded with "Supreme Order of Turkic World".

Participants

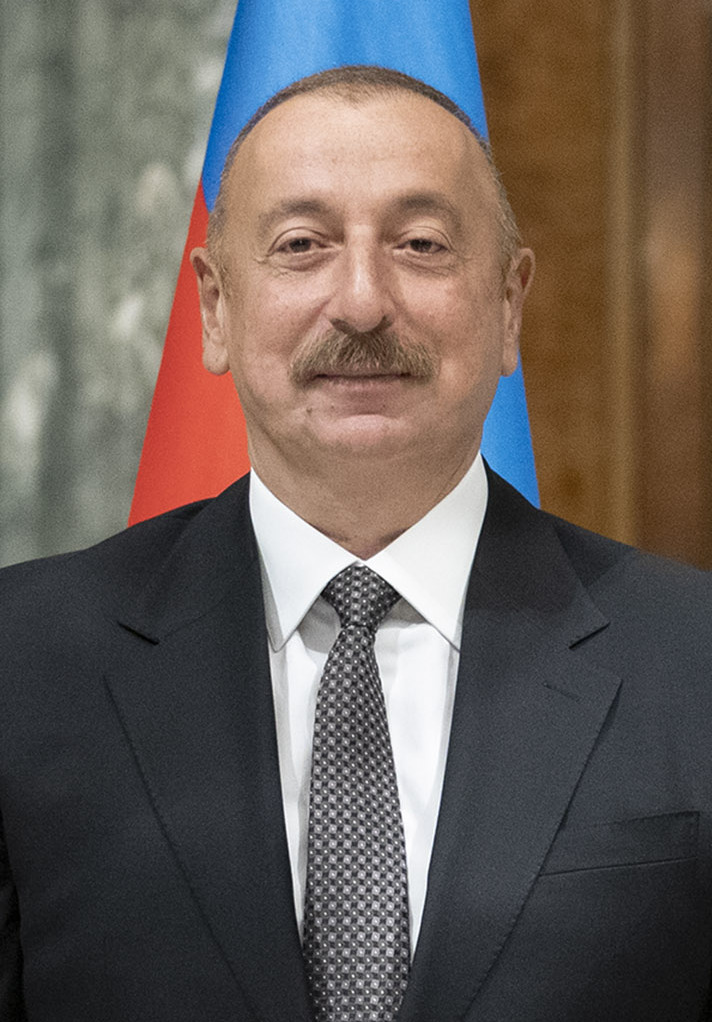
Ilham Aliyev, President of the Republic of Azerbaijan (Host)

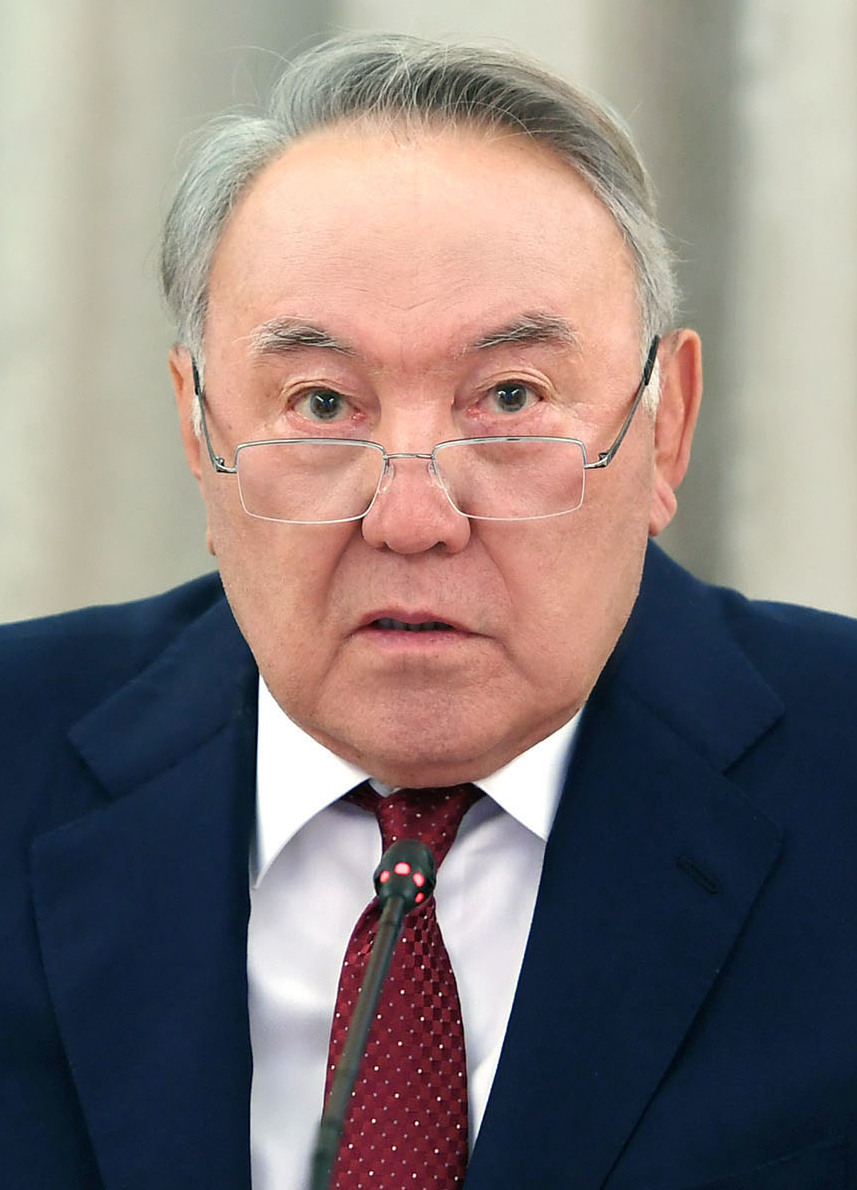
Nursultan Nazarbayev, First President of the Republic of Kazakhstan-Elbasy

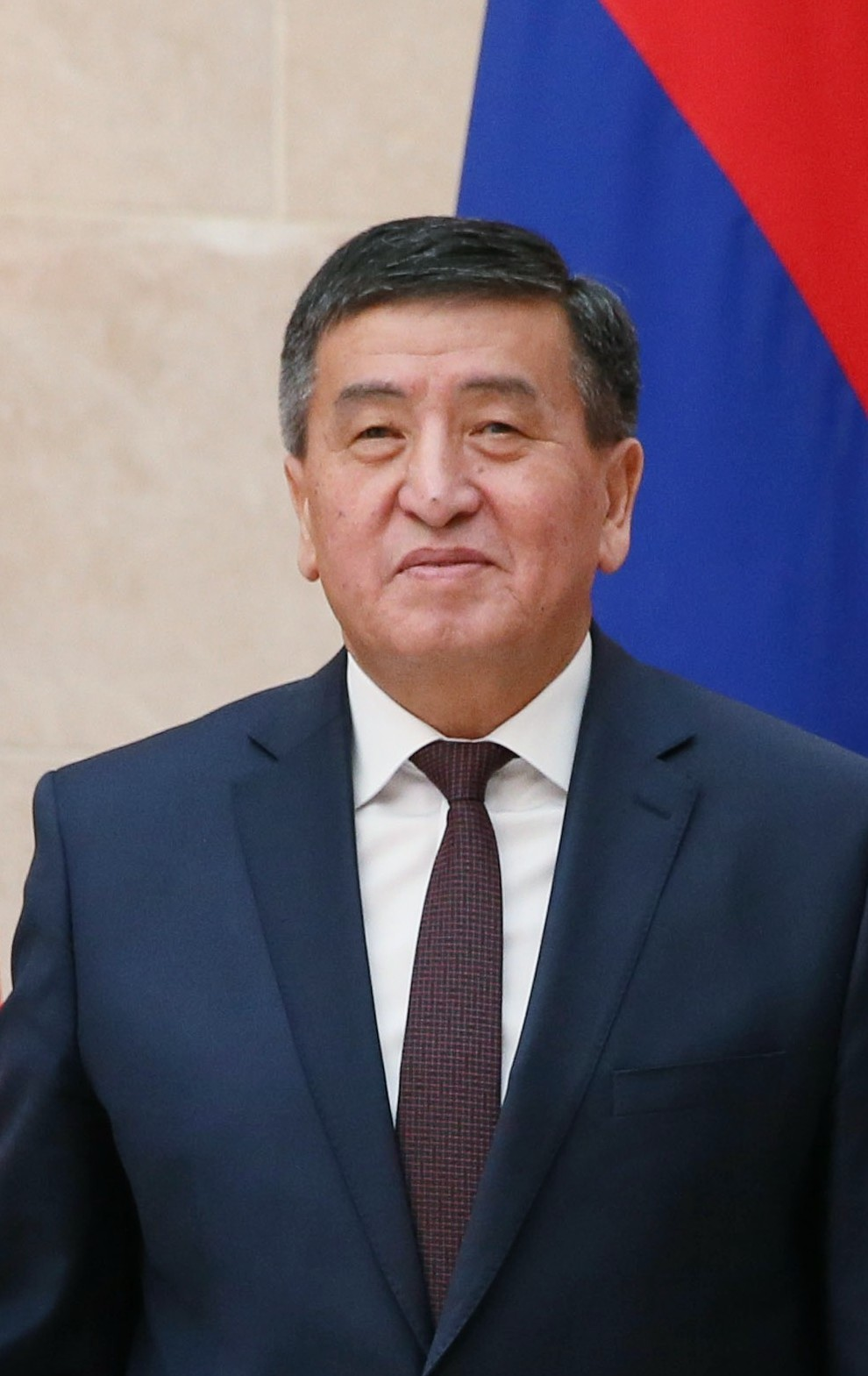
Sooronbay Jeenbekov, President of the Kyrgyz Republic

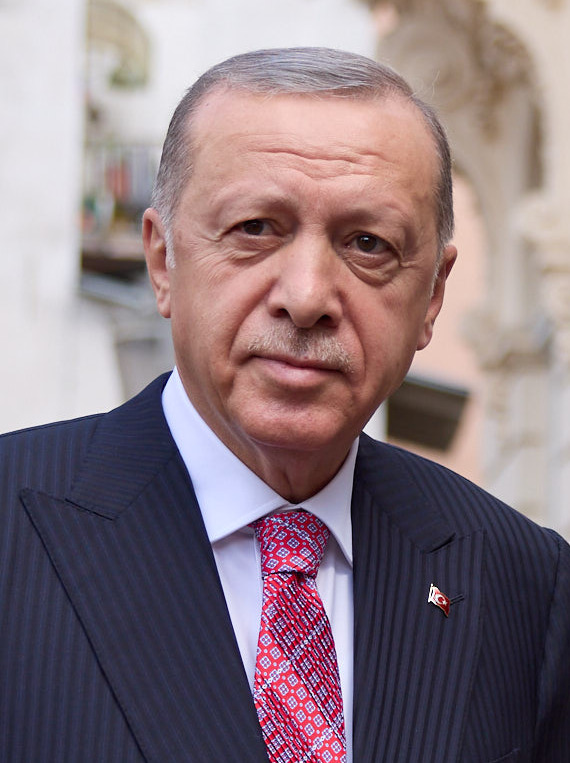
Recep Tayyip Erdoğan, President of the Republic of Turkey

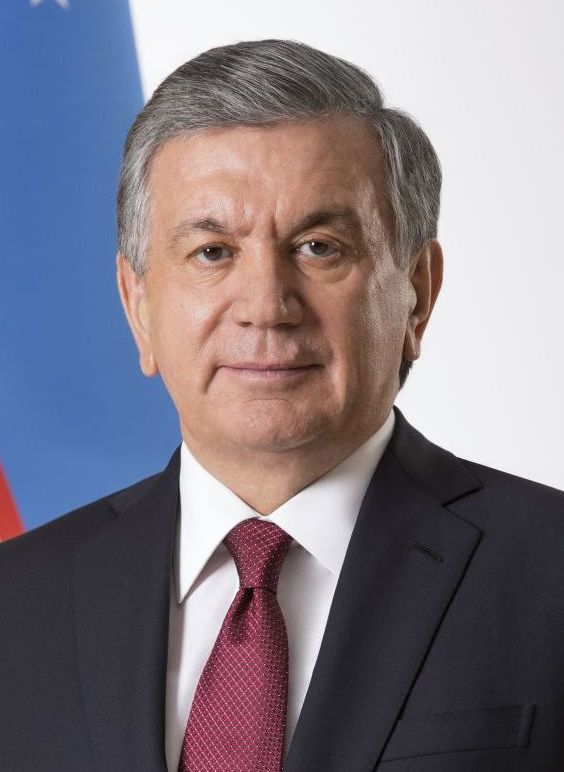
Shavkat Mirziyoyev, President of the Republic of Uzbekistan

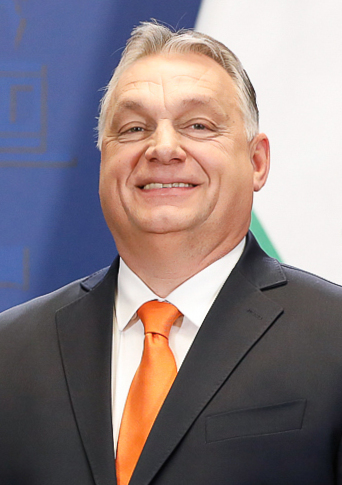
Viktor Orbán, Prime Minister of Hungary

Purli Agamyradov, Deputy Chairman of the Cabinet of Ministers of Turkmenistan

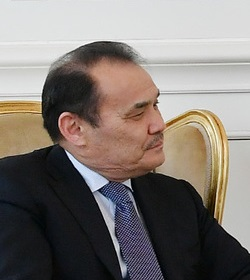
Baghdad Amreyev, Turkic Council Secretary General

== Extraordinary Video Summit ==
An extraordinary video summit was held on 10 April 2020 for COVID-19 pandemic. The theme was "Cooperation and solidarity in the fight against the COVID-19 pandemic".

Participants

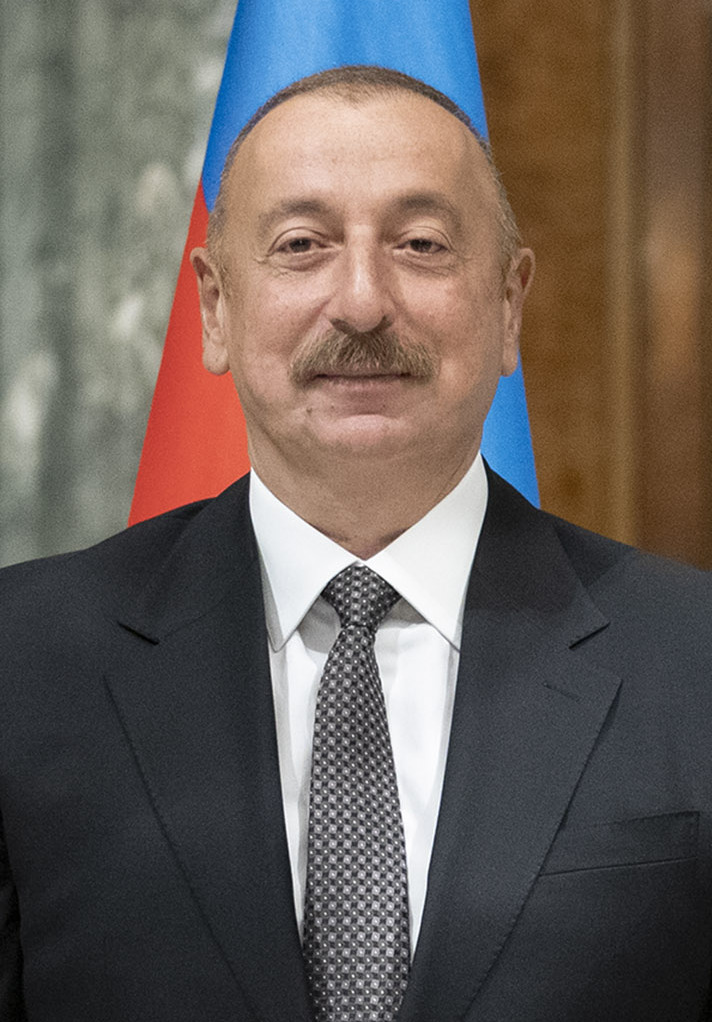
Ilham Aliyev, President of the Republic of Azerbaijan

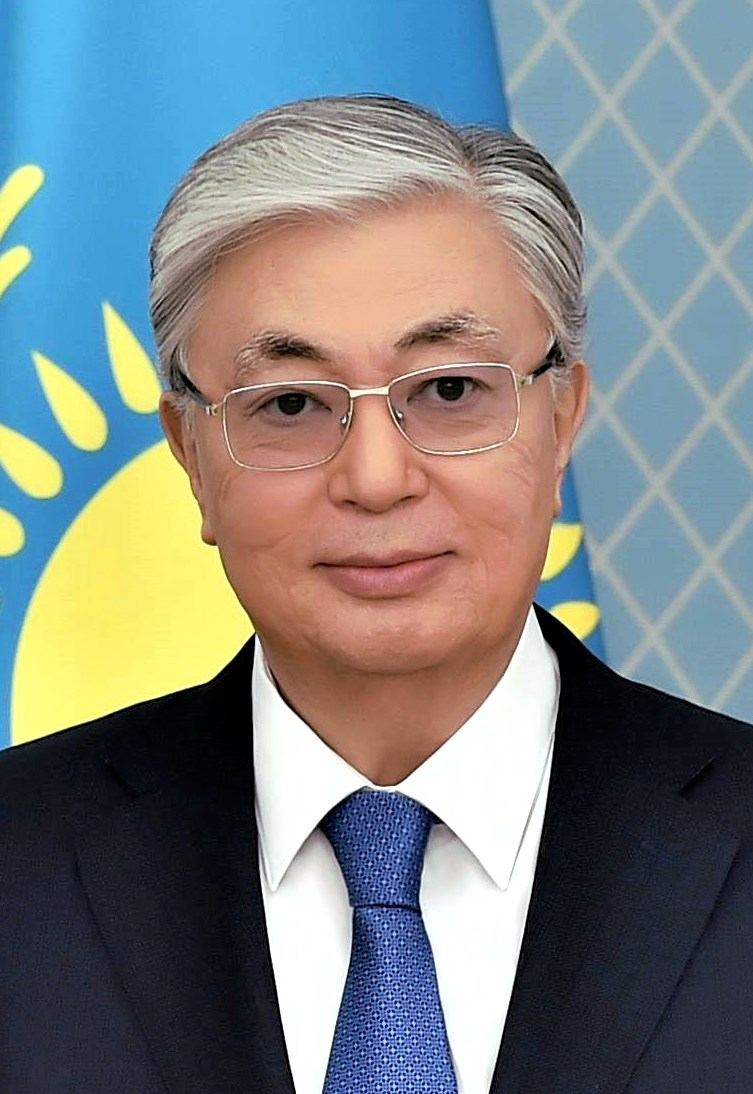
Kassym-Jomart Tokayev, President of the Republic of Kazakhstan

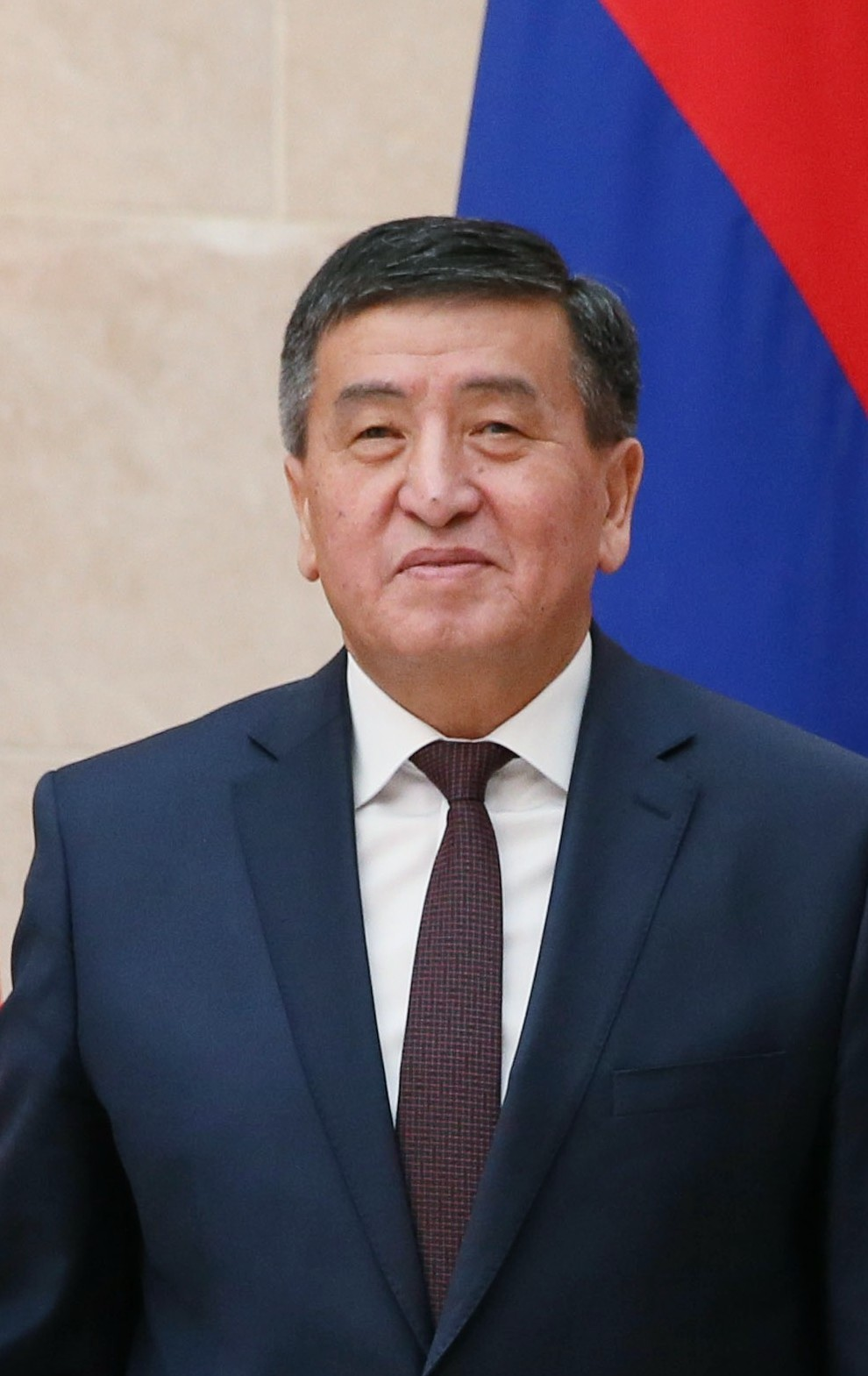
Sooronbay Jeenbekov, President of the Kyrgyz Republic

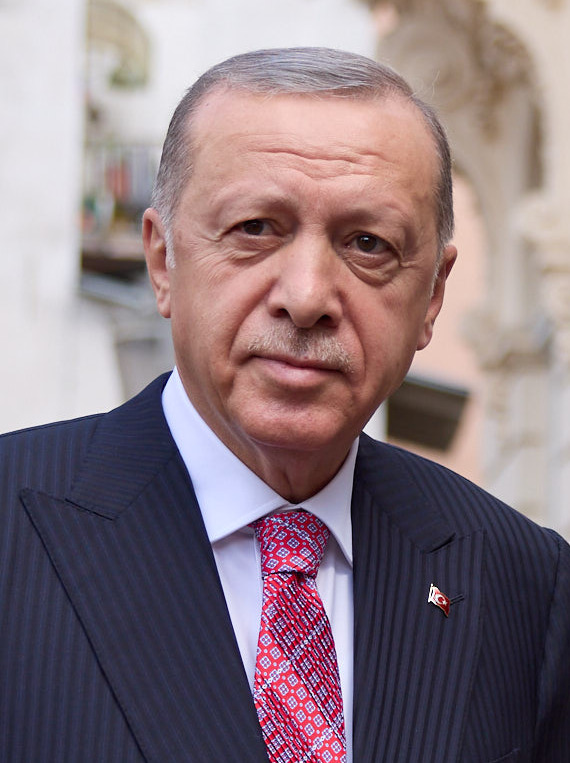
Recep Tayyip Erdoğan, President of the Republic of Turkey

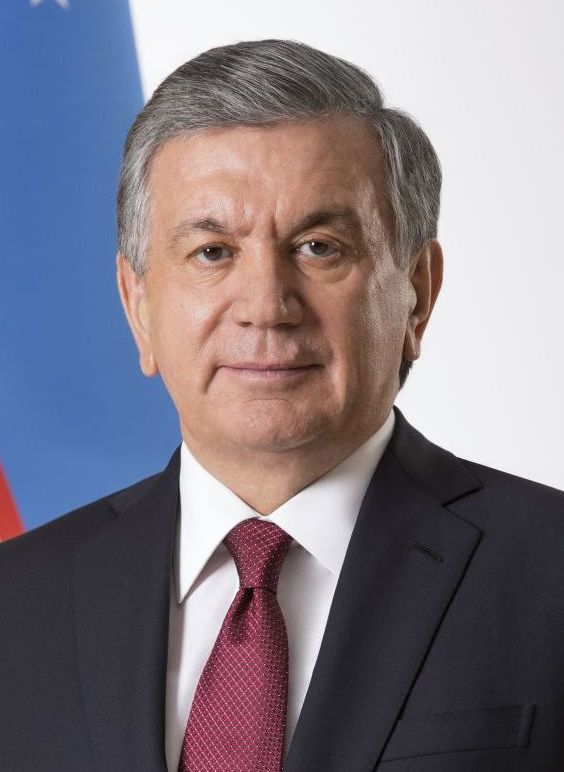
Shavkat Mirziyoyev, President of the Republic of Uzbekistan

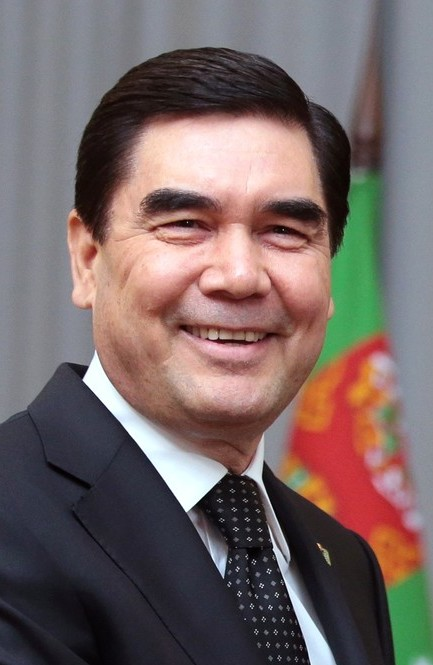
Gurbanguly Berdimuhamedow, President of Turkmenistan

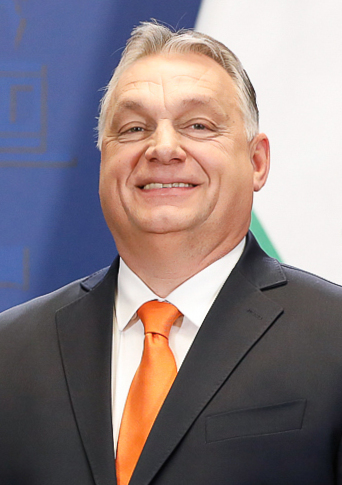
Viktor Orbán, Prime Minister of Hungary

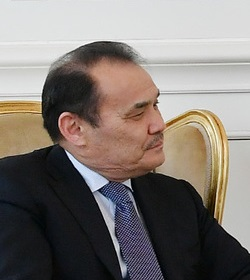
Baghdad Amreyev, Turkic Council Secretary General

== Informal Video Summit ==
An informal video summit was held on 31 March 2021. The theme was "Turkistan – A Spiritual Capital of the Turkic World". Turkistan is declared to be spiritual capital of Turkic World.

Participants

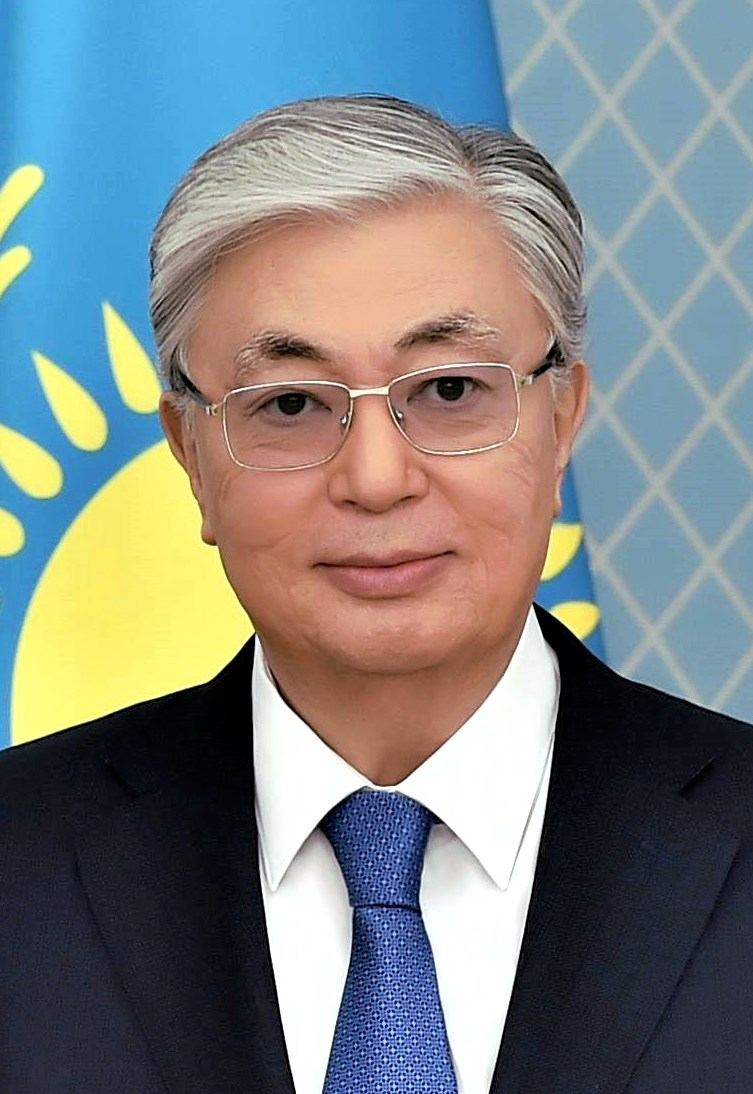
Kassym-Jomart Tokayev, President of the Republic of Kazakhstan

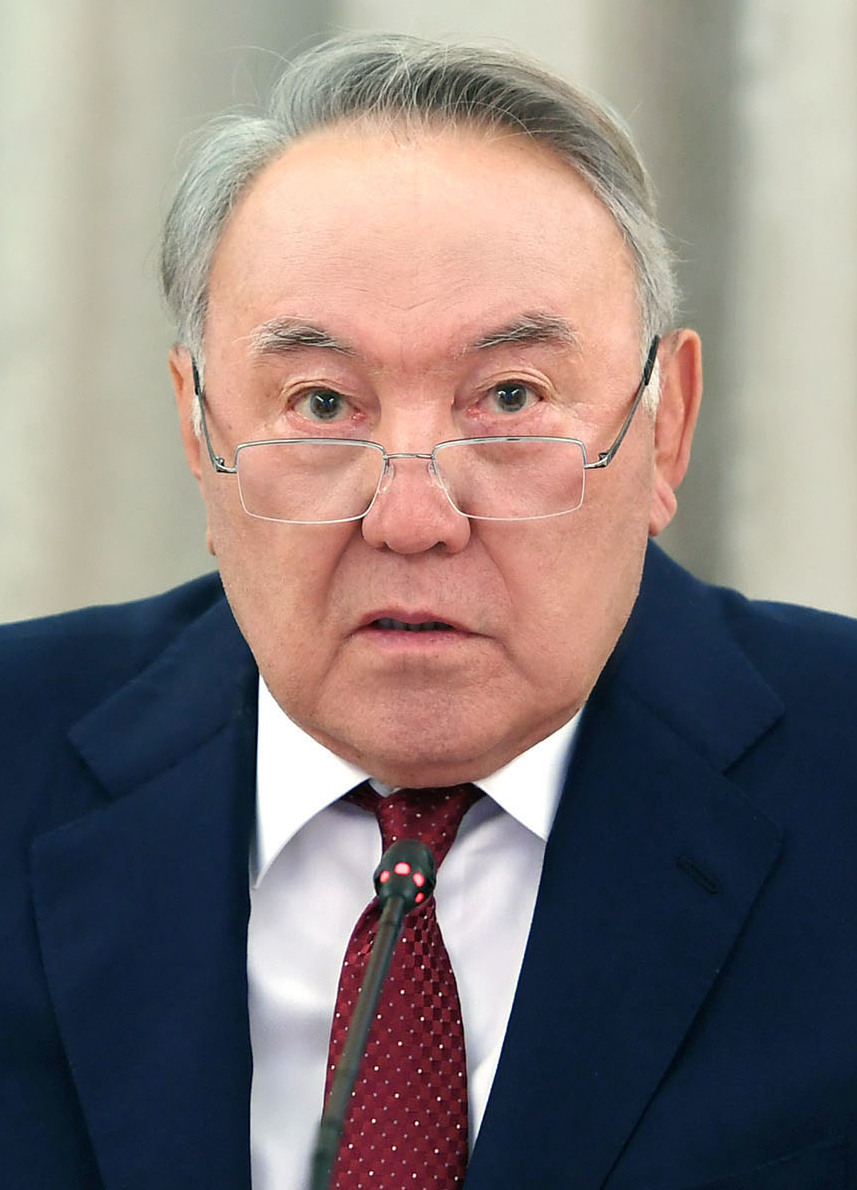
Nursultan Nazarbayev, First President of the Republic of Kazakhstan-Elbasy

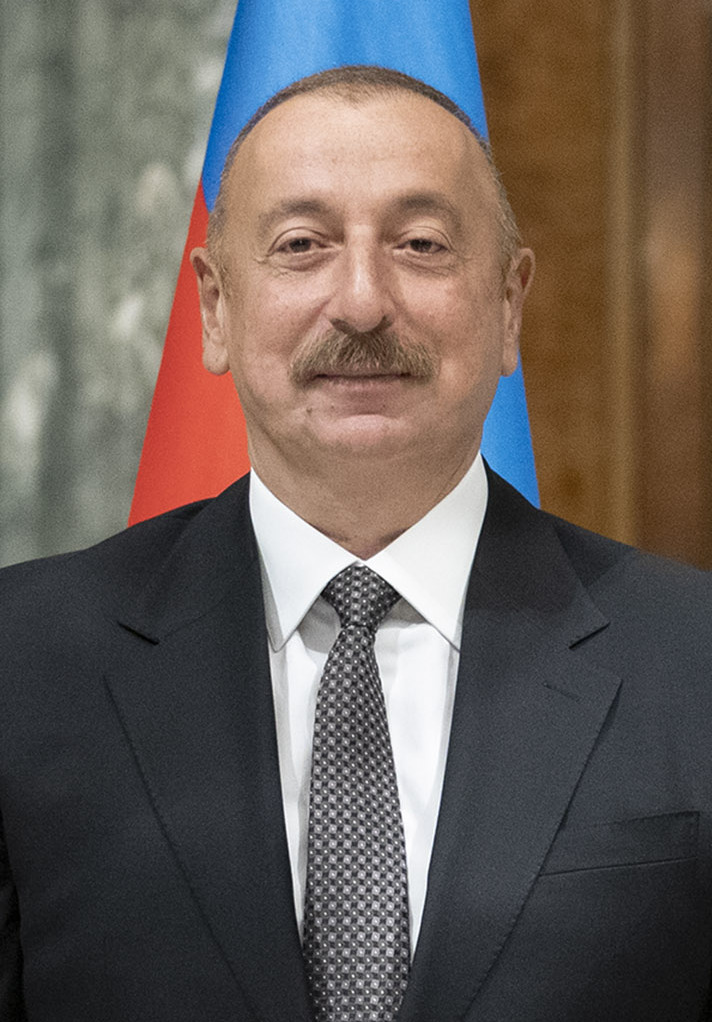
Ilham Aliyev, President of the Republic of Azerbaijan

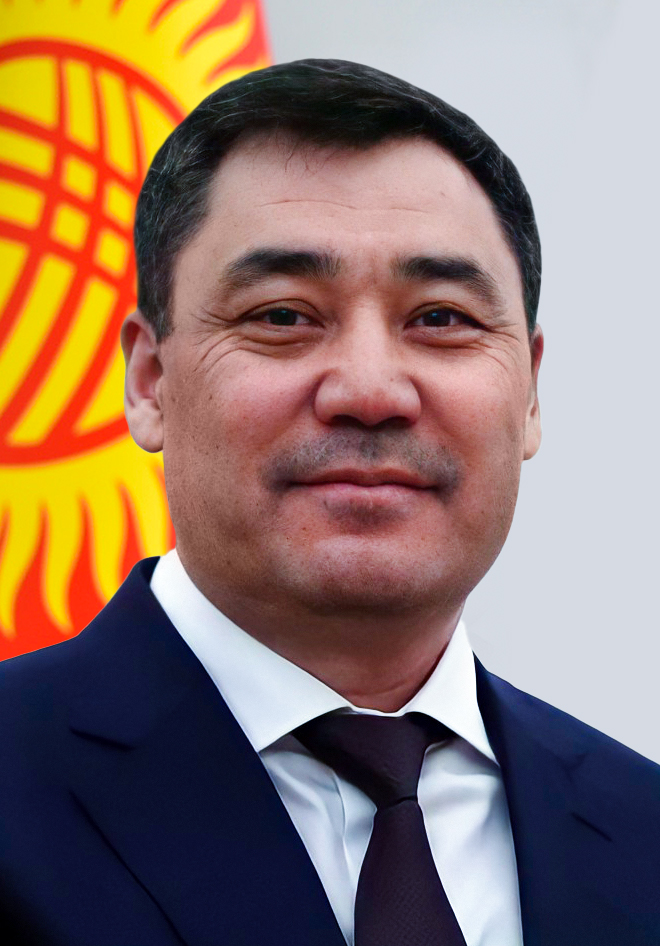
Sadyr Japarov, President of the Kyrgyz Republic

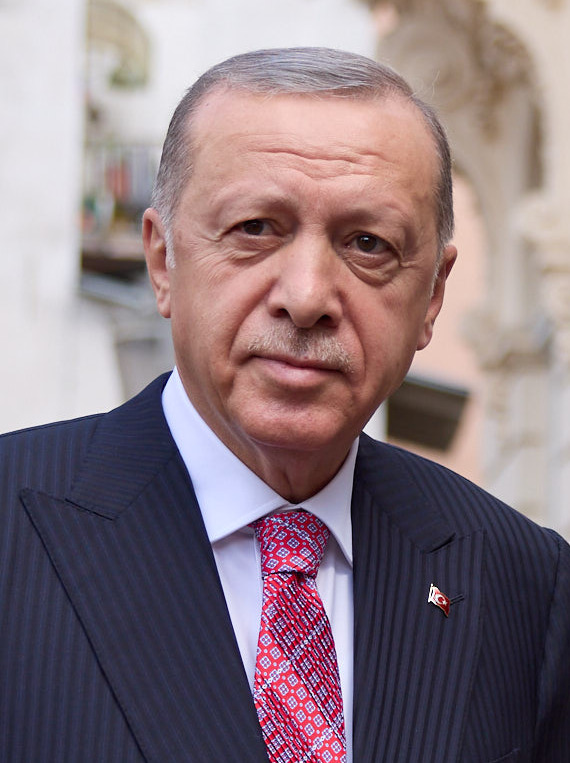
Recep Tayyip Erdoğan, President of the Republic of Turkey

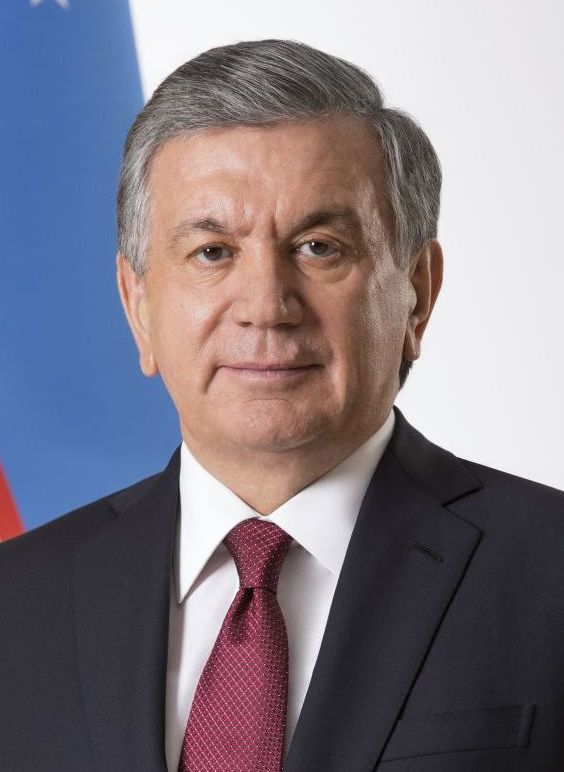
Shavkat Mirziyoyev, President of the Republic of Uzbekistan

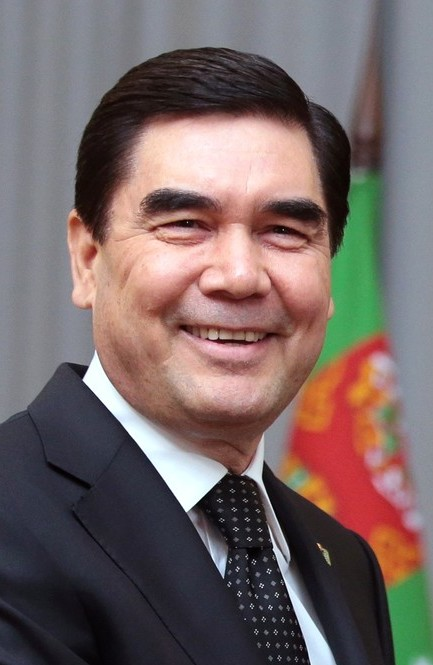
Gurbanguly Berdimuhamedow, President of Turkmenistan

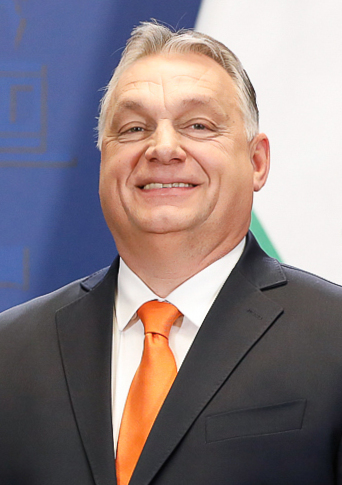
Viktor Orbán, Prime Minister of Hungary

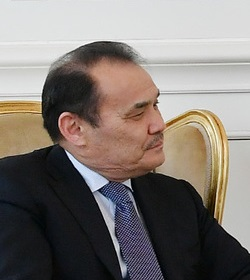
Baghdad Amreyev, Turkic Council Secretary General

== 8th summit ==
8th Turkic Council Summit
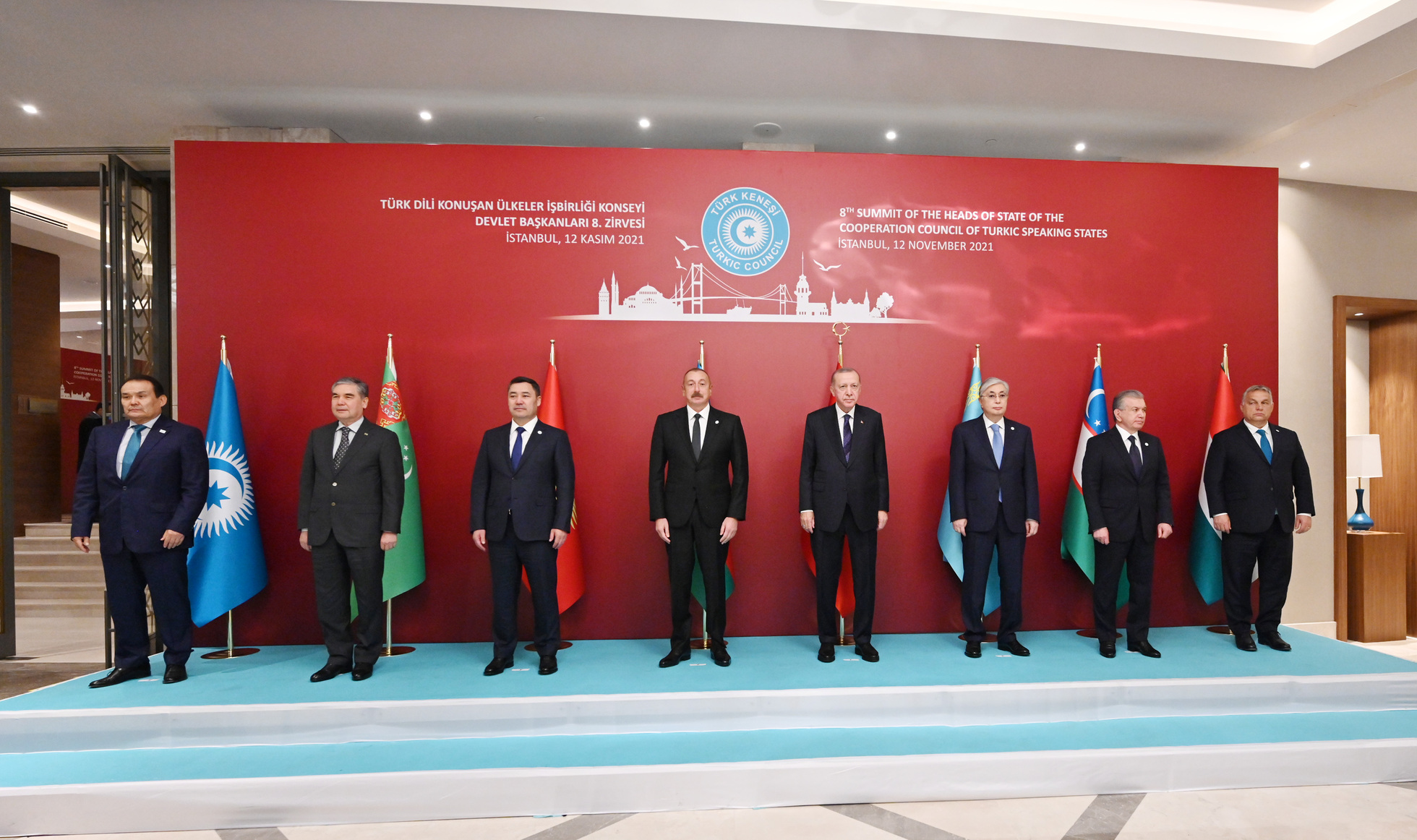
- Host country: Turkey
- Date: November 12, 2021
- Cities: Istanbul

Eighth (last) Turkic Council summit was held in Istanbul, Turkey on November 12, 2021. The theme was "Green Technologies and Smart Cities in the Digital Age". During the summit, leaders agreed to change organization's name to "Organization of Turkic States". Turkmenistan joined the organization as an observer. President of Azerbaijan Ilham Aliyev is awarded with "Supreme Order of Turkic World". Istanbul Declaration is announced at the end of the summit.

Summit was organized in Democracy and Freedom Island.

Participants

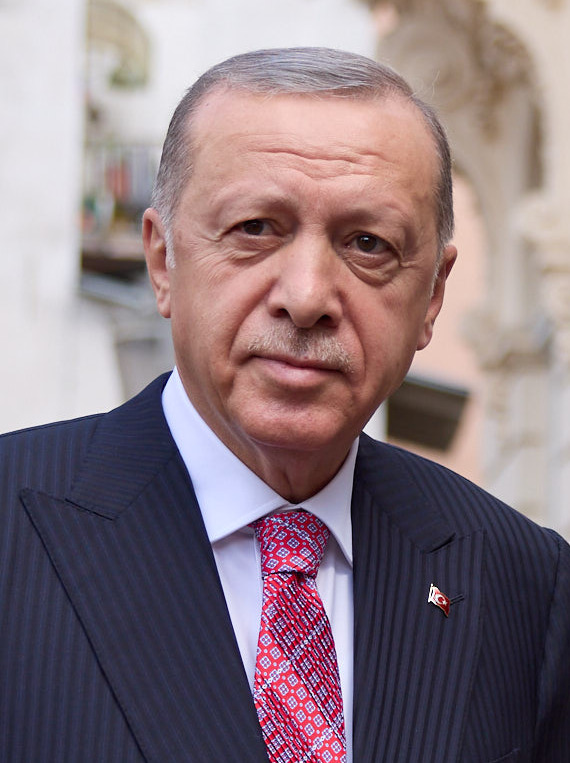
Recep Tayyip Erdoğan, President of the Republic of Turkey (Host)

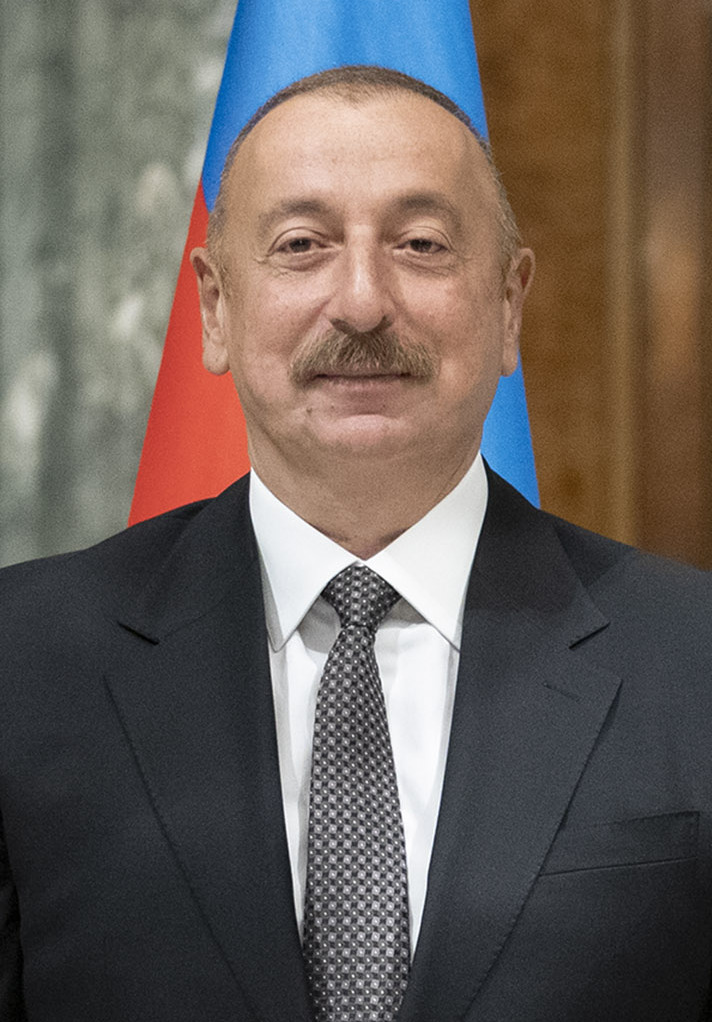
Ilham Aliyev, President of the Republic of Azerbaijan

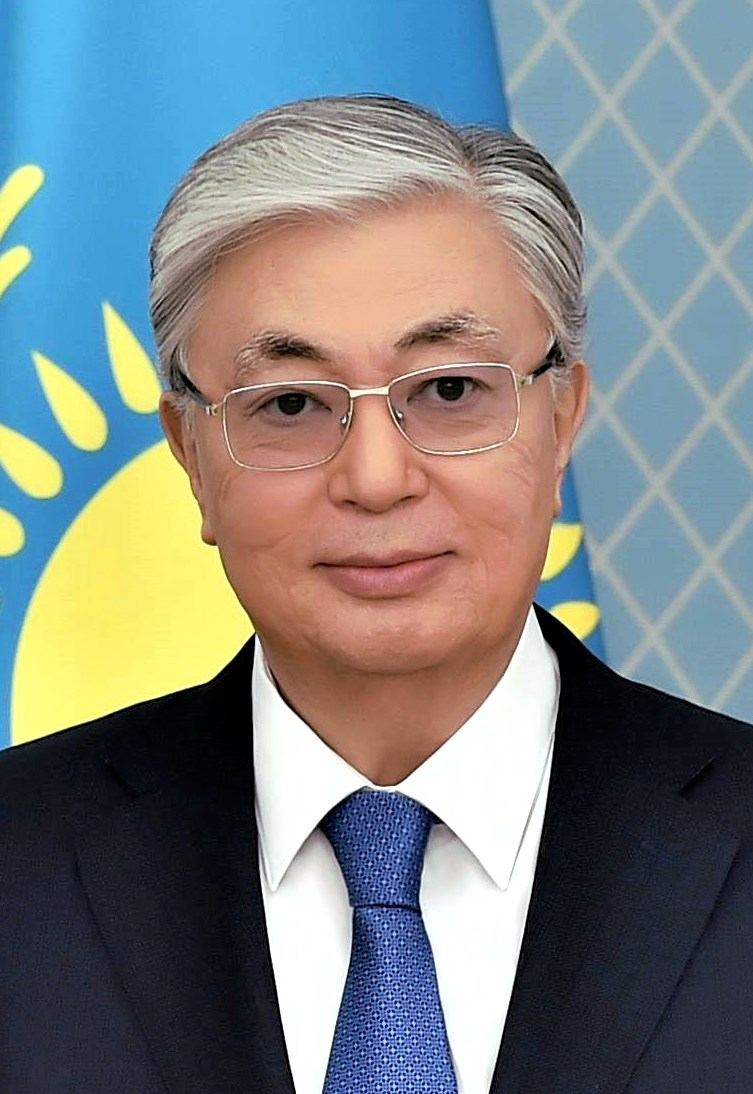
Kassym-Jomart Tokayev, President of the Republic of Kazakhstan

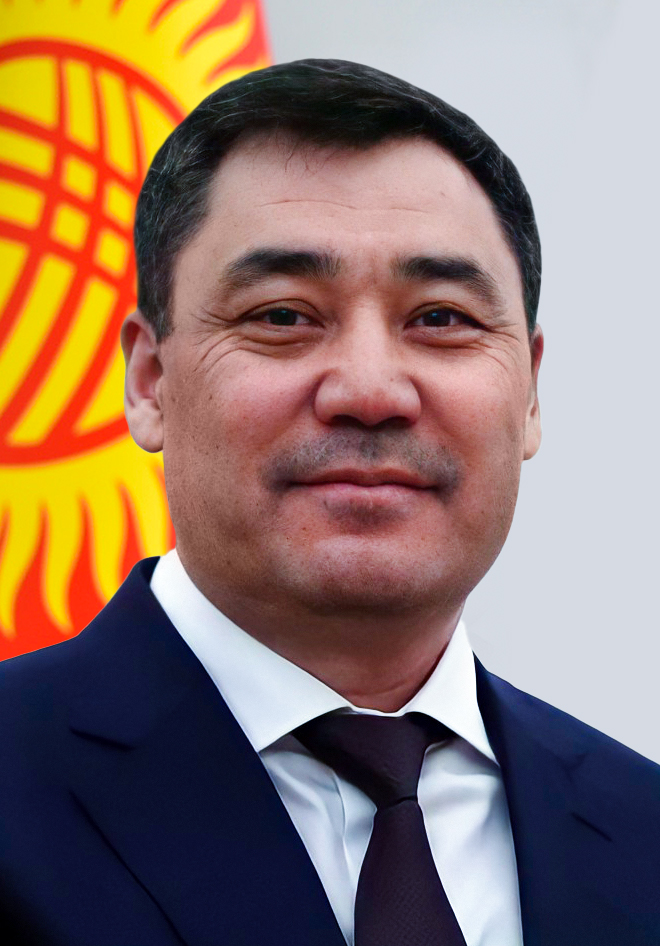
Sadyr Japarov, President of the Kyrgyz Republic

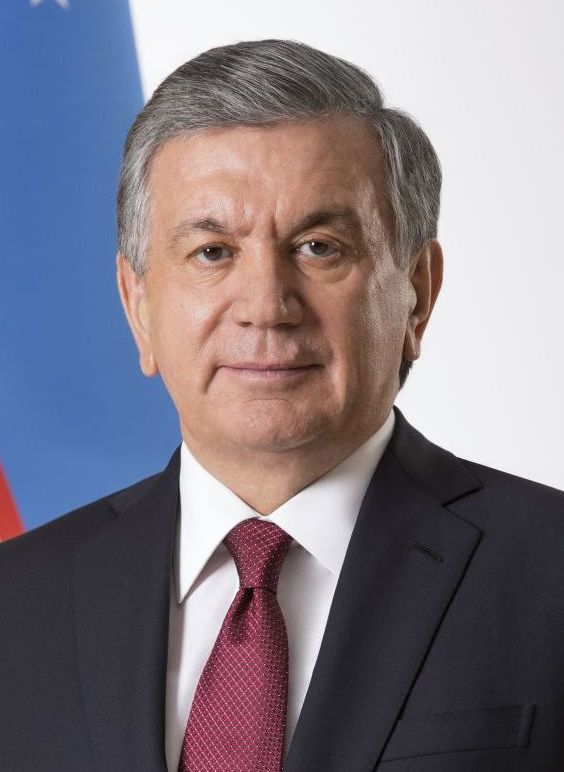
Shavkat Mirziyoyev, President of the Republic of Uzbekistan

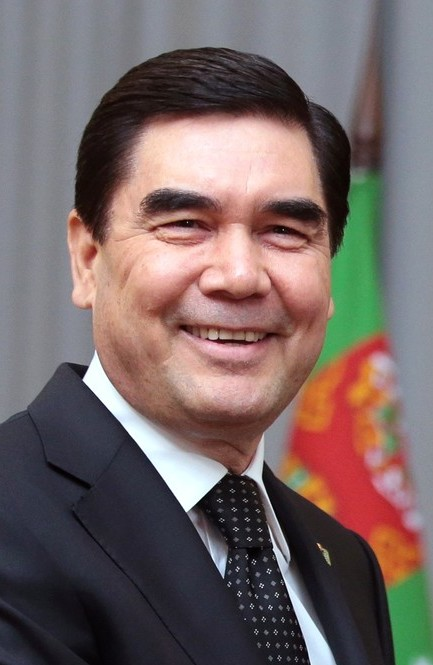
Gurbanguly Berdimuhamedow, President of Turkmenistan

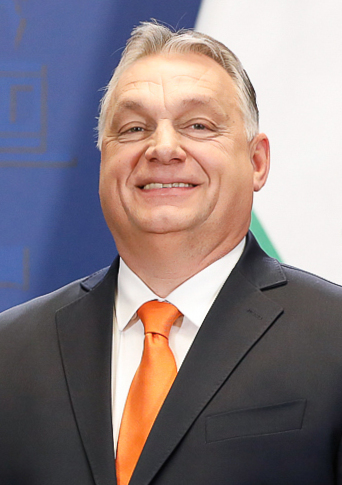
Viktor Orbán, Prime Minister of Hungary

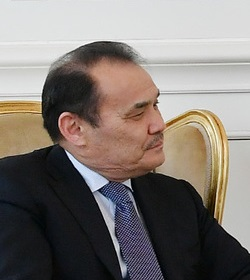
Baghdad Amreyev, Turkic Council Secretary General

Additionally, Nursultan Nazarbayev, Honorary President of Turkic Council, send a video message to the summit.
