= Politics of Asia =

Topic in international political science

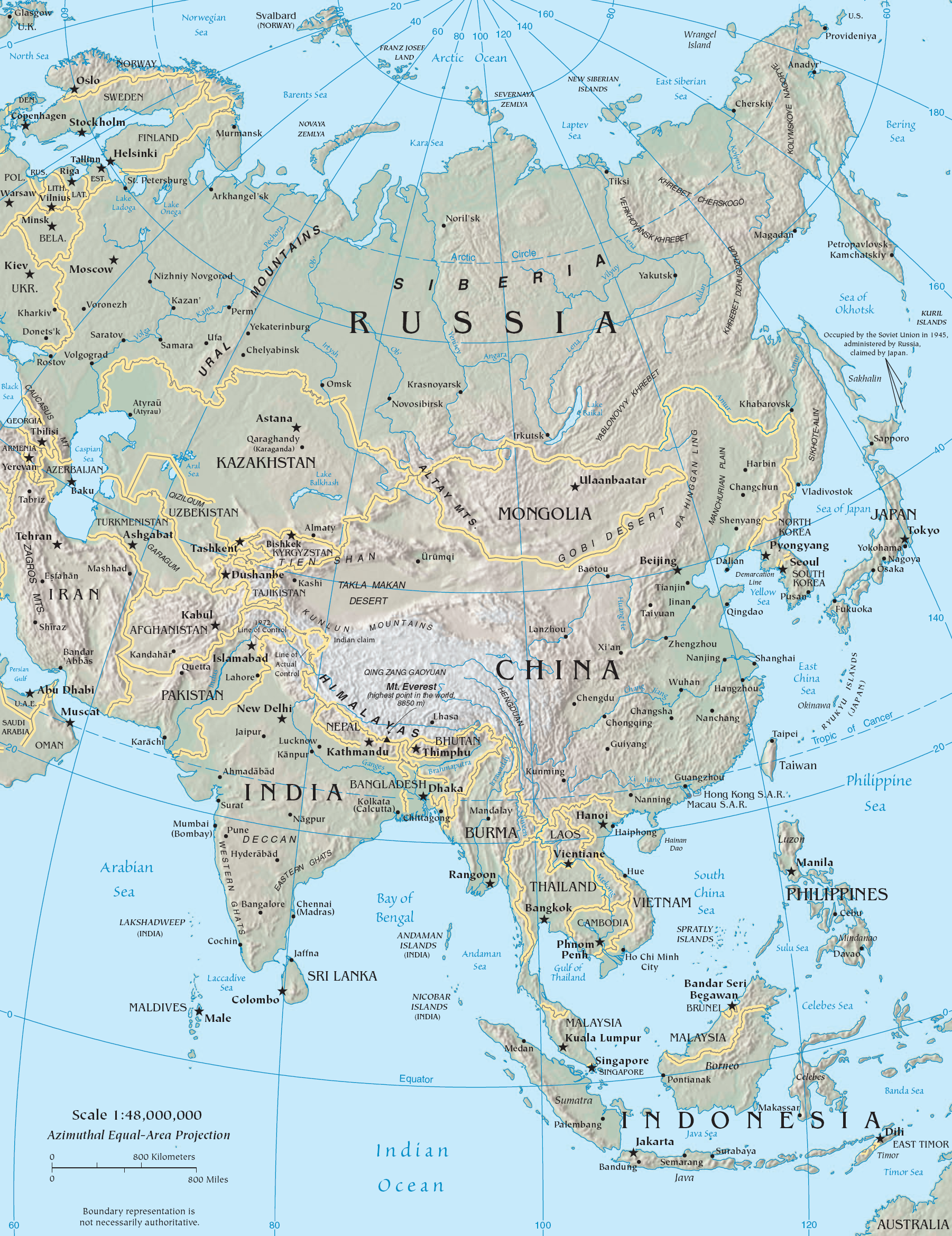
Map of Asia.

The politics of Asia are extremely varied as would be expected of such a large landmass and a diverse population. Constitutional monarchies, absolute monarchies, one-party states, federal states, dependent territories, liberal democracies and military dictatorships are all factors in the region, as well as various forms of independence movements.

Civilization has a long history throughout Asia and it probably involved politics right from the start although some of the earliest discernible political structures arose in Mesopotamia with the advent of writing offering details of these politics. A large and well organized civil service the like of which arose in China is also a necessary adjunct to politics. Much of the political climate in Asia today is affected by colonialism and imperialism of the past with some states retaining close links with their former colonial governors while others involved in bitter independence struggles the consequences of which continue to be felt.

The current situation is still mixed, with hostilities in parts of Asia such as the continuing tensions over South China Sea, Kashmir, Taiwan, Tibet, North Korea, South Korea as well as economic competitiveness between China and India. China and India do not have a peace treaty, nor do Russia and Japan or North Korea and South Korea. However, there are also moves towards greater co-operation and communication within the region with Association of Southeast Asian Nations (ASEAN) a notable example.

== History ==
- Asian Socialist Conference (1953-1960)
- History of civil-military relations in Southeast Asia

== International alliances ==
- Asia-Pacific Economic Cooperation
- Association of Southeast Asian Nations
- Asia Cooperation Dialogue
- Commonwealth of Independent States
- International Conference of Asian Political Parties
- Eurasian Economic Union
- Organization of Turkic States
- Shanghai Cooperation Organisation
- South Asian Association for Regional Cooperation
- South Asia Free Trade Agreement

== Asia Council ==
The Asia Council is a pan-continental initiative launched in 2016 to achieve greater unity among countries of Asia. The first Asia Council summit was scheduled to be held in 2018 at Tokyo. Apart from the summit and periodical ministerial meetings, the various Asia Council forums brings together Asia’s top leadership under one roof to deliberate on pan-Asian issues.

== See also ==
- Culture of Asia
- Economy of Asia
- Geography of Asia
- History of Asia
- List of conflicts in Asia
- List of Asia-related topics
- OSCE countries statistics
- Pan-Asianism
- Orientalism
- Regions of Asia
- Democracy in Asia
