= History of civil–military relations in Southeast Asia =

Civil–military relations in Southeast Asia vary from nation to nation, but possess consistent themes in military dominance and control in several sectors of every country's secular operations. In several Southeast Asian countries, such as Indonesia and Thailand, the military exerts its influence in economic affairs as well, with former military officials running many vital corporations and industries in both nations. In the broadest sense, the way that military command corresponds to civil governance, and in particular how the military potentially possesses executive power in these different countries, comprises this area of interest.

In Southeast Asia, the various states possess fairly different forms of governance and military control. In Vietnam, Singapore, and Malaysia, there is a fair amount of civilian control. Meanwhile, Myanmar is an example of a completely different case, where the military possesses nearly absolute control. Thailand, Indonesia, and the Philippines provide a more middle-ground view, where there is a degree of civil–military relations that hinge on both parties’ cooperation.

Some scholars oppose the relationship between the military and the economy, preferring to see the two entities completely separated and independent on the basis that military control of the economy can completely hamper civilian control in governmental processes and decision-making. While attempts at democracy have been made in the region, some sources believe that they have not been substantial or whole-hearted enough.

The extent of military power in a nation's economy can extend to numerous sectors and include military control over something as large as a corporation, or even on an individual level in which soldiers seek to reap profits for themselves.

== History ==
After World War II, several new states within the region began to regain power or emerge altogether. Yet these collection of states were ultimately frail and weak, viewed as susceptible to coups or any forms of military intervention. In the mid-20th century, many of these countries were susceptible to multiple coups and insurgencies in the aftermath of World War II. In many of these cases, the governments responded with military action in order to maintain stability and overthrow those who were seeking to harm the political regime.

=== Indonesia ===
During World War II, when Japan had occupied Indonesia, the nation had finally received some form of sovereignty and self-control when the Dutch had assigned Indonesians to posts that only Dutch officials had formerly controlled . Later, when anti-Japanese sentiments were much more prominent in the country because of the brutal measures that the Japanese military was taking, the country declared its independence on August 17, 1945, at 10:00 A.M.

The military struggle after Indonesia's declaration of independence essentially helped the evolution of the armed forces in the nation. At one point a nascent entity, the Indonesian military had to expel the Dutch from their nation in order to protect their new sovereignty and fundamentally establish their independence from the Dutch occupiers.

A rivalry later between the Indonesian Communist Party (PKI) and Major General Suharto resulted in a military coup in which Suharto would gain a substantial amount of power over the Indonesian government. As part of his regime, he hoped to further destroy the boundary between military and civilian leadership, effectively usurping power from the civilian aspect of government in favor of bolstering the military's influence. This new regime led by Suharto would last from the coup in 1965 until 1998, when many Indonesians were disillusioned by poor economic conditions and the many changes that the military was making in the wake of the Asian financial crisis during that era.

At one point in history, Indonesia's military was one of the most powerful in Southeast Asia. Under dwifungsi, a concept that entails that the military should possess an active role in both politics and business, many Indonesian military officials believed that they had a right to divulge some of their investments into economic and political ventures.

=== Vietnam ===
Much of Vietnam's military history can be traced back to the Nguyen Dynasty. The Emperor Gia Long in 1802 defeated all of his opponents and for the first time managed to unify the country. At this time, the army dominated most of the state's activities and the government, allowing for a legacy of military rule as a precedent for the nation's history. French control in the country essentially diminished the control that the military had, but nearly all power at the time was delegated to military officials and for military expenditure.

At first, the Vietnamese army remained underemployed in Southern Vietnam, and in order to capitalize on this, several military figures had a very active political presence. Indeed, under President Diem, military officials who focused solely on military matters were never promoted nor given special attention or treatment; only the officers who focused on the political facet of their positions were able to be promoted and move up in the ranks. President Diem would later be removed from power after a military coup.

In Vietnam, the Vietnam People's Army (VPA) at first possessed numerous small farms and other small ventures in order to fund their propagation. Over time, however, their jurisdiction involved greater, more fiscally stressing projects such as construction and development. Later, the VPA aimed to make these military corporations more efficient by setting up economic defense zones in every region of the country.

Later, the military was involved in numerous reconstruction projects that ranged from different industries such as agriculture, industry, communications, and transport. In 1993, nearly 70,000 soldiers had full-time employment in a wide array of commercial enterprises, and local militia had allegedly set up roughly 160 enterprises as well, with construction and repair being among the most popular businesses that soldiers engaged in.

Between 1988 and 1993, the army size was cut in half, and the defense budget was slashed by two-thirds. The Vietnamese Communist Party (VCP) attempted to shift the focus of the VPA toward national development and encourage more economic projects, a movement that was sparked in 1986 and dubbed doi moi. Military-owned enterprises were the most notable outcome of this new policy approach.

One venture of note involved the VPA's creation of its Special Operations Unit, which attempted to engage in gemstone mining while simultaneously defending various mining sites and projects. By 1993, there were estimated to be over 300 army-run commercial businesses in Vietnam, each completing a variety of tasks. One such initiative included army-run factories that assisted in the production of a variety of commodity goods, a business that only increased in activity and productivity in the early 1990s, as various army enterprises attempted to create a greater variety of goods that ranged from televisions, computers, and raincoats.

=== Myanmar ===
Much of Myanmar's early history is reflective of quite a productive military presence; many of the earlier kings were military leaders.

The territory of the kingdom of Burma was taken over by the British in three wars and incorporated into British India. Burma regained her sovereignty on January 4, 1948, following decades of anti-colonial resistance, after Aung San, the leader of Burma's independence movement, and the Labour government in London, agreed on a peaceful transfer of power in the Aung San-Attlee Agreement.

After gaining independence, the Burmese army began to view the Israeli military with admiration and hoped to emulate their model. Particularly of interest to the Burmese were Israel's universal registration and civilian military service programs.

In modern history, Myanmar is the only country in the Southeast Asian region that possesses a purely military regime that simultaneously controls the political arena. Contrary to the constitution's language, which seemed to propose a democratic form of governance, military dominance became the norm in the country, leaving little room for civilian cooperation in governmental affairs. Reorganization efforts lead to state building, which involved rebuilding the military and organizing and channeling resources. Because the military is the dominant political force in the country, civil services and political parties are not very evident or widespread in Myanmar. Despite the fact that there were elections held in 2010, the military still held the power to nominate its representatives to 25% of the seats in parliament.

There are, however, factions within the military power that all vie for political dominance. With the civilian aspect of joint-governance absent, unlike in other countries in the region, nearly all dissent and power struggles emerge from the military.

=== Singapore ===
In the mid-20th century, there were many British officials in Singapore, and many within the country believed that it would be unnecessary to invest heavily in defense in the near-future. However, once British forces withdrew from Singapore, the country turned to model Israel's method of defense in order to protect itself externally. Thus, the country adopted universal conscription, a method that would provide a low-budget military while simultaneously allowing resources to pool into alternative uses such as economic development.

The People's Action Party (PAP) additionally sought further measures in their Total Defence concept. This theory consisted of five separate philosophies to help aid security measures: military, civil, economic, social, and psychological. The defense and well-being of Singapore, then, was reliant not only on the military presence and power, but also on civilian leadership and collaboration with the military.

=== Thailand ===
While military presence in Thailand was not always conspicuous, it really started to fully develop in the late 19th and early 20th centuries. Prior to this period, the military served a fairly ceremonial role rather than a defensive one. By 1915, however, the Thai military grew to roughly 30,000 soldiers, with total expenditure on national defense growing to include nearly one-quarter of the Thai budget.

After a military coup in 1932, commoners and other Thai were finally given a chance to ascend the ranks in military posts. Up to the coup, nearly half of all officers were a part of the royal family, but afterwards, this figure dropped to 3 percent, with more commoners receiving higher ranks and a greater representation of the Thai people on a geographical basis becoming more involved in military affairs. A large number of military developments after the coup sprouted as well, including an initiative to increase the size of the Thai navy substantially.

In the more modern era, Thai military officials now have a fairly substantial role in the political arena. These officials believe that the fate of the nation depends upon them, and that they are justified in their actions in displacing leaders, laws, and constitutions among other things, all in the name of upholding the best interests of the Thai nation and people.

In the 1980s, the military attempted to bring civilian leaders into more positions of power while still remaining at the forefront of state activity. This plan, however, was a guise to simply have the democratic reform in the country perceive that there was an increase in civilian participation in government along with a desired reduction in military influence. The military, however, could then capitalize on its role in rural economic development and spread propaganda pertaining to the military's democratic role. The Thai military hoped to elude the civilian leadership and find different means of exerting their power and influence so that they could advance their agenda.

In 1990, however, civilian leadership in Thailand attempted to prove its dominance and control as the primary actor in the political scene, and with the crackdown on mass protests in the nation ensued, which culminated in the elimination of the civilian government Chatichai Choonhavan, the military's role in politics essentially diminished and left the foreground of the national political scene. The military still upheld its other duties as a defensive actor, but lost much of its political sway in the national scene.

Both the civilians and the military in Thailand have each shared power in modern Thai history, with one side gaining more influence while the other's diminishes only to have that balance shifted inevitably. Much of the nation's history has evolved from a series of coups that have upset the balance of power, either providing more influence directly to the military or conferring that power to civilian leadership.

=== Cambodia ===
The modern Cambodian army has emerged from the French forces that used to inhabit the region. At first the military was composed primarily of French soldiers, but by the mid-20th century, native Cambodians began to become more involved in the military. Guerilla units were commonly used in order to dispel local communists, but when Cambodia was granted complete independence in 1954 after the Geneva Agreement, guerrilla activity waned.

Because service in the armed forces is desirable in Cambodia, due to security, good compensation, and miscellaneous benefits, Cambodia never practiced conscription because many citizens volunteered their service.

Up until 1970, there was minimal involvement of the Cambodian military in political affairs. Because of the Vietnamese pressure on Cambodia in the early 1970s, greater foreign aid was requisite as the country was unable to sustain itself, and the United States pledged millions of dollars in aid in order to assist Cambodia. Yet this aid did little to alleviate fears or to quell the rising communist sentiments, so martial law was instituted in order to subdue the situation.

== Criticism of military influence in politics and the economy ==
In Indonesia, the military has influence over and controls numerous businesses, which provides the military with an outside source of additional, independent income. While the government passed legislation in 2004 that within five years, by 2009, the businesses would be transferred entirely to the hands of the government, or be shut down. According to some accounts, the failure to fully enact and enforce this law encumbers military accountability. Sagoeom Tamboen, a military spokesman in Indonesia, told sources that military reform is ongoing.

In Vietnam, some criticized the diversion of military interests toward business enterprise and away from defense, claiming that VPA involvement in reconstruction would ultimately harm the nation if there were threats to national security that were not receiving full attention. Yet not all were against this form of news in the country—in fact, a news agency even claimed that by enforcing the military regime and its economic control, national defense would ultimately be secured and become less of an issue. A panel later met in Vietnam to discuss not whether the effects of the military on the economy were worthwhile, but instead in order to find ways to produce more effective results with the military's involvement in economic affairs.

General criticism toward military intervention and involvement in economic affairs had led to the conclusion that military officers who are involved in government do not attempt to stimulate economic growth and change. In Indonesia and Thailand, attempts to increase economic growth have been given greater priority than a more equitable redistribution of income. However, military governments seem to provide stable and flexible systems, and perform fairly adequately in terms of stimulating and providing means for economic growth and expansion. Yet because the military attempts to gain extra income through these alternative economic ventures, these practices may culminate in corruption. There is no real transparent budget, leading to potential cases of fraud and inefficiencies.
