= Asia Council =

Pan-Asian organization

- Formation: 2016
- Type: Regional Forum
- Headquarters: Tokyo
- Location: Doha, Chengdu, Bangkok, Tokyo
- Region served: Asia
- Website: www.theasiacouncil.org

The Asia Council is a pan-Asian organization constituted in 2016 to serve as a continent wide forum to address Asia's key challenges and foster regional integration.

The Asia Council provides a permanent platform where heads of state, ministers, policymakers, experts and leaders from diverse field gather to deliberate on issues that affect Asia as a whole. It functions through a combination of an Annual Summit, Ministerial meetings and high-level specialized forums throughout the year focused on thematic issues like economic cooperation, climate change, regional security, biodiversity, counter-terror strategies, and intercultural dialogue.

The council has its headquarters in Tokyo and regional directorates in Doha, Chengdu and Bangkok.

== Organization ==
The Asia Council operates through the council headquarters in Tokyo, three regional directorates and country offices.

=== Administrative Divisions ===
The Asia Council is organized into three administrative divisions. The East Asia division has its regional directorate in Tokyo, the South Asia & South East Asia division has its regional directorate in Bangkok and the West Asia & Central Asia division has its regional directorate in Doha.

== Countries ==
The Asia Council covers 48 countries and 6 dependent territories.

== Fellowships ==
The Asia Council fellowship provides financial grant to students from Asian countries to study for a graduate degree in world's top universities.

=== Global Leaders Fellowship ===
The Asia Council Global Leaders Fellowship is an international graduate fellowship scheme which supports students with exceptional leadership qualities from 48 countries and 6 dependent territories of Asia to undertake graduate studies at some of world's top universities in United States and United Kingdom.

=== Asia Fellowship ===
The Asia Fellowship is an international graduate fellowship scheme which supports students with exceptional leadership qualities from 48 countries and 6 dependent territories of Asia to undertake graduate studies at Asia's top universities.

=== Einstein Fellowship ===
The Asia Council Einstein Fellowship is an international fellowship scheme which supports students with exceptional leadership qualities from 48 countries and 6 dependent territories of Asia to undertake study for a degree at Tokyo Institute of Technology, Nanyang Technological University, KAIST, Hong Kong University of Science and Technology, and Tsinghua University.

== Reports and Publications ==
The council's research and publishing division produces several reports on Asia including the Asia Security Report and Asia Statistical Report.

=== Asian Review ===
The Asian Review is a journal published by the Asia Council. It covers political, economic and strategic review of the continent.

== Events ==
=== Asia Roundtable ===
The Asia Roundtable is an international conference held by the Asia Council outside Asia. The meeting discusses in detail a single issue that is geopolitically significant for the Asian region. The conference is attended by regional leaders and policy experts.

=== Asia Security Dialogue ===
The Asia Security Dialogue is a bi-annual meeting held by the Asia Council on most pressing security issues relating Asia.

== See also ==
- Asia Cooperation Dialogue
- Association of Southeast Asian Nations
- East Asia Summit
- Shanghai Cooperation Organisation
- Asian Development Bank
