= Geography of Asia =

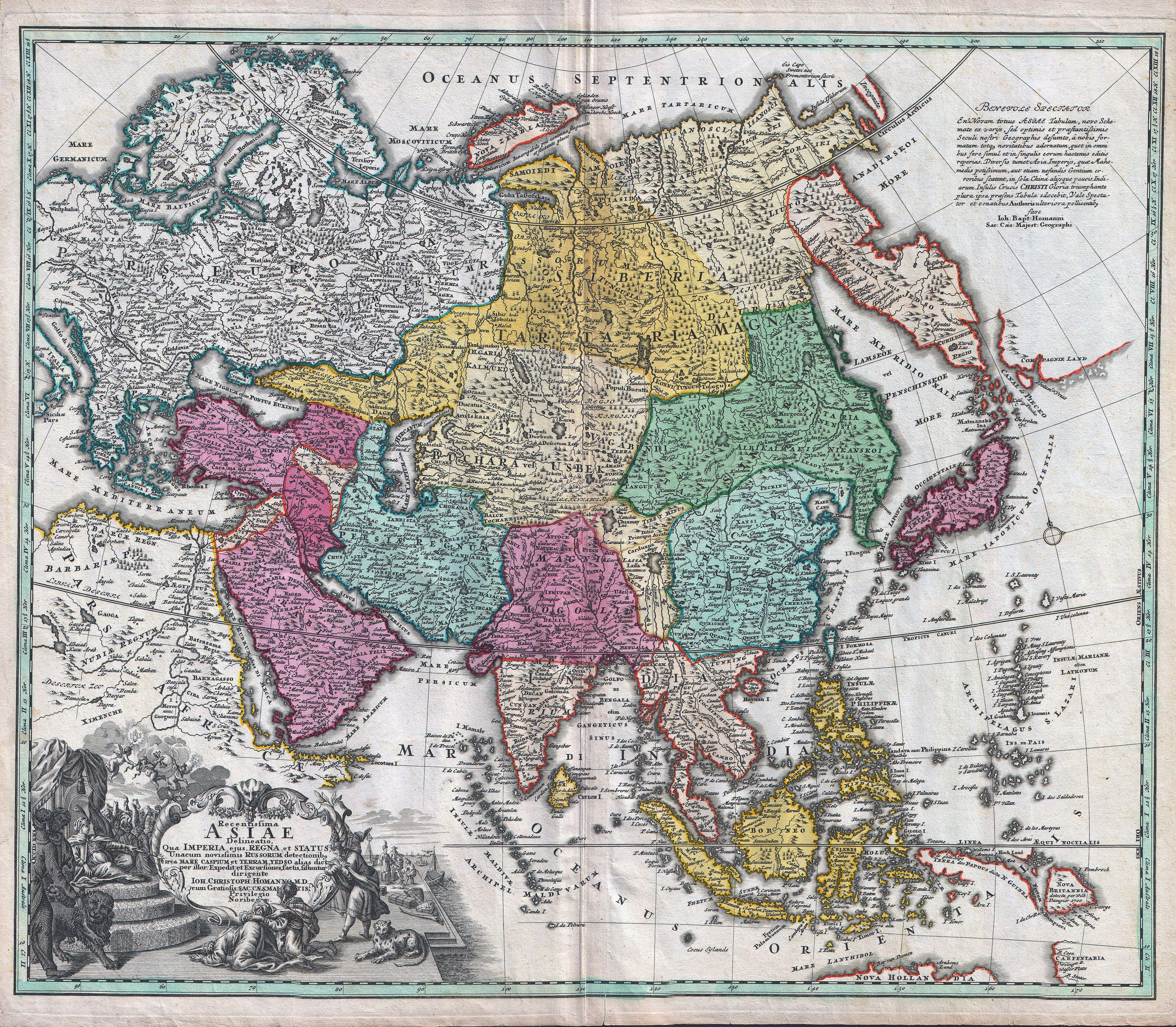
Recentissima Asiae Delineatio, the 1730 geographical map of Johan Christoph Homann. Asia is shown in color. The names are in Latin.

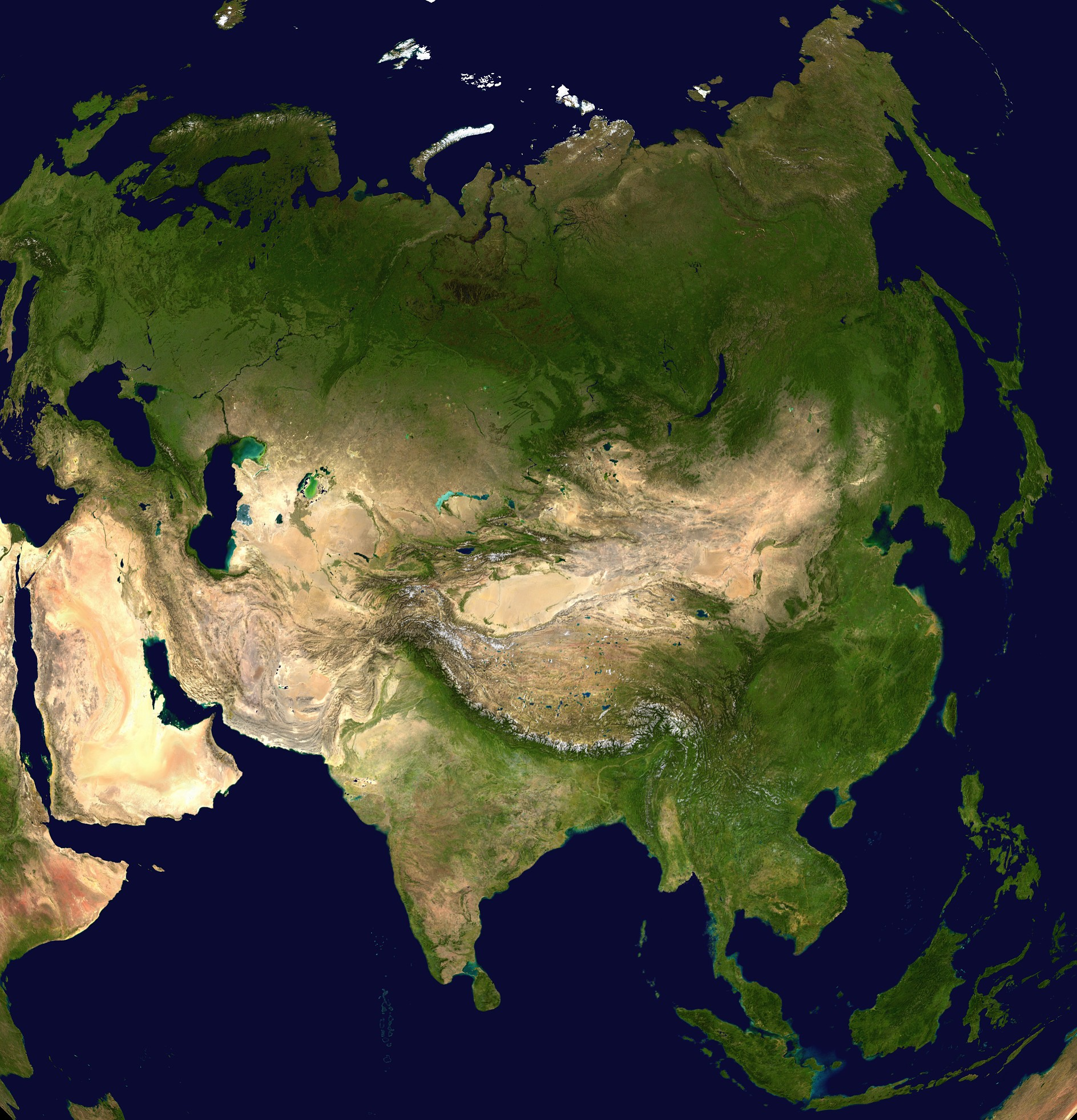
Satellite view of Asia

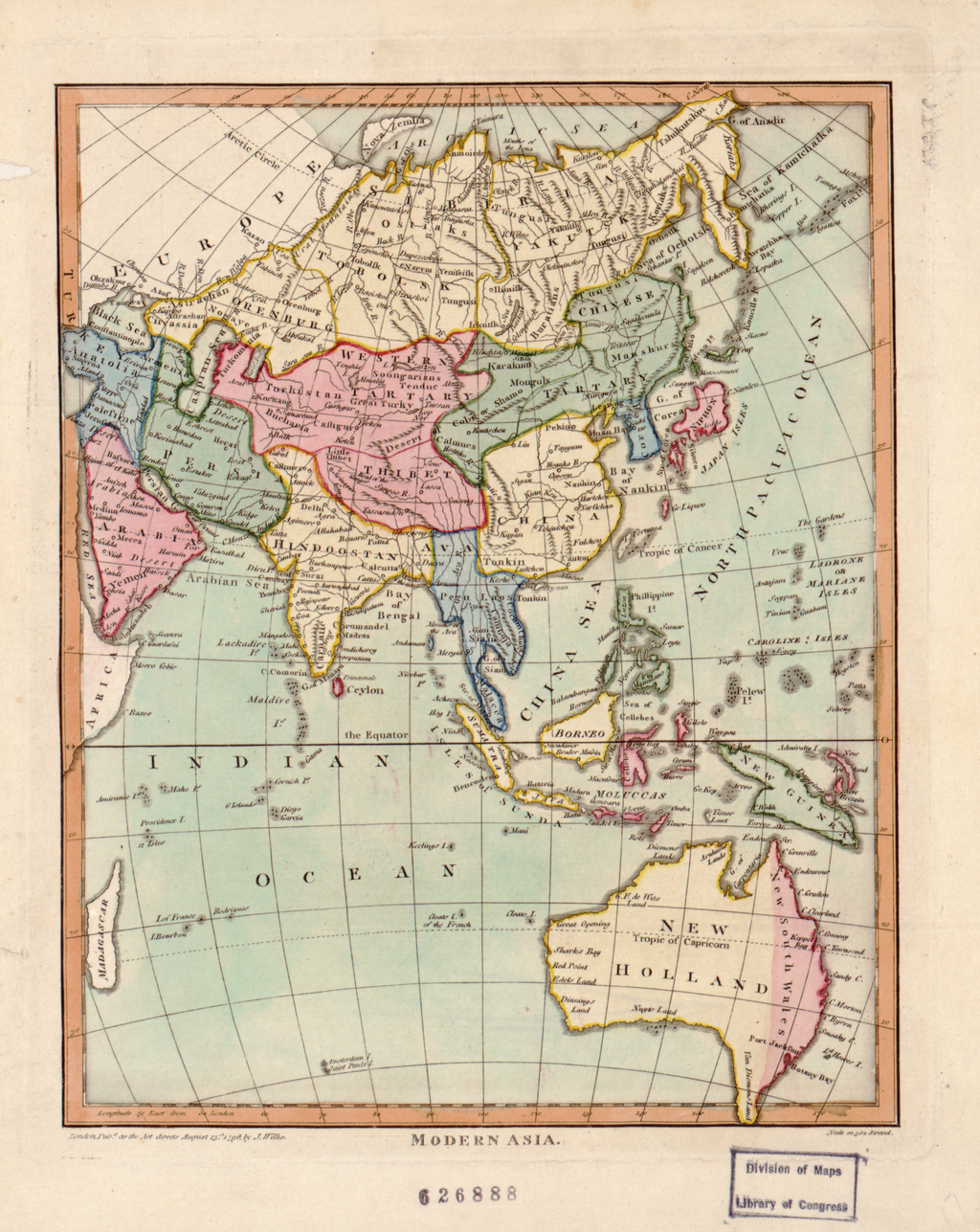

Geography of Asia reviews geographical concepts of classifying Asia, comprising 58 countries and territories.

== Geographical characteristics ==
=== Boundary ===
The area of Asia is not the sum of the areas of each of its regions, which have been defined independently of the whole. For example, the borders of South Asia and West Asia depend on who is defining them and for what purpose. These varying definitions are not generally reflected in the map of Asia as a whole; for example, Egypt is typically included in the Middle East, but not in Asia, even though the bulk of the Middle East is in Asia.

The demarcation between Asia and Africa is the Suez Canal, the Gulf of Suez, the Red Sea, and the Bab-el-Mandeb.

The border with Europe starts with the coast of the eastern Mediterranean, even though Turkey in the Near East extends partly into the Aegean Islands and includes Istanbul on the European side of the Bosphorus. On the north the boundary between the continents of Asia and Europe is commonly regarded as running through the Dardanelles, the Sea of Marmara, the Bosporus, the Black Sea, the Caucasus Mountains, the Caspian Sea, the Ural River to its source, and a long border generally following the eastern side of the Ural Mountains to the Kara Sea, Russia. The Arctic Ocean is the northern border. The Bering Straits divide Asia from North America.

On the southeast of Asia are the Malay Peninsula (the limit of mainland Asia) and Indonesia ("Isles of India", the former East Indies), a vast nation among thousands of islands on the Sunda Shelf, large and small, inhabited and uninhabited. Australia nearby is a different continent. The Pacific islands northeast of Australia more remotely removed from Japan and Korea are Oceania rather than Asia. From Indonesia the border runs along the Indian Ocean to the Red Sea. Most of the islands in the Indian Ocean are Asian.

=== Overall dimensions ===
Multiple sources give different estimates of the area enclosed by the imaginary border of Asia. The New York Times Atlas of the World gives 43,608,000 km^{2} (16,837,000 sq mi). Chambers World Gazetteer rounds off to 44,000,000 km^{2} (17,000,000 sq mi), while the Concise Columbia Encyclopedia gives 44,390,000 km^{2} (17,140,000 sq mi). The 2011 Pearson's has 44,030,000 km^{2} (17,000,000 sq mi). The methods of obtaining these figures and exactly what areas they include have not been divulged.

The map surface of mainland Asia is entirely contained within a Geodetic quadrangle formed from segments of latitude going through its north and south extremes and segments of longitude passing through the east and west extremes. Cape Chelyuskin is at 77° 43′ N; Cape Piai in the Malay Peninsula is at 1° 16′ N; Cape Baba in Turkey is at 26° 4′ E; Cape Dezhnyov is at 169° 40′ W; that is, mainland Asia ranges through about 77° of latitude and 165° of longitude, distances of about 8,560 km (5,320 mi) long by 9,600 km (6,000 mi) wide according to Chambers, or 8,700 km (5,400 mi) long by 9,700 km (6,000 mi) wide according to Pearson's.

Indonesia to the southeast, a nation consisting of thousands of islands, adds a significant amount of territory to mainland Asia and extends the extreme Asian latitude further south. The geographic nature of the country raises such questions as whether the sea and the seabed count as Asia. The Australia–Indonesia border is still being negotiated. Currently, a 1997 treaty remains unratified. As there are questions of fishing rights in the waters and mineral rights in the seabed, two different boundaries are being negotiated, one for the water column and one for the seabed. The southernmost seabed boundary is 10° 50' S, the latitude of Point A3, the Australia, Indonesia and Papua New Guinea common tripoint. The southernmost water column boundary is still further south at Point Z88, 13° 56' 31.8".

== European views of Asia ==
=== Geographical or traditional view ===
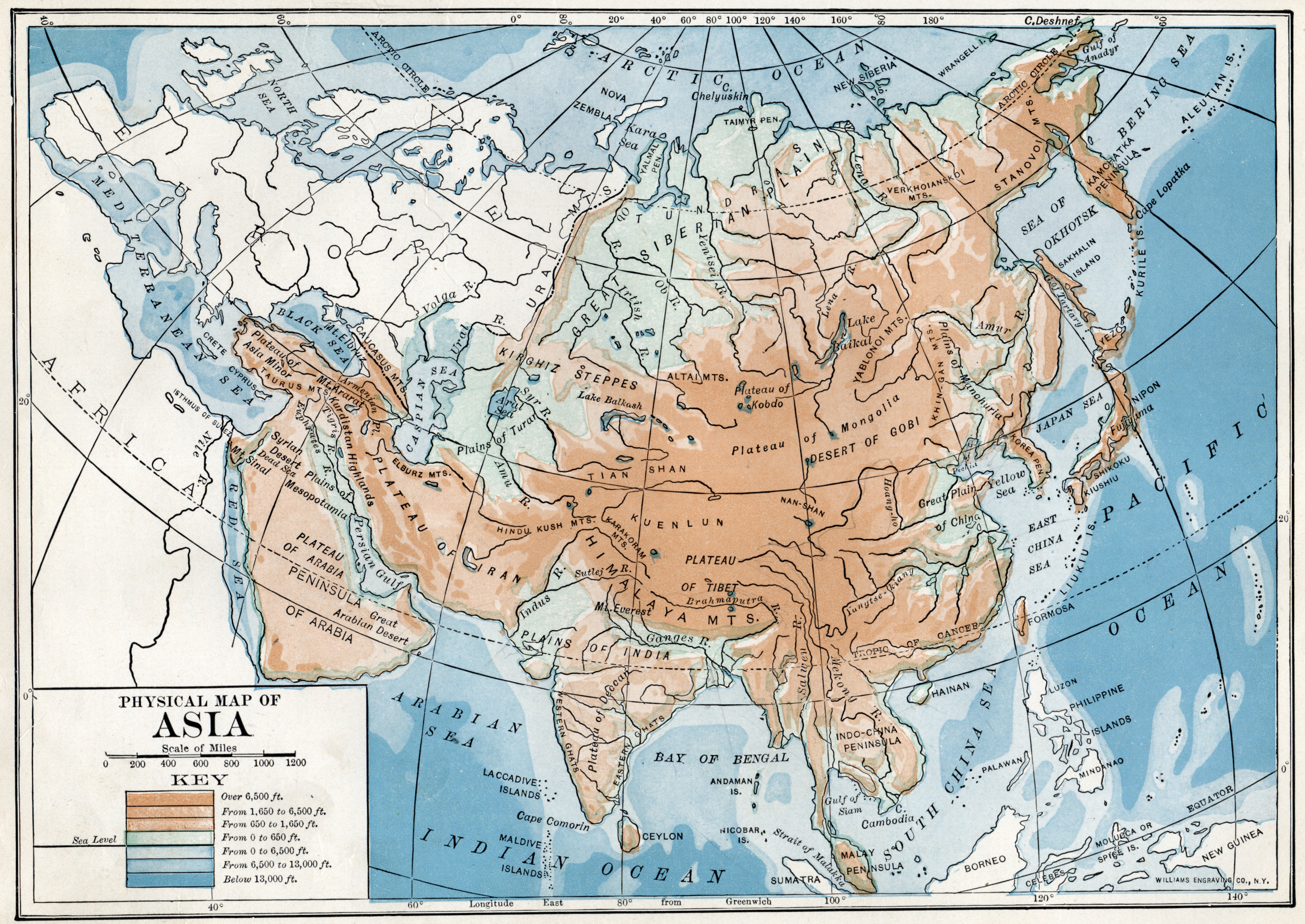
A 1916 physical map of Asia by Tarr and McMurry

Medieval Europeans considered Asia as a continent, a distinct landmass. The European concept of the three continents in the Old World goes back to classical antiquity. Definition of continents has long been and remains primarily the realm of geographers, including cultural geographers as well as physical geographers. A wide majority of geographers, in nearly all atlases and many other publications from National Geographic to the CIA World Factbook and Merriam-Webster's Geographical Dictionary, define Europe, Asia, and Africa as continents.

==== Hellenic origin ====
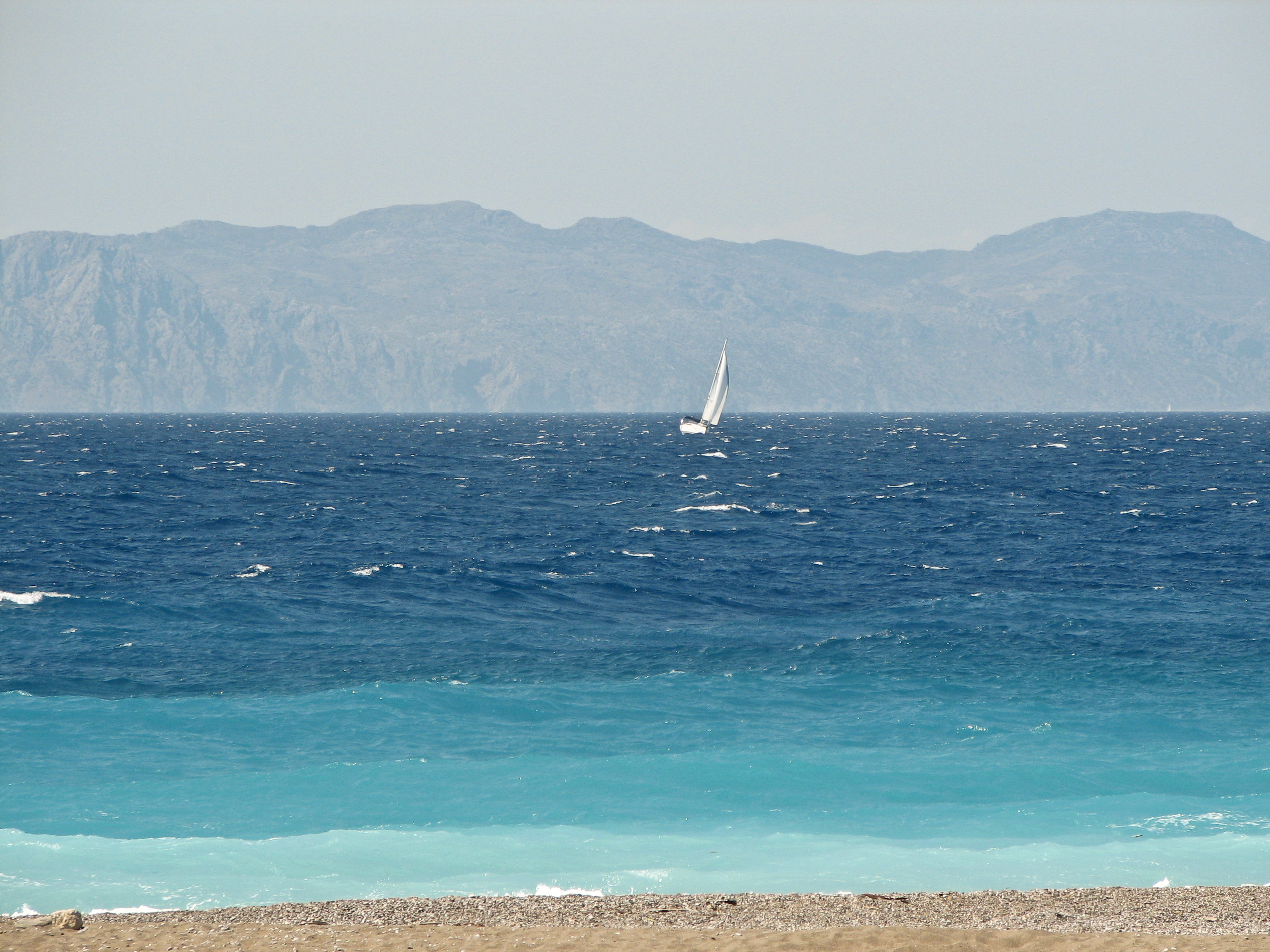
The coast of Turkey, original Asian shore seen from a beach on Rhodes

The three-continent system was an idea devised in Archaic Greece, a time of Greek colonial expansion and trade throughout the Mediterranean and the spread of writing again. Writing is a prerequisite of written geography. It had been lost during the preceding Greek Dark Ages, a period of piracy at sea and defensive parochialism on land. The preceding Mycenaean Greece left scant record of some serving women from a locality in the later Asia Minor called Asia. Europe was mainly Greece, while Libya was a small region to the west of Egypt. There was no systematic definition of "continent;" however, the Greek mariners did make a distinction that was to become one: the islands, nēsoi, versus the mainland, ēpeiros. One etymology relates ēpeir- to the same Indo-European root from which English "over" came. The Armenian form means "bank, coast." The Greek form must be some sort of "overland," whether continuous land or a coast that looms over. In Latin it became continens terra, "the continuous land," shortened to just continens, stem continent-.

Most ships of the Archaic Period were not ocean-going. They followed the shores closely, ready to put in at the first sign of trouble. It is not surprising that the first continents were "shores," as they are in Herodotus, first historian whose works are extant, who relies on earlier geography now missing except for fragments. Asia is defined by two akrai, "bluffs" or "shores." One runs from Phasis in Colchis (Georgia) at the eastern end of the Black Sea around the coast of Asia Minor to Phoenicia. The second runs from Phoenicia to the Red Sea (the ancient Red Sea comprised also the Persian Gulf and the Indian Ocean) and from there to India, after which "no man can say what sort of region it is."

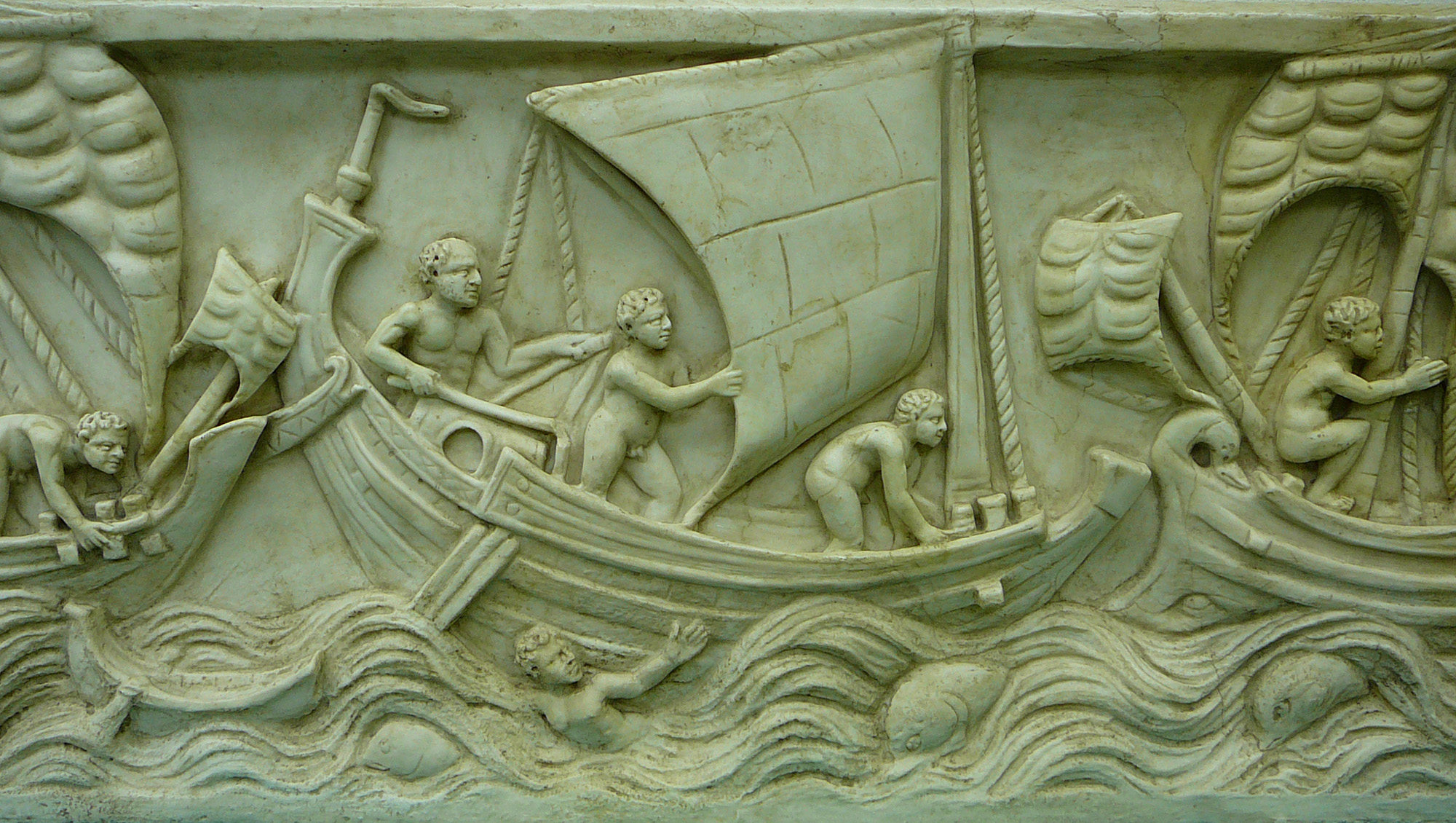
Ancient ships in trouble on the sea

Asia is equal to its shores, which also define Europe and Libya. The northern shore runs eastward along the line if the Phasis and Araxes Rivers; that is, south of the Caucasus Mountains, and around the south of the Caspian Sea. The southern shore continues the Red Sea and the Nile River, as Darius the Great had constructed a canal between them. This division and system was already in place before Herodotus. He professes not to understand it: "I am astonished that men should ever have divided Libya, Asia and Europe as they have, for they are exceedingly unequal." His astonishment continues: "I cannot conceive why three names, and women's names especially, should ever have been given to a tract which is in reality one ... nor can I even say who gives the three tracts [akrai] their names." Previously he had spoken of two tracts. He says that an alternate northern border is the mouth of the Don River.

Strabo, geographer of the Early Roman Empire, has an explanation of the geography Herodotus found so puzzling. The key is the coast-hugging requirement of most ancient navigation. As the ancient navigator passed under the Rock of Gibraltar on his way into the Mediterranean Sea ("our sea" to those who lived there), two paths appeared to him, the north shore or the south shore. Strabo says:

"Now as you sail into the strait at the Pillars, Libya lies on your right hand as far as the stream of the Nile, and on your left hand across the strait lies Europe as far as the Tanais."

To the ancient navigators of Our Sea, the continents were separated by seas. The canal extended the southern shore into the Red Sea. The symmetry of the scheme was too geometric for the Greeks to resist, as they represented all geographic masses by regular figures if they could. A triangle prevailed in the Greek imagination with points at the Pillars, the Tanais and the Red Sea. As the sides were three shores, the continents were three.

==== Imperial Roman geography ====
The geographer, Claudius Ptolemaeus, distinguishes between geography, which is "a representation in picture of the whole known world," and chorography ("study of places"), which "treats more fully the particulars." The idea of the continents is geography and is presented as such. A chorographer in Ptolemy's view was the expert in a specific locality, such as a ship captain, a merchant, or a native. Geographers consult them but they do not write geography unless they happen to be both.

Ptolemy was a geographer of the middle Roman Empire, an Egyptian. The idea of the continents preceded the imperial Romans but through them reached to modern time to determine today's geographic views, which are enhancements and refinements of the classical. Stating that "continents are bounded more properly, when it is possible, by seas than by rivers," Ptolemy defines a three-continent system: Europe, Libya, Asia. His Libya is the North Africa of today, containing a province, Africa, whose name replaced Libya. Rejecting the Nile River as the Asian border so as not to split Egypt, Ptolemy designates the Red Sea as the border between Libya and Asia. In the north, the border between Asia and Europe is a meridian through the mouth of the Don River northward "to the unknown region." Asia Minor remains "Asia properly so called."

Ptolemy's Asia extends to the Far East, approximately identical to today's Asia, except that the European border runs through the future location of Moscow, then a wilderness of forest skirted by Sarmatian tribesmen. In a striking foreshadowing of European and Asian Russia, European Sarmatia lies between the Vistula River and the Don River, while Asiatic Sarmatia runs east of the Don to Scythia.

=== Geologic view ===
The relatively recent study of plate tectonics has discovered that Asia has several regions that would be considered distinct landmasses if strictly geologic and tectonic criteria were used (for example, South Asia and East Asia). Definition of continental plates is the realm of geologists. Strictly in terms of geological landmasses or tectonic plates, Europe is a western peninsula of Eurasia and of the Africa-Eurasia landmass. In the latter, Europe and Asia are parts of the Eurasian Plate, which excludes the Arabian and Indian tectonic plates.

=== Regional view ===
In human geography, there are several schools of thought. The more common school follows historical convention and treats Europe and Asia as different continents, categorizing East Asia, South Asia, and the Middle East as specific regions for more detailed analysis. Other schools equate the word "continent" to geographical "region" when referring to Europe and Asia in terms of physical geography.

=== Ethnic view ===
In European languages, the term "Asian" more commonly refers to ethnic heritage rather than a strict geographic area. In American English, "Asian" often refers to East and Southeast Asians, while in British English, Asian often refers to South Asians. See the List of transcontinental countries for further geographic definitions. The term Asia–Pacific generally refers to a combination of East Asia, Southeast Asia, and islands in the Pacific Ocean – and most are also considered part of Australasia or Oceania. Asia contains the Indian subcontinent, Iranian Plateau, Arabian Peninsula, as well as a piece of the North American plate in Siberia.

== Regions ==
Since the 18th century, Asia has been divided into several regions and subregions. There has been no universal consensus on the use of these terms.

The six regions of Asia include:

Central Asia
Commonly understood as comprising the former Soviet Central Asian countries of Kazakhstan, Kyrgyzstan, Tajikistan, Turkmenistan, and Uzbekistan.
East Asia
Commonly understood as comprising China, Hong Kong (China), Japan, Macau (China), Mongolia, North Korea, South Korea, and Taiwan. Greater China (Mainland China, the two special administrative regions of China, and the Taiwan Area) comprises the bulk of this region. Mainland China can be further subdivided into five smaller subregions: China proper, Inner Mongolia, Northeast China (a.k.a. Manchuria), Tibet, and Xinjiang (a.k.a. Chinese Turkestan or East Turkestan). A common synonym for East Asia is Northeast Asia, although some geographers only include the Japanese archipelago, the Korean Peninsula, the Mongolian Plateau, and the Northeast China Plain, as well as the mountainous regions of the Russian Far East (a part of Siberia) in this region.
North Asia
Commonly understood as comprising Siberia (Russia), which is also a common synonym for North Asia.
South Asia
Commonly understood as comprising Afghanistan, Bangladesh, Bhutan, the British Indian Ocean Territory (United Kingdom), India, Maldives, Nepal, Pakistan, and Sri Lanka. A common approximate synonym for South Asia is the Indian subcontinent which excludes Afghanistan.
Southeast Asia
Commonly understood as comprising the ASEAN countries of Brunei, Cambodia, East Timor, Indonesia, Laos, Malaysia, Myanmar, the Philippines, Singapore, Thailand, and Vietnam. This region can be further subdivided into two smaller subregions: Mainland Southeast Asia (a.k.a. the Indochinese Peninsula) and Maritime Southeast Asia (a.k.a. the Malay Archipelago).
West Asia
Commonly understood as comprising Abkhazia, Akrotiri and Dhekelia (United Kingdom), Armenia, Azerbaijan, Bahrain, Cyprus, Georgia, Iran, Iraq, Israel, Jordan, Kuwait, Lebanon, Northern Cyprus, Oman, Palestine, Qatar, Saudi Arabia, Sinai (Egypt), South Ossetia, Syria, Turkey, the United Arab Emirates, and Yemen. Common synonyms for West Asia are the Middle East, the Near East, and Southwest Asia. The Middle East generally includes Egypt (a transcontinental country between Africa and Asia) but excludes the South Caucasian countries.

== Climate ==
Köppen-Geiger climate classification map for Asia.

The climate of Asia is dry across its southwestern region. Some of the largest daily temperature ranges on Earth occur in the western part of Asia. The monsoon circulation dominates across the southern and eastern regions, due to the Himalayas forcing the formation of a thermal low which draws in moisture during the summer. The southwestern region of the continent experiences low relief as a result of the subtropical high pressure belt; they are hot in summer, warm to cool in winter, and may snow at higher altitudes. Siberia is one of the coldest places in the Northern Hemisphere, and can act as a source of arctic air mass for North America. The most active place on Earth for tropical cyclone activity lies northeast of the Philippines and south of Japan, and the phase of the El Nino-Southern Oscillation modulates where in Asia landfall is more likely to occur. Many parts of Asia are being impacted by climate change.

=== Asia's changing climate ===
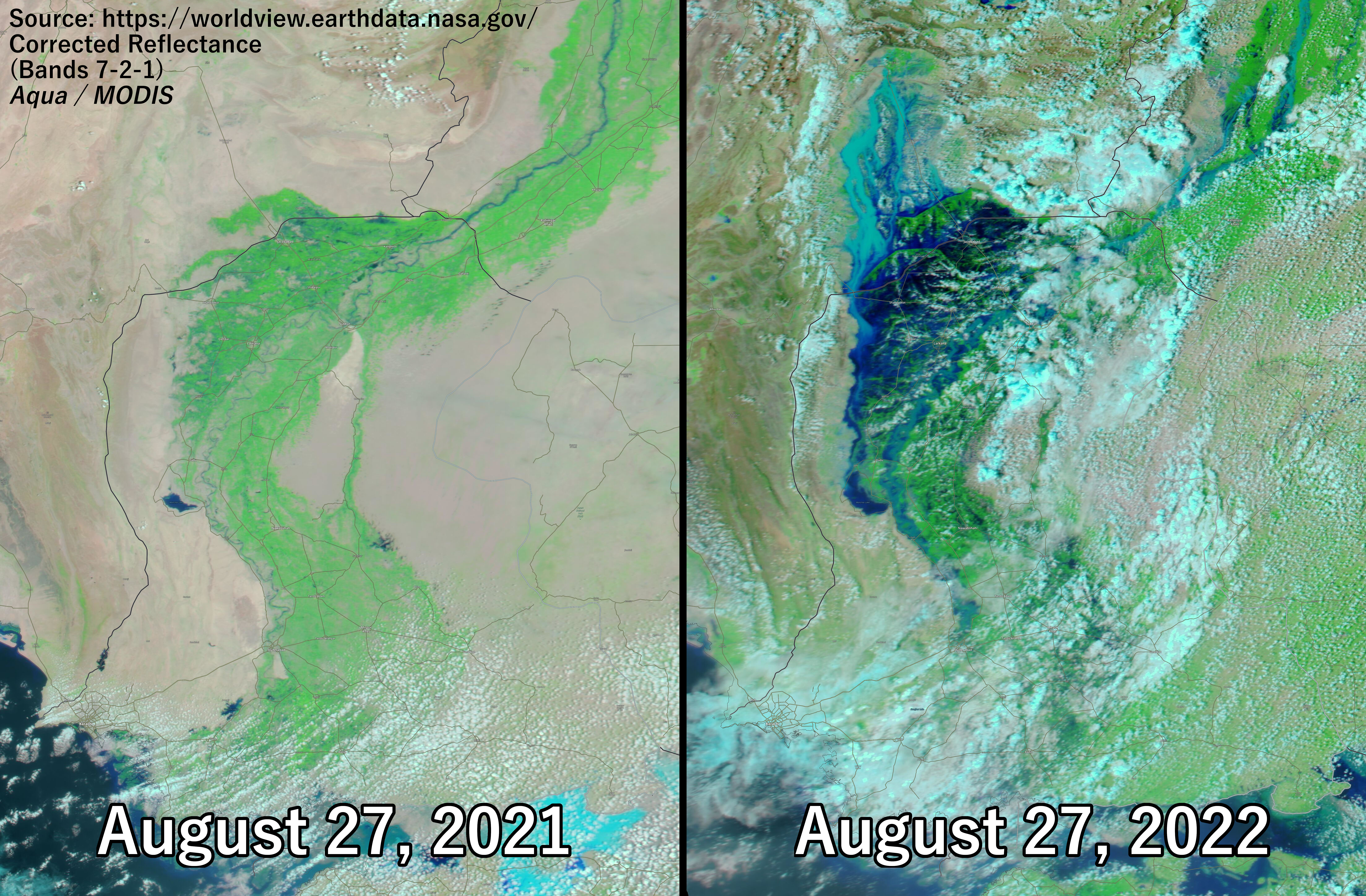
The 2022 South Asian floods, including in Pakistan (pictured), are an example of a climate change impact.

Climate change is particularly important in Asia, as the continent accounts for the majority of the human population. Warming since the 20th century is increasing the threat of heatwaves across the entire continent. Heatwaves lead to increased mortality, and the demand for air conditioning is rapidly accelerating as a result. By 2080, around 1 billion people in the cities of South and Southeast Asia are expected to experience around a month of extreme heat every year. The impacts on the water cycle are more complicated: already arid regions, primarily located in West Asia and Central Asia, will see more droughts, while areas of East, Southeast and South Asia which are already wet due to the monsoons will experience more flooding.

The waters around Asia are subjected to the same impacts as elsewhere, such as increased warming and ocean acidification. There are many coral reefs in the region, and they are highly vulnerable to climate change, to the point that practically all of them will be lost if the warming exceeds 1.5 °C (2.7 °F). Asia's distinctive mangrove ecosystems are also highly vulnerable to sea level rise. Asia also has more countries with large coastal populations than any other continent, which would cause large economic impacts from sea level rise. Water supplies in the Hindu Kush region will become more unstable as its enormous glaciers, known as the "Asian water towers", gradually melt. These changes to the water cycle also affect vector-borne disease distribution, with malaria and dengue fever expected to become more prominent in the tropical and subtropical regions. Food security will become more uneven, and South Asian countries could experience significant impacts from global food price volatility.

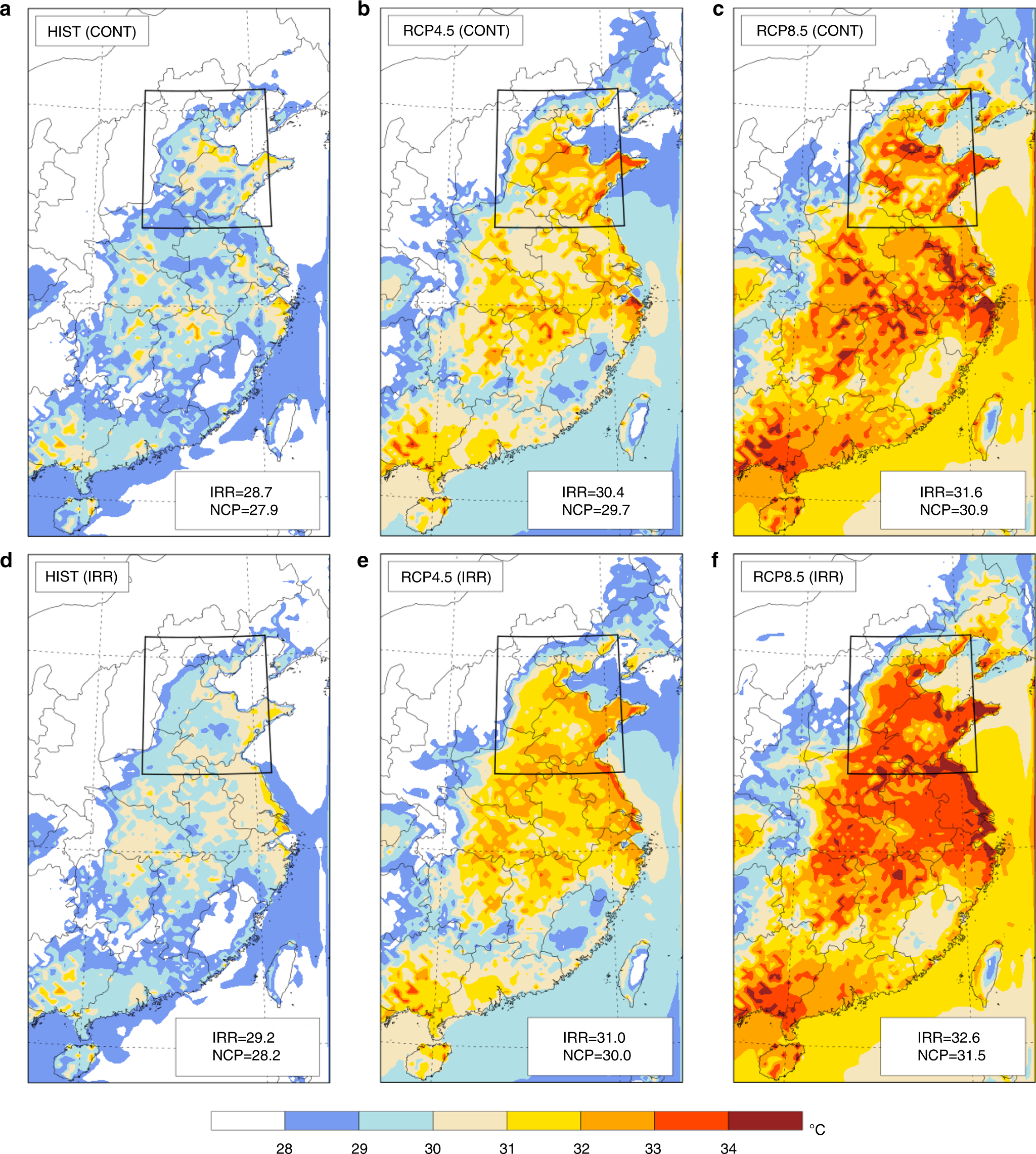
Climate change is expected to exacerbate heat stress over the North China Plain, which is particularly vulnerable as widespread irrigation results in very moist air. There is a risk that agricultural labourers will be physically unable to work outdoors on hot summer days at the end of the century, particularly under the scenario of greatest emissions and warming.

Historical emissions from Asia are lower than those from Europe and North America. However, China has been the single largest emitter of greenhouse gases in the 21st century, while India is the third-largest. As a whole, Asia currently accounts for 36% of the world's primary energy consumption, which is expected to increase to 48% by 2050. By 2040, it is also expected to account for 80% of the world's coal and 26% of the world's natural gas consumption. While the United States remains the world's largest oil consumer, by 2050 it is projected to move to third place, behind China and India. While nearly half of the world's new renewable energy capacity is built in Asia, this is not yet sufficient in order to meet the goals of the Paris Agreement. They imply that the renewables would account for 35% of total energy consumption in Asia by 2030.

Climate change adaptation is already a reality for many Asian countries, with a wide range of strategies attempted across the continent. Important examples include the growing implementation of climate-smart agriculture in certain countries or the "sponge city" planning principles in China. While some countries have drawn up extensive frameworks such as the Bangladesh Delta Plan or Japan's Climate Adaptation Act, others still rely on localized actions that are not effectively scaled up.

== General data for countries defined as Asian by the UNSD ==
The United Nations Statistics Division, charged with collecting statistical data on global regions including Asia, publishes a classification standard, United Nations M49, which assigns code numbers to continental regions, areas and countries, based on statistical purposes, and the countries and regions grouped together don't imply any assumption regarding political or other affiliations between the grouped countries. Some general data on the countries listed in M49 for the continental region, Asia (142), and one non-official region, "Northern Asia," are presented below.

M49 is a device for collecting useful statistics for the UNSD and is a suggested reference guide offered as a global standard for all agencies and institutions within the various UN departments that might be interested. The United Nations Statistics Division does not present it as an authoritative standard or as one that is more valid or more worthy of adoption than some other. It is not a requirement for other agencies within the United Nations, which use their own standards as are convenient for their operations.

No nations have adopted M49 as a mandatory standard. It does, however, reflect general usage concerning the political geography of Asia. M49 is updated frequently to reflect changing geopolitical circumstances.

One problematic aspect of the classification of Asia not yet definitively addressed by the Statistics Division is "Northern Asia," which has no regional code and is not currently officially a region of Asia. Russia, or "the Russian Federation," is a nation of Europe. The "Northern Asia" name is unofficially recognized; for example, the UN Group of Experts on Geographical Names includes an Eastern Europe, Northern and Central Asia Division. "Northern Asia" comes from traditional usage, which divides Europe from Asia at the Ural Mountains. No one at the UN is suggesting that European Russia be included in Asia or that Asian Russia be included in Europe. Their policy is that a nation shall appear once in one region. They have selected Europe. The problem remains unsolved.

=== Geopolitical map of Asia ===
The nations of this map with one major exception (and a few minor ones) are those defined by The World Factbook. Short forms of the names are used; sometimes abbreviations. All the nations can be found in the table below. The one major exception to the scheme is "Russia," not currently officially in the continental region of Asia, but unofficially partly in it even though classified as Europe.

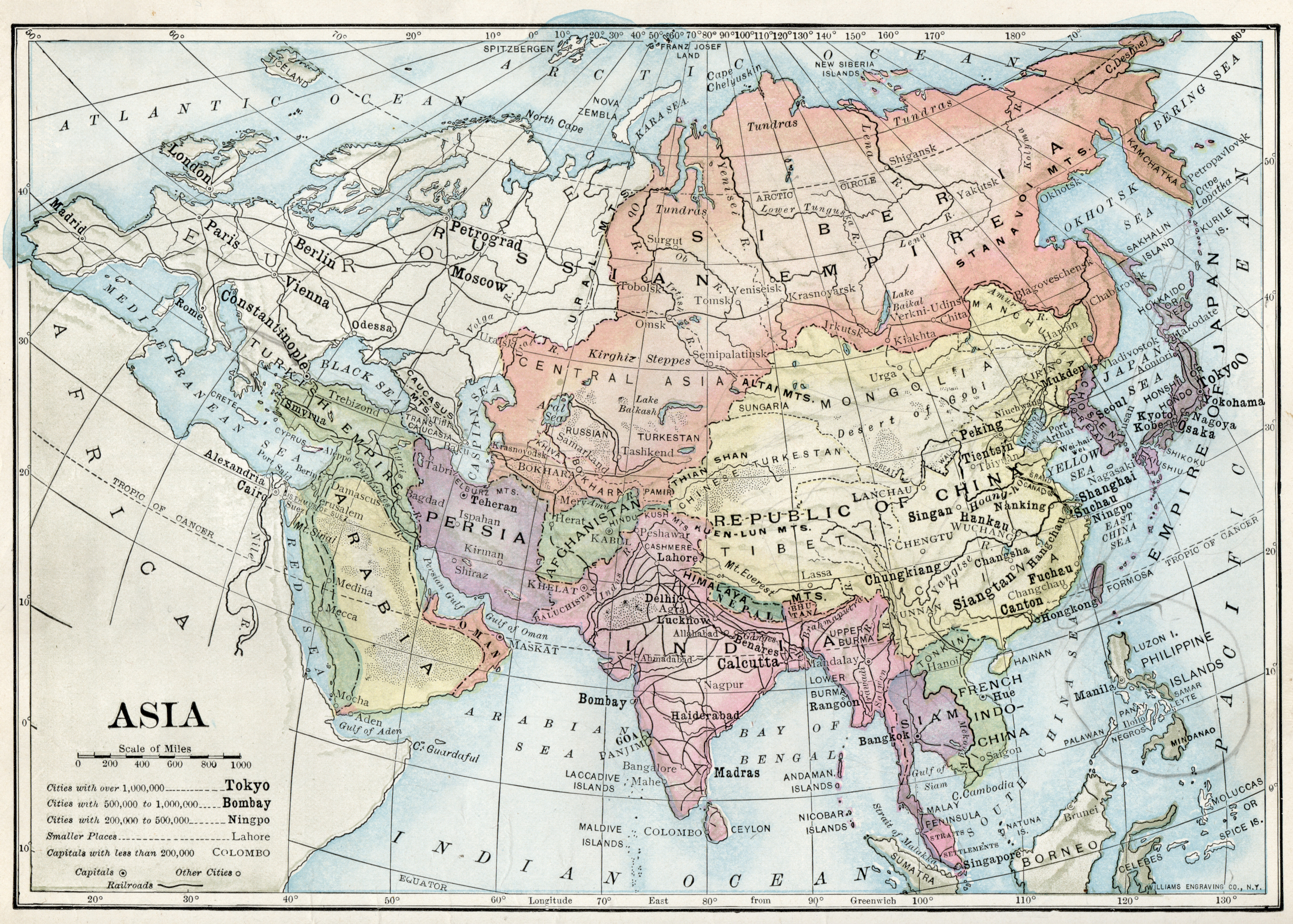
A 1916 political map of Asia by Tarr and McMurry

=== Geopolitical data for Asia ===
==== Introduction ====
The countries in this table are categorised mainly, but not entirely, according to the UNSD scheme for statistical purposes used by the United Nations Statistics Division. For example, the UNSD statistical geoscheme does not recognize a "North Asia," but problematic differences in point of view reach down to the country level elsewhere as well. Part of Egypt (Sinai Peninsula) is geographically in West Asia, and the Australian external territories of Christmas Island and the Cocos (Keeling) Islands are often associated with Asia. However, these are not present in the UNSD geoscheme.

There is no universally defined standard Asia. Traditional views are approximate at best. Even today borders are still being defined, as between Indonesia, Australia and Oceania. As long as conflict over territory remains a human trait there may well be "an eastern question," as the British Empire said of the Ottoman Empire.

In evaluating the geographic position of nations of the edge of Asia some writers utilize the amorphous concept of "transcontinental countries," which has different meanings to different authorities. Merriam-Webster defines it as "going across a continent," as might a railroad. With regard to Asia, there is only one such country, the Russian Federation.

In a second definition, Petrovsky refers to a new tendency to form transcontinental agencies, meaning agencies whose jurisdictions cross continental borders, rather than the whole continent. Petrovsky's examples put together widely scattered sections of continents. There is no question of their trans- status. More precise views, however, require definitions of continents, which in the case of Asia are not quite so facile.

A third definition emphasizes transformation in place from one continent to another. Fahey at first defines Turkey as transcontinental by virtue of being in both Anatolia and the Balkans, neglecting the historical circumstance that the Balkans as part of the Ottoman Empire were once Asian, as was much of North Africa. He then hypothesizes that Turkey, accepted into the European Union, is defined by that circumstance to be European. By this usage, the very region to which "Asia" was first applied is now Europe. If it is, Turkey cannot be transcontinental by being split between two continents. This sort of paradox only underlines that Asia has no precise definition in the same way that nations do, to whom a mere 100 yards of border may be of great concern.

Data included in the table below are per sources in linked articles when available, the CIA World Factbook when not. No attempt is made to split populations. That of Russia is for the whole country; thus, the populations and areas cannot be summed to produce those of any defined Asia. The notes state which nations might be considered transcontinental by some agency, but there is little agreement generally.

==== Table ====
Code	Name of region and territory, with flag	Area (km^{2})	Population	Pop. density (/km^{2})	Date	Capital
143	Central Asia					
398	Kazakhstan	2,724,927	16,536,000	6.1	Jan 2011	Astana
417	Kyrgyzstan	199,951	5,587,443	27.9	Jul 2011	Bishkek
762	Tajikistan	143,100	7,627,200	53.3	Jul 2011	Dushanbe
795	Turkmenistan	488,100	4,997,503	10.2	Jul 2011	Ashgabat
860	Uzbekistan	447,400	28,128,600	62.9	Jul 2011	Tashkent
030	Eastern Asia					
156	China	9,640,821	1,322,044,605	134.0		Beijing
344	Hong Kong	1,104	7,122,508	6,451.5	Jul 2011	—
392	Japan	377,947	127,920,000	338.5	Jul 2011	Tokyo
408	North Korea	120,540	23,479,095	184.4		Pyongyang
410	South Korea	98,480	49,232,844	490.7		Seoul
446	Macau	25	460,823	18,473.3		—
496	Mongolia	1,565,000	2,996,082	1.7		Ulaanbaatar
158	Taiwan	35,980	22,920,946	626.7		Taipei
N/A	Northern Asia					
643	Russia	13,119,600	37,630,081	2.9		Moscow
035	Southeastern Asia					
096	Brunei	5,770	381,371	66.1		Bandar Seri Begawan
104	Myanmar	676,578	68,758,224	70.3	Jul 2022	Naypyidaw
116	Cambodia	181,035	13,388,910	74		Phnom Penh
360	Indonesia	1,919,440	230,512,000	120.1		Jakarta
418	Laos	236,800	6,677,534	28.2		Vientiane
458	Malaysia	329,847	27,780,000	84.2		Kuala Lumpur
608	Philippines	343,448	92,681,453	308.9		Manila
702	Singapore	704	4,608,167	6,545.7		Singapore
764	Thailand	514,000	65,493,298	127.4		Bangkok
626	Timor-Leste	15,007	1,108,777	73.8		Dili
704	Vietnam	331,690	86,116,559	259.6		Hanoi
034	Southern Asia					
004	Afghanistan	647,500	32,738,775	42.9		Kabul
050	Bangladesh	147,570	153,546,901	1040.5		Dhaka
064	Bhutan	38,394	682,321	17.8		Thimphu
356	India	3,287,263	1,147,995,226	349.2		New Delhi
462	Maldives	300	379,174	1,263.3		Malé
524	Nepal	147,181	29,519,114	200.5		Kathmandu
586	Pakistan	881,913	207,774,520	244.4		Islamabad
144	Sri Lanka	65,610	21,128,773	322.0		Sri Jayawardenapura-Kotte
145	West Asia					
051	Armenia	29,800	3,299,000	280.7		Yerevan
031	Azerbaijan	86,660	8,845,127	102.736		Baku
048	Bahrain	665	718,306	987.1		Manama
196	Cyprus	9,250	792,604	83.9		Nicosia
818	Egypt	60,000	600,000	10		Cairo
268	Georgia	69,700	4,636,400	65.1		Tbilisi
364	Iran	1,648,195	70,472,846	42.8		Tehran
368	Iraq	437,072	28,221,181	54.9		Baghdad
376	Israel	20,770	7,112,359	290.3		Jerusalem
400	Jordan	92,300	6,198,677	57.5		Amman
414	Kuwait	17,820	2,596,561	118.5		Kuwait City
422	Lebanon	10,452	3,971,941	353.6		Beirut
512	Oman	212,460	3,311,640	12.8		Muscat
275	State of Palestine	6,257	4,277,000	683.5		Ramallah
634	Qatar	11,437	928,635	69.4		Doha
682	Saudi Arabia	1,960,582	23,513,330	12.0		Riyadh
760	Syria	185,180	19,747,586	92.6		Damascus
792	Turkey	783,356	84,680,273	110		Ankara
784	United Arab Emirates	82,880	4,621,399	29.5		Abu Dhabi
887	Yemen	527,970	23,013,376	35.4		Sanaá
142	Asia	43,810,582	4,162,966,086	89.07		—

==== Table notes ====
a: Azerbaijan, Georgia, and Turkey are often considered to be transcontinental countries, spanning both Asia and Europe. Many organisations, such as the BBC place them in Europe, while others such as the CIA include them in Asia, West Asia and the Middle East to be precise. All are included in European organisations such as the Council of Europe and are considered to be European, and thus eligible to join, by the European Union.
b: Azerbaijan, Kazakhstan, and Turkey are considered split by some between two continents: Azerbaijan north of the Caucasus, Kazakhstan west of the Ural River and Turkey west of the Bosphorus might be construed as in Europe. Only national data is presented. Splitting a nation would be more problematic; for example, the Ural River is not a well-defined boundary in places; moreover, some geopolitical units straddle it. The UN convention is followed here, which does not define any transcontinental regions.
c: Indonesia is often considered a transcontinental country with territory in both Asia and Oceania, and East Timor can be placed in either Asia or Oceania. Population and area figures for Indonesia do not include Irian Jaya and Maluku Islands, frequently reckoned in Oceania.
d: Russia is considered a transcontinental country with territory in Eastern Europe and Northern Asia; population and area figures are for the Ural Federal District, Siberian Federal District and Far Eastern Federal District of Russia, which belong to Asia.
e: The island of Cyprus is located on the Asian Anatolian Plate, but is a member of European organisations such as the Council of Europe and the European Union. Armenia is similarly located fully within Asia, but is a member of the Council of Europe.
f: Egypt is often considered a transcontinental country with territory in North Africa and West Asia; population and area figures are for the Sinai Peninsula, which belongs to Asia.
g: Hong Kong and Macau are Special Administrative Regions (SAR) of China. Taiwan (officially the Republic of China) is a de facto state claimed by the PRC. Figures given for China do not include these areas.
h: The area of India includes Jammu and Kashmir, a disputed territory contested between India, Pakistan, and China.
i: In 1980, Jerusalem was proclaimed Israel's united capital, following its annexation of Arab-dominant East Jerusalem during the 1967 Six-Day War. The United Nations and many countries do not recognize this claim, with most countries maintaining embassies in Tel Aviv instead.
j: Afghanistan is also considered to be a Central Asian country. It only joined the South Asian Association for Regional Cooperation in 2007.

== Regional maps of Asia ==
Regional maps of Asia

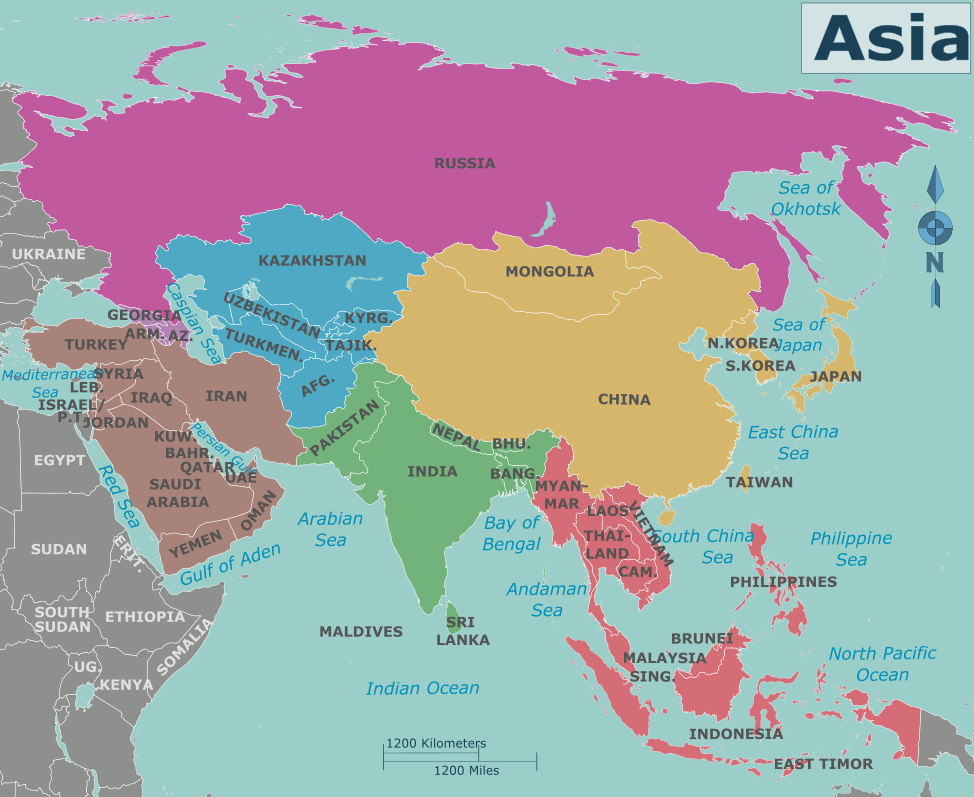
Map of Asia

Map of the Caucasus

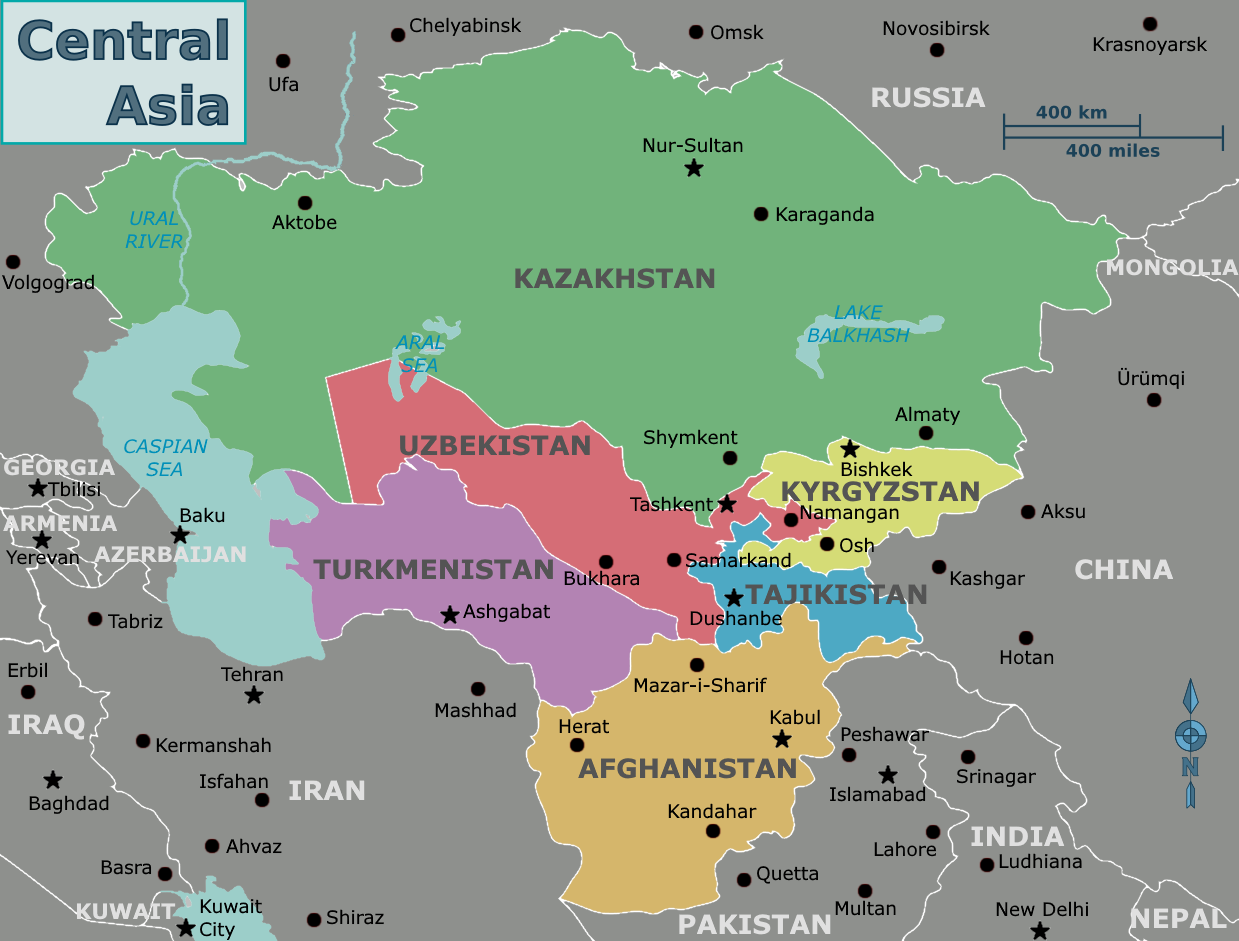
Map of Central Asia

Map of North Asia (excluding the Urals)

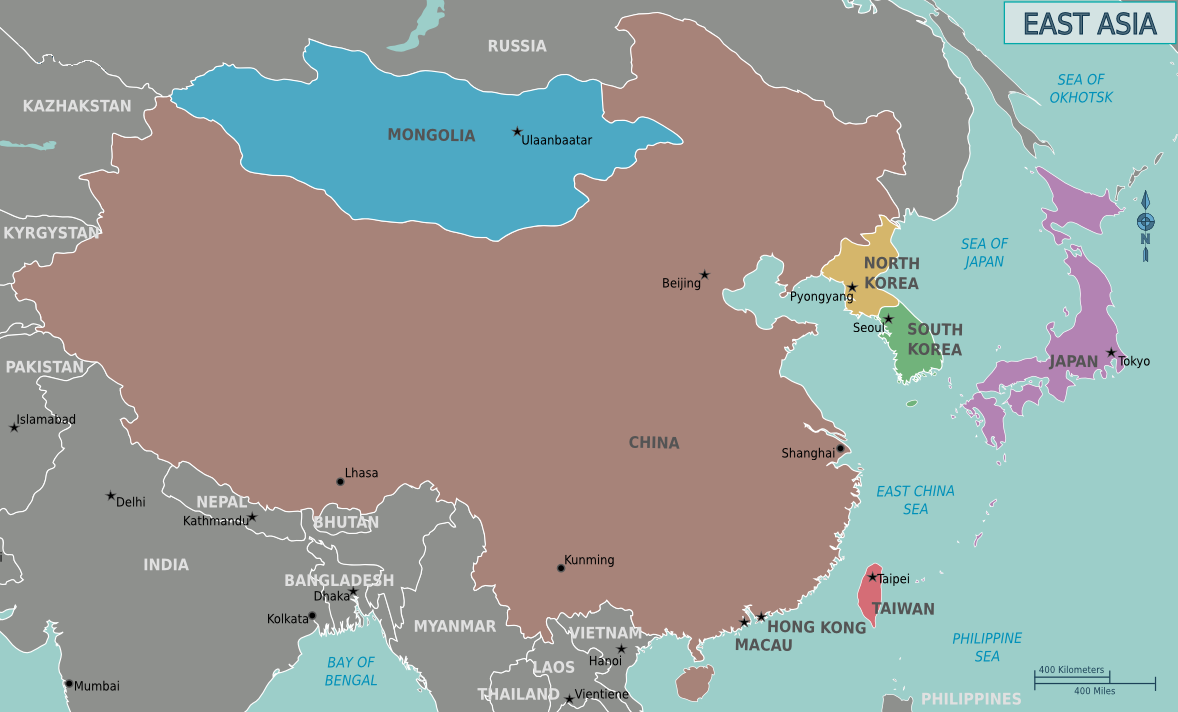
Map of East Asia

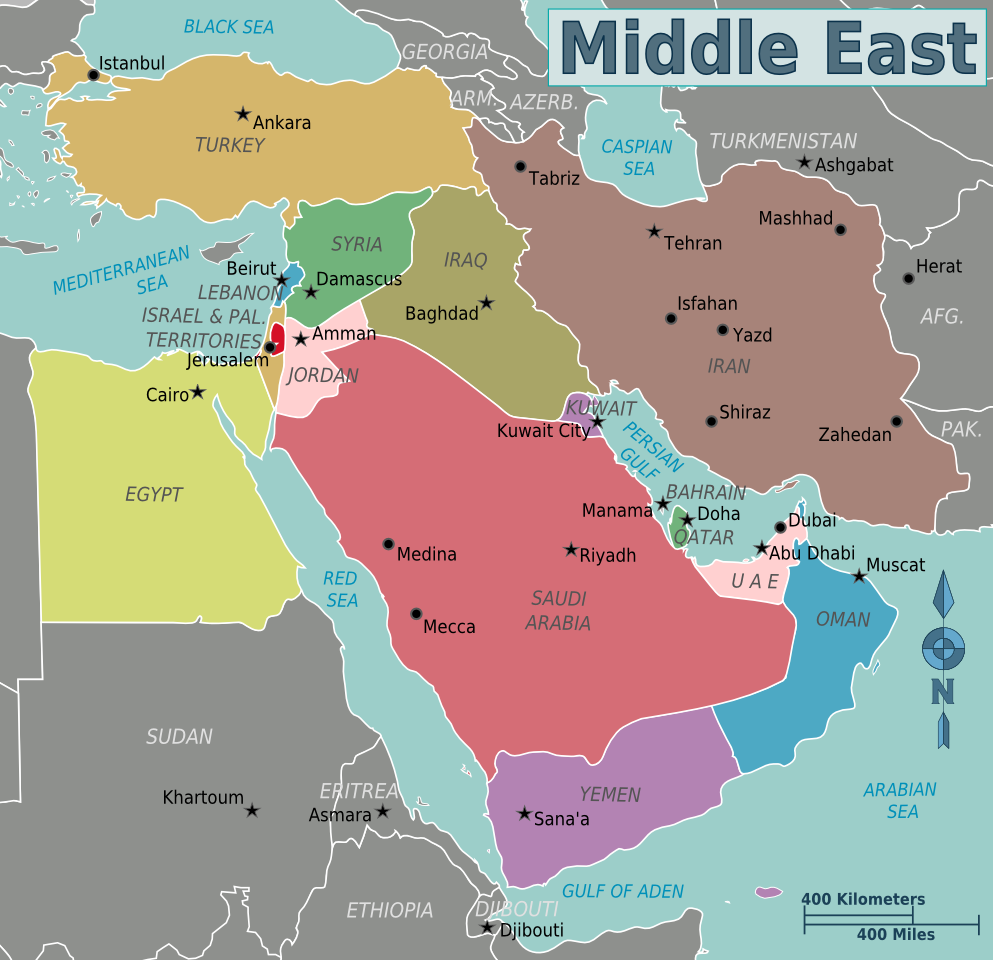
Map of the Middle East

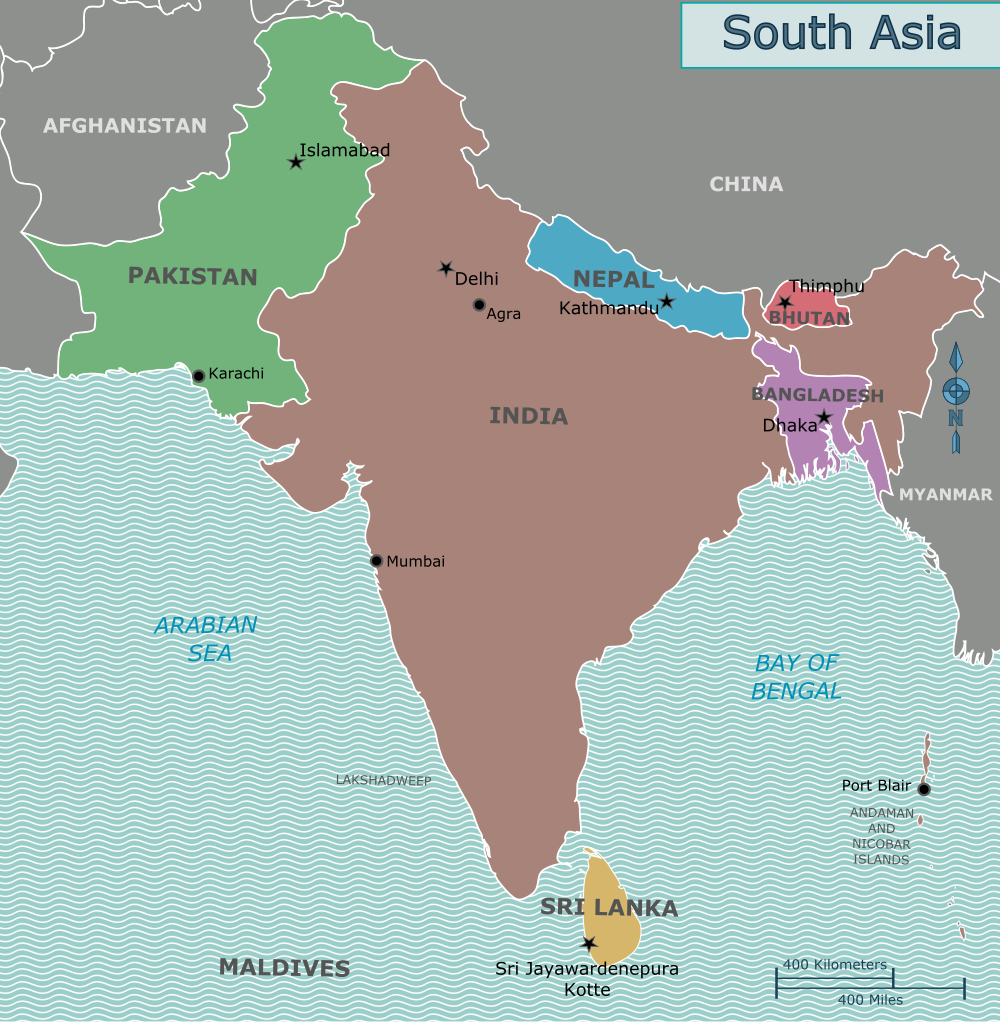
Map of South Asia

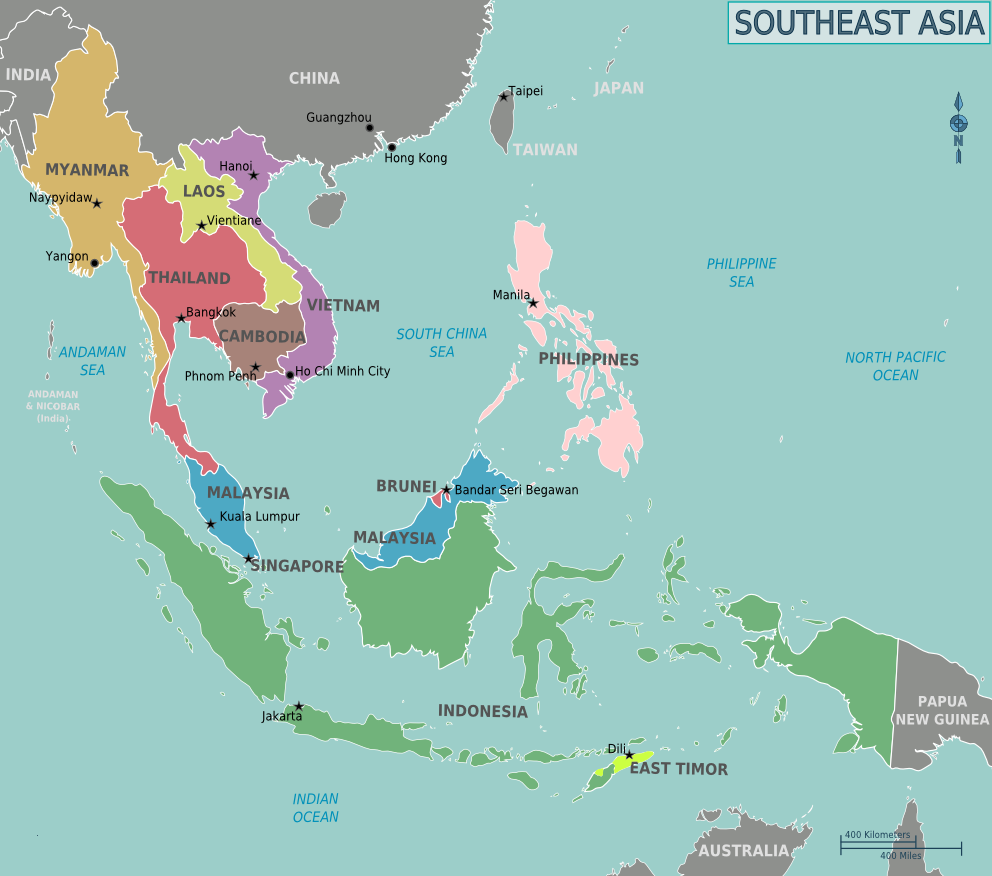
Map of Southeast Asia

== See also ==
- List of Asian countries by population
- United Nations geoscheme for Asia
- Indo-Pacific
- Asia-Pacific
- Pacific Rim
